= New York State Route 105 =

Highway on Long Island, New York

New York State Route 105
- Jerusalem Avenue
- Map of Nassau County on Long Island with NY 105 highlighted in red

Route information
- Maintained by NYSDOT
- Length: 3.41 mi (5.49 km)
- Existed: c. 1932–present

Major junctions
- West end: NY 106 in North Bellmore
- NY 135 in North Wantagh
- East end: NY 107 at the Massapequa–North Massapequa line

Location
- Country: United States
- State: New York
- Counties: Nassau

Highway system
- New York Highways; Interstate; US; State; Reference; Parkways
← NY 104B	→ NY 106

New York State Route 105 (NY 105) is a 3.41-mile (5.49 km) state highway located within Nassau County, New York, in the United States. It begins in the town of Hempstead at an intersection with NY 106 in North Bellmore that also serves as that route's southern terminus. From here, it runs east through North Wantagh to an interchange with NY 135 and through northern Seaford, before crossing into the town of Oyster Bay and ending at a junction with NY 107 in Massapequa. Jerusalem Avenue continues west past the route's western terminus as a county-maintained road to Hempstead and east as a town road to Massapequa Preserve. NY 105 was assigned in the early 1930s.

== Route description ==
=== West of NY 106 (CR 105) ===
CR 105 begins at an intersection with Greenwich Street (CR 7B) in Hempstead and runs as a two lane road parallel to Hempstead Turnpike and the Southern State Parkway. It curves southeast after Henry Street (CR 55) and heads into Uniondale. The road continues southwest through southern Uniondale, passing Saint Martha's Church and Turtle Hook Middle School, intersecting with Uniondale Avenue (CR 188).

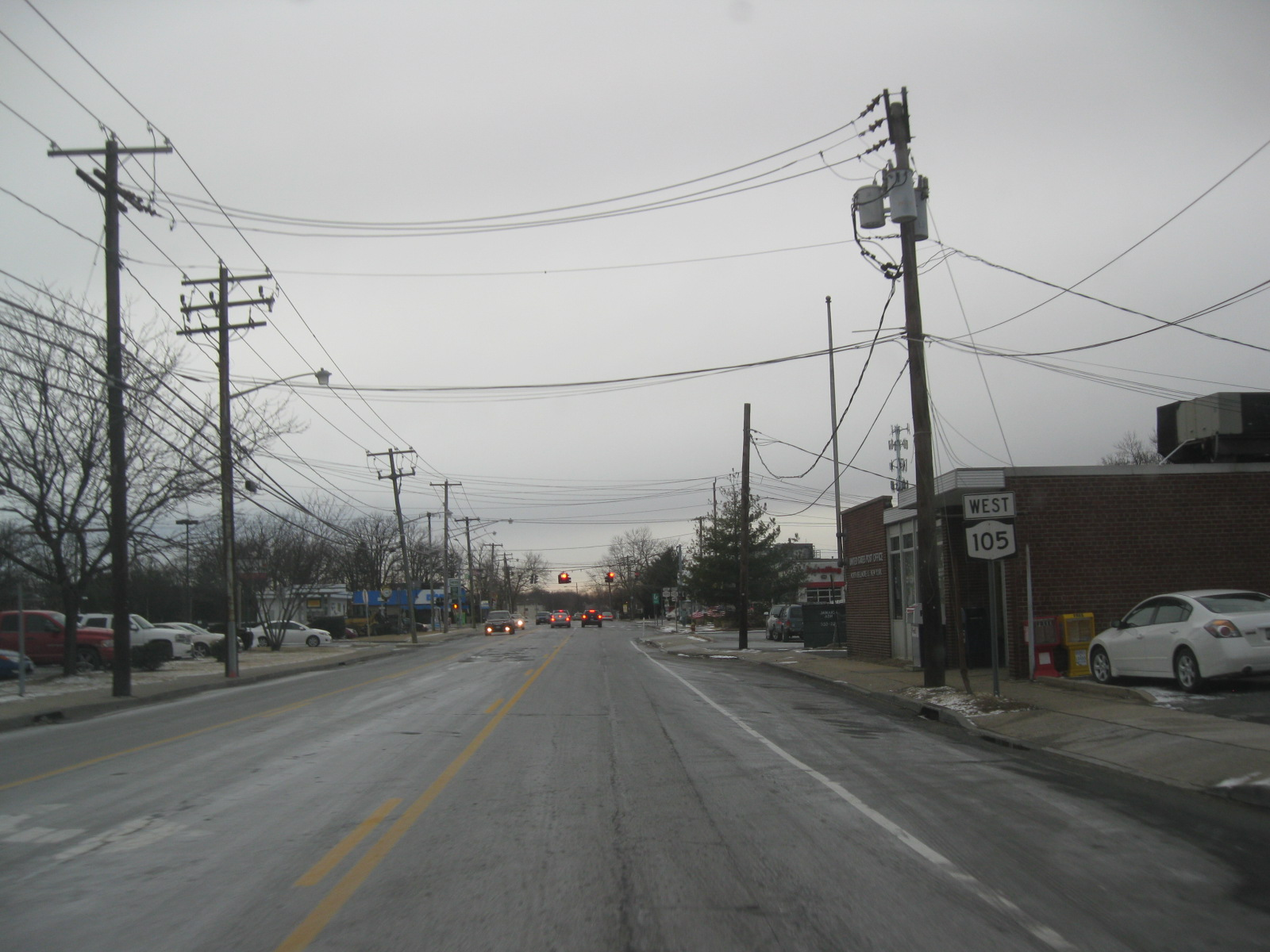
NY 105 westbound approaching the western terminus at NY 106 in North Bellmore

Jerusalem Avenue crosses the Meadowbrook State Parkway but doesn't connect to the highway. After the overpass, it enters North Merrick It intersects with North Jerusalem Road (CR 181), which travels into East Meadow. Jerusalem Avenue runs through a suburban part of the hamlet and intersects with Meadowbrook ROad and Merrick Avenue. At the intersection, the road curves northward to run straight west before crossing the Southern State Parkway and reaching Bellmore Avenue (CR 26). The road enters North Bellmore and intersects with Newbridge Road.

=== NY 105 ===
NY 105 begins at an intersection with NY 106 (Newbridge Road) and Jerusalem Avenue in the North Bellmore section of the town of Hempstead. NY 105 proceeds east along the two-lane Jerusalem Avenue as it travels through a commercial section of North Bellmore. After 1 mile (1.6 km), the road widens slightly to include a center turn lane. Not far to the east, NY 105 crosses over the Wantagh State Parkway without connecting to the highway.

On the opposite side of the parkway overpass, NY 105 crosses into North Wantagh and an area known as Downtown Wantagh, where the route intersects with Wantagh Avenue (unsigned CR 189), formerly designated as NY 115. After Wantagh Avenue, NY 105 crosses through a residential section of North Wantagh named Wantagh Woods, where it bends southeast and briefly gains a frontage road on the eastbound side. After a half-mile (0.8 km), NY 105 curves back to the east at an interchange with the Seaford–Oyster Bay Expressway (NY 135).

Past NY 135, NY 105 leaves North Wantagh and enters Seaford, and heads past Washington Avenue County Park before crossing into the adjacent town of Oyster Bay. Within Oyster Bay, the road runs across the northern edge of Massapequa before meeting NY 107 in a commercial district located a short distance from the town line. The NY 105 ends here; however, Jerusalem Avenue continues east past NY 107 toward Massapequa Preserve as a town-maintained highway.

== History ==
The highway now designated NY 105 was improved to state highway standards as part of a project contracted out by the state of New York on September 20, 1907. A total of 7.09 miles (11.41 km) of highway were rebuilt as part of the $81,000 project (equivalent to $2.9 million in 2025), including the state-maintained section of modern NY 102. The reconstructed roads were added to the state highway system on November 2, 1908, as unsigned State Highway 437 (SH 437). Both parts of SH 437 received posted route numbers in the early 1930s, with the Jerusalem Avenue segment becoming part of NY 105 c. 1932. NY 105's alignment has not been altered since.

== Major intersections ==
The entire route is in Nassau County.

Location	mi	km	Destinations	Notes
Hempstead Village	0.00	0.00	Greenwich Street (CR 7B)	
Hempstead Village	0.10	0.16	Henry Street (CR 55)	
Uniondale	1.30	2.09	Uniondale Avenue (CR 188)	
East Meadow–North Merrick line	2.40	3.86	North Jerusalem Road (CR 181)	
North Merrick	3.00	4.83	Merrick Avenue (CR 4)	
North Merrick–North Bellmore line	3.80	6.12	Bellmore Avenue (CR 26)	
North Bellmore	4.16 0.00	6.69 0.00	NY 106 north (Newbridge Road)	Route transition between CR 105 and NY 105; western terminus of NY 105 southern terminus of NY 106
North Wantagh	1.83	2.95	Wantagh Avenue (CR 189)	
North Wantagh	2.53	4.07	To NY 135 south NY 135 north	Access to NY 135 south via Express Way; exit 3 on NY 135
Massapequa–North Massapequa line	3.41	5.49	NY 107 (Hicksville Road)	Eastern terminus
1.000 mi = 1.609 km; 1.000 km = 0.621 mi
