= Cedar Creek Park =

Park in Nassau County, New York, United States

- Interactive map of Cedar Creek Park
- Type: Public
- Location: Seaford, New York
- Coordinates: 40°39′31″N 73°30′24″W
- Area: 259 acres (105 ha)
- Established: 1975
- Owner: County of Nassau
- Operator: Nassau County Department of Parks, Recreation and Museums
- Website: www.nassaucountyny.gov/2792/Cedar-Creek-Park

Cedar Creek Park is a public park located within Seaford, in Nassau County, New York, United States. It is owned and maintained by Nassau County.

== Description ==
Cedar Creek Park is located at the south end of Seaford on Merrick Road, east of Wantagh Avenue. It occupies 259 acres (105 ha) of land and contains playgrounds, dunes, and athletic fields, and offers a variety of community-based activities.

The park also includes over 1.5 miles (2.4 km) of walking paths, as well as a model aerodrome. Furthermore, Cedar Creek Park serves as the northern terminus of the Jones Beach Bikeway.

The Cedar Creek Wastewater Treatment Plant is directly to the south, and is accessed via a gate inside the park.

== History ==
The land now consisting of Cedar Creek Park was acquired by Nassau County in 1975. It established Cedar Creek County Park that same year.

During several months following Hurricane Sandy in October 2012, Cedar Creek Park was the site of a relief and assistance center, providing services of the American Red Cross and the Federal Emergency Management Agency, and a central location for property insurance companies to advise customers regarding the filing of claims for property damage.

== See also ==
- Bay Park (Bay Park, New York)
- Wantagh Park
