= Wantagh Avenue =

Road on Long Island, New York

- Nassau County Route 189

Route information
- Maintained by NCDPW and ToH DPW
- Length: 5.73 mi (9.22 km)

Major junctions
- South end: Wantagh Park in Wantagh
- Wantagh State Parkway in Wantagh; Merrick Road (CR 27) in Wantagh; NY 27 in Wantagh; NY 105 in North Wantagh; Southern State Parkway in North Wantagh; NY 24 in Levittown
- North end: NY 107 in Levittown

Location
- Country: United States
- State: New York
- County: Nassau

Highway system
- County routes in New York; County Routes in Nassau County

Wantagh Avenue is a major, 5.73-mile (9.22 km) road in Nassau County, on Long Island, New York, between Wantagh and Levittown. Currently owned and maintained by the Nassau County Department of Public Works for most of its length as the unsigned Nassau County Route 189, the road was formerly owned and maintained by the New York State Department of Public Works (and later by NYSDOT) as New York State Route 115 from c. 1932 until July 1, 1972.

A small, disconnected segment of Wantagh Avenue also exists south of the Wantagh Parkway as a Town of Hempstead-maintained residential street.

== Route description ==
Wantagh Avenue is split into two segments. The main, 5.25-mile (8.45 km) segment extends from Merrick Road (CR 27) in Wantagh to Hicksville Road (NY 107) in Levittown. The other segment consists of the remaining 0.48 miles (0.77 km) between Wantagh Park and a dead-end just south of the Wantagh State Parkway; the two segments are separated by the Wantagh State Parkway. The two sections were connected until the Wantagh State Parkway was constructed through the area.

=== Southern segment ===
Wantagh Avenue begins as a residential street owned and maintained by the Town of Hempstead at the entrance to Wantagh Park in Wantagh. It then heads north for 0.48 miles (0.77 km), continuing straight for three blocks, passing St. Regis Street before reaching a dead-end next to the Wantagh State Parkway.

=== Main segment (CR 189) ===
Immediately on the other side of the Wantagh State Parkway, Wantagh Avenue resumes at a signalized intersection with Merrick Road (CR 27); this location marks the start of Nassau County's ownership and the CR 189 designation – and the southern end of the main, 5.25-mile (8.45 km) segment of the road. From there, it heads north, soon intersecting Sunrise Highway (NY 27) and passing underneath the Wantagh station on the Long Island Rail Road's Babylon Branch immediately thereafter. CR 189 then continues northwards, and it eventually passes Wantagh Senior High School before reaching Jerusalem Avenue (NY 105) at the Wantagh–North Wantagh line. It then continues north-northeast through North Wantagh and shortly thereafter reaches a cloverleaf interchange with the Southern State Parkway; Wantagh Avenue crosses over the parkway and immediately thereafter reaches an intersection with North Jerusalem Road (CR 181) adjacent to MacArthur High School, entering Levittown and veering northeast.

From its intersection with CR 181, Wantagh Avenue continues northwards through Levittown as a divided surface arterial, winding its way north-northeast as such until its intersection with Cotton Lane & Miller Place, at which point it once again becomes undivided. Wantagh Avenue then continues north, soon thereafter reaching its intersection Hempstead Turnpike (NY 24). From there, it continues north, flanked with service roads on either side as far north as Universe Drive, soon thereafter reaching its northern terminus with Hicksville Road (NY 107).

== History ==
Between c. 1932 and July 1, 1972, Wantagh Avenue between Merrick Road and NY 107 was owned and maintained by the New York State Department of Public Works (which merged into the New York State Department of Transportation in 1967) and signed as New York State Route 115. Ownership of that segment was transferred to Nassau County on July 1, 1972, at which time the highway was decommissioned by New York State as New York State Route 115 and re-commissioned by Nassau County as Nassau County Route 189.

Like all other county routes in Nassau County, County Route 189 became unsigned in the 1970s, when Nassau County officials opted to remove the signs as opposed to allocating the funds for replacing them with new ones that met the latest federal design standards and requirements, as per the federal government's Manual on Uniform Traffic Control Devices.

== Major intersections ==
The entire road is located within the Town of Hempstead, in Nassau County.

Location	mi	km	Destinations	Notes
Wantagh	0.00	0.00	Canal Place	Southern terminus of southern segment; pedestrian access to Wantagh Park
Wantagh	0.48	0.77	Dead-end	Northern terminus of southern segment and Town ownership of Wantagh Avenue
Wantagh	Gap in roadway; access to northern segment via St. Regis Street, Woodland Avenue, and Merrick Road (CR 27)			
Wantagh	0.00	0.00	Merrick Road (CR 27)	Southern terminus of northern segment, the CR 189 designation, and County ownership
Wantagh	0.49	0.79	NY 27 (Sunrise Highway) – New York, Montauk	At-grade intersection
Wantagh	0.49	0.79	Railroad Avenue	Access to Wantagh LIRR station
Wantagh	0.63	1.01	Park Avenue	
Wantagh	1.36	2.19	Island Road	
Wantagh–North Wantagh line	2.02	3.25	NY 105 (Jerusalem Avenue) – North Bellmore, Massapequa	At-grade intersection
North Wantagh–Levittown line	2.39	3.85	Southern State Parkway – New York, East Islip	Cloverleaf interchange; Exit 28N–S on the Southern State Parkway
North Wantagh–Levittown line	2.64	4.25	North Jerusalem Road (CR 181)	Access to MacArthur High School via CR 181
Levittown	3.75	6.04	Miller Place and Cotton Lane	
Levittown	4.15	6.68	Crag Lane	Access to Island Trees Middle–High School Campus
Levittown	4.33	6.97	NY 24 (Hempstead Turnpike) – New York, East Farmingdale	At-grade intersection
Levittown	5.25	8.45	NY 107 (Hicksville Road) – Glen Cove, Massapequa	Northern terminus
1.000 mi = 1.609 km; 1.000 km = 0.621 mi

== See also ==
- List of county routes in Nassau County, New York
- List of former state routes in New York (101–200)
- New York State Route 115 – The article on the current NY 115
