= New York State Route 135 =

Highway on Long Island, New York

New York State Route 135
- Seaford–Oyster Bay Expressway; Ralph J. Marino Expressway
- NY 135 highlighted in red

Route information
- Maintained by NYSDOT
- Length: 10.78 mi (17.35 km)
- Existed: by 1964–present
- History: Completed in 1969

Major junctions
- South end: Merrick Road in Seaford
- NY 27 in Seaford; NY 105 on the Seaford-Wantagh line; Southern State Parkway in Wantagh; NY 107 in North Massapequa; NY 24 in Plainedge; Northern State Parkway in Plainview; I-495 in Syosset
- North end: NY 25 in Syosset

Location
- Country: United States
- State: New York
- Counties: Nassau

Highway system
- New York Highways; Interstate; US; State; Reference; Parkways
← NY 134	→ NY 136

New York State Route 135 (NY 135) is a 10.8-mile (17.4 km) freeway in eastern Nassau County, New York, in the United States. The route connects Seaford with Syosset. The highway runs from Merrick Road (unsigned County Route 27 or CR 27) in Seaford to NY 25 in Syosset. In between, NY 135 passes through Bethpage and Plainview and serves Bethpage State Park. The highway is ceremoniously designated as the Ralph J. Marino Expressway; however, it is more commonly known as the Seaford–Oyster Bay Expressway.

The origins of the expressway date back to 1954 when engineering pioneer Robert Moses proposed that a highway be built between Wantagh and Oyster Bay. Although communities along the proposed path of the highway opposed its construction, Moses eventually won the grant. Right-of-way was taken in 1958, and construction began in 1959. In 1967, the name of the expressway was renamed from the Wantagh–Oyster Bay Expressway to its current name. The expressway was completed to its current length in 1969; however, a stub exists at each end of the highway. The freeway was designated as NY 135 by 1964.

Around 1970, Robert Moses returned his focus to the expressway, proposing that the highway be extended north from Syosset. This extension would include a long bridge to Rye in Westchester County across the Long Island Sound. The plan received support until it was brought to the federal government, at which point towns began opposing his plans. Governor Nelson Rockefeller cancelled the proposed extension in 1973. In 2007, a developer proposed building a 16-mile (26 km) tunnel to Rye instead. There have also been plans for a southern extension to Jones Beach, but none have been acted on yet.

== Route description ==
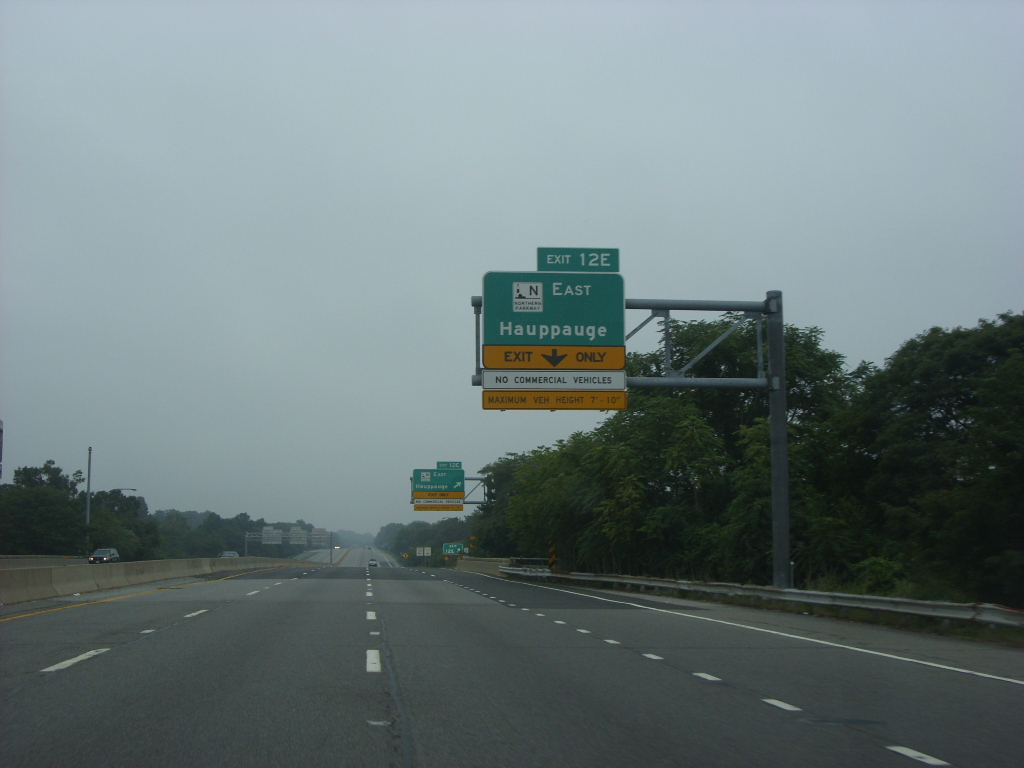
NY 135 at the junction with the Northern State Parkway in Plainview

The Seaford–Oyster Bay Expressway northbound lanes begins at the on-ramp from Merrick Road (unsigned CR 27) near the outer limits of downtown Seaford in southeastern Nassau County. There is an aging sign at the southern terminus, depicting the highway as "NY 135" and showing the nearest control city as Oyster Bay. The off-ramp begins at a commercial building and turns to the northeast, heading through some trees. After a short distance, the on-ramp merges into the northbound lanes of the expressway.

The expressway progresses northward from the on-ramp, crossing over Waverly Avenue and passing the first guide sign for exit 2 (NY 27), about 0.5 miles (0.8 km) ahead from this point. The highway widens to three lanes in each direction as it comes upon the interchange with NY 27. The highway progresses its way northward through the interchange and passes by the first NY 135 northbound shield in the middle of the exit. Trees mainly separate the expressway from the nearby highways and communities. After a short distance, the on-ramp from NY 27 merges into the northbound lanes, and the highway continues northward.

On the southbound side, across from the on-ramp, the southbound lanes split for exit 2E, set specifically for the eastbound alignment of NY 27. Shortly afterward the expressway crosses under both directions of NY 27 on separate bridges. After that, Seamans Neck Road becomes the service road to the expressway, running parallel to the east. There is a bridge over Clark Street in the nearby community of Massapequa, where West Seamans Neck Road, the southbound service road, ends. After a short distance, Seamans Neck Road (CR 191) passes exit 3 for NY 105 and continues west of the expressway going north to Plainedge.

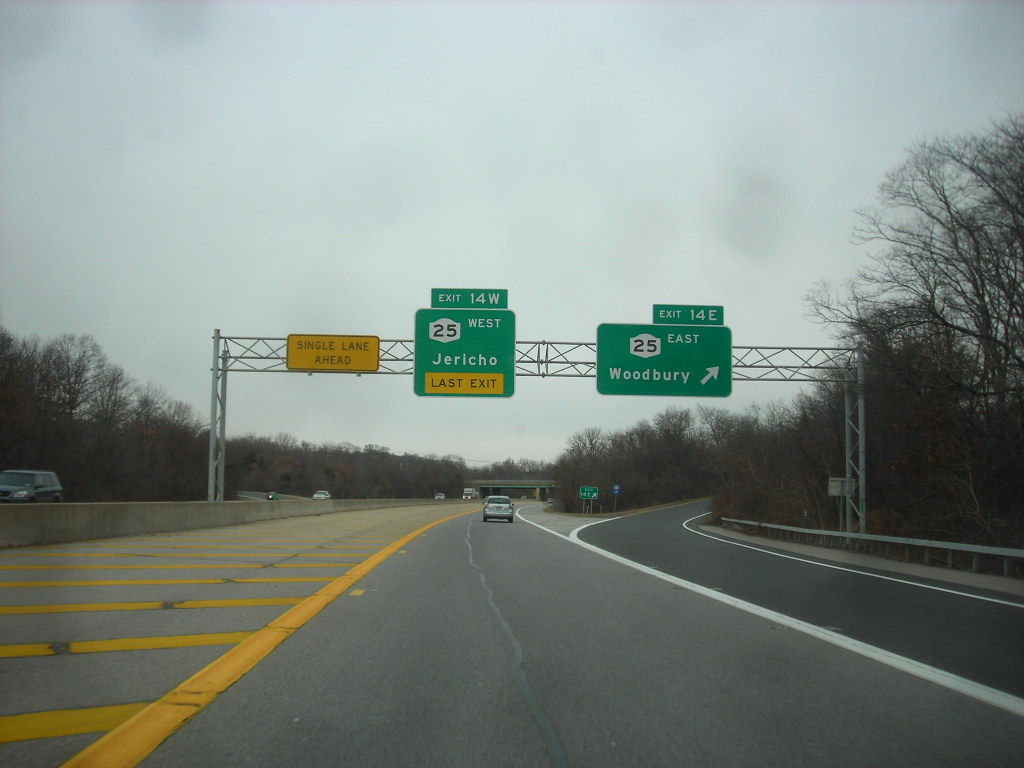
NY 135 at exit 14E in Syosset

After a while, the expressway passes the North Wantagh Park, and connects to the Southern State Parkway at exit 4. There, the expressway makes a curve to the northeast, crossing over Cordwood Lane on an overpass. The direction of the expressway begins to straighten, until exit 5, where it encounters NY 107. Soon after, the expressway comes upon exit 6, which is for Boundary Avenue (CR 97). From there, the expressway turns to the north and begins to parallel the Bethpage State Parkway as it meets NY 24 (Hempstead Turnpike).

North of NY 24 in Bethpage, NY 135 has an exit leading to Powell Avenue and Plainview Road, the latter serving as a local continuation of, and connection to, the Bethpage State Parkway. At this point, the median of the expressway widens as the route heads northward. The wide median was originally constructed to allow the Bethpage Parkway to be extended north to the Caumsett State Parkway and Caumsett State Park. The wide median ends just before exit 9 as the lanes of NY 135 come back together for the exit with Plainview Road and Broadway. After interchange 9, the expressway enters Plainview as it crosses over Haypath Road.

As the expressway passes through Plainview it passes beneath Old Country Road (CR 25) at exit 10. Further north, the highway passes below Southern Parkway, where there is a southbound exit to Wallace Drive and a northbound entrance from Radcliffe Road just north of the underpass. Further north of Southern Parkway, NY 135 comes upon the Northern State Parkway at exit 12. Just after, there is a partial cloverleaf interchange (exit 13) with the Long Island Expressway (I-495) in Locust Grove. The expressway continues north of I-495, heading through Locust Grove to interchanges 14E and 14W. Here, NY 135 ends and merges into NY 25 (the Jericho Turnpike). A stub built for the possible extension of the expressway sits nearby.

== History ==
=== Planning and construction ===
In 1954, the New York State Department of Public Works (NYSDPW) unveiled plans for a six-lane expressway that would go from the Wantagh State Parkway in Wantagh to NY 106 in Oyster Bay. Unlike the Western Nassau Expressway, a highway proposed two years earlier that would go through densely populated areas in western Nassau County, this roadway would go through lightly populated areas, meaning that acquiring the necessary right-of-way would be easier. Under Robert Moses' original plans for the highway, the northern terminus of the expressway would be placed near brand new local ferry terminals in Oyster Bay. From there, commuters could connect to the city of Stamford, Connecticut, 12 miles (19 km) to the north by way of ferries across Long Island Sound. The proposed highway was added to the New York State Highway Law as follows, with annotations in brackets:

... Seaford–Oyster Bay expressway, beginning at a point on the Wantagh parkway in the vicinity of the hamlet of Wantagh, thence running generally through or near the hamlets of Seaford, Bethpage and Plainview to a point on state highway nine thousand twenty-one [NY 106] south of the village of Oyster Bay; ...

One of the major problems with the proposed alignment of the expressway was that it divided each community that it passed through. This was met by protests from all of the communities. To remedy the concerns, Lewis Waters, the Oyster Bay Town Supervisor, proposed a new alignment for the expressway. Under his plan, it would now begin at the Ocean Parkway in Tobay Beach, cross Great South Bay and enter West Amityville at Clocks Boulevard. From West Amityville, the expressway was to turn to the northeast near the current-day Sunrise Mall, and progress its way through Massapequa and Farmingdale into Bethpage State Park. The highway was to cross through Bethpage State Park using the old right-of-way for the Bethpage State Parkway through the communities of Old Bethpage and Plainview. From there, it would veer to the northwest, approaching and intersecting with the Jericho Turnpike (NY 25) about 0.75-mile (1.21 km) from its current northern terminus. At the Long Island Rail Road's Port Jefferson Branch, it would follow the originally planned alignment, but would end at NY 25A instead of NY 106.

This plan, supported by the residents of Oyster Bay, would require the acquisition of 185 residential homes. In comparison, the alignment planned by Moses would result in the elimination of 450 homes. However, Moses' plan won out, to much of their dismay.

In 1958, NYSDPW acquired the right-of-way for the highway. From Seaford north to the Southern State Parkway near Plainedge, the right-of-way followed the alignment of Seamans Neck Road, then an uninterrupted local road extending from Merrick Road in Seaford north to NY 107 and Union Avenue in Plainedge. Also in 1958, the Nassau County Department of Public Works signed over 100 county highways around the county. According to the 1959 Master Plan for the county by the public works department, Seamans Neck Road was initially designated as CR 191, but only from Merrick Road to the proposed interchange between the expressway and NY 105, where Seamans Neck Road would meet the new highway. The CR 191 designation was eventually eliminated.

Construction commenced on the expressway a year later, with the section from Old Country Road (exit 10) to Jericho Turnpike (exits 14E and 14W) opening in June 1962. Construction continued rapidly, with the section from Old Country Road down to the Southern State Parkway (exit 4) being completed only a year later. The incomplete expressway was designated as NY 135 by 1964.

From there, the construction slowed, with the final piece from Merrick Road (CR 27) to the Southern State Parkway opening to traffic in late 1969. The resulting highway extended for 10.66 miles (17.16 km) from Seaford to Syosset—but not to Oyster Bay as its name implied.

=== Extension proposals ===
Seaford–Oyster Bay Expressway
- Location: North end: I-95 and I-287 interchange in Rye, NY; South end: Wantagh State Parkway at the Jones Beach Causeway in Seaford, NY

A map showing the built (black) and unbuilt (red) segments of the Seaford–Oyster Bay Expressway, including the Rye–Oyster Bay crossing.

==== Bridge to Rye ====
In 1957, a plan for a bridge to Westchester County across Long Island Sound was first proposed by Charles H. Sells, a former commissioner for the New York State Department of Public Works. His proposal for the Oyster Bay–Rye Bridge, along with the eastern Orient Point–Watch Hill Bridge were two proposed bridge routes off Long Island. Sells, however, suggested that the bridges not be constructed until Long Island's traffic and commuting began to increase.

In seven years, Long Island underwent the transformation that Sells had expected, and the east–west arterials between Long Island and New York City, such as the Northern State Parkway and the Long Island Expressway, were congested with commuters. Motorists bound for New England or upstate regions of New York had to take either the Throgs Neck Bridge or the Bronx–Whitestone Bridge, and both bridges were already reaching their designed capacities. Robert Moses, chairman of the Triborough Bridge and Tunnel Authority, worked with the Department of Public Works to commission a $150,000 (1964 USD) study by the firm Madigan-Hyland to study the feasibility of a bridge across the sound.

Moses revealed the results of the study to the Nassau and Suffolk Regional Planning Board in February 1966. The Oyster Bay–Rye Bridge (originally the Bayville–Rye Bridge) was proposed to complete the Interstate 287 (I-287) beltway around the New York Metropolitan Area. This was to be done by constructing a 6.1-mile-long (9.8 km) cable-stayed suspension bridge from the Cross-Westchester Expressway (I-287) in Rye to the Seaford–Oyster Bay Expressway (NY 135) in Nassau County. The proposed bridge was to cost $150 million (1966 USD) and had the support of Governor Nelson Rockefeller and many officials on Long Island.

However, Moses ran into a problem once the proposal was brought to the Federal Highway Administration. At this point, opposition to the bridge began to form on both sides of Long Island Sound. In addition, plans to turn the Oyster Bay area into a bird sanctuary and a protected park made working on the highway harder as building on such protected places is forbidden by law. Faced with growing opposition, Governor Rockefeller cancelled the plans for the bridge on June 20, 1973, nine years after the first proposal by Moses.

Nine ideas were discussed in the 1950s, 1960s, and 1970s, but all were cancelled. Some were reconsidered during the 1990s, but the New York State Department of Transportation (NYSDOT) backed away from the idea in belief that it would not relieve congestion.

==== Highway extensions ====
Since the demise of the proposed bridge across Long Island Sound, several proposed northward extensions of NY 135 have arisen, none of which have been acted on. In 1973, the Tri-State Transportation Commission proposed restudying the idea of extending the expressway northward back to its originally-planned northern terminus, the hamlet of Oyster Bay, even though the bridge project was shelved. The commission stated, "With the abandonment of the Oyster Bay–Rye Bridge proposal, the need to extend the Seaford–Oyster Bay Expressway northward to NY 25A or NY 106 should be restudied." They added that the study would be probable, even with the abandonment of working on the NY 135 corridor.

In 1990, the Long Island Regional Planning Board came up with a proposed multibillion-dollar plan to expand the capacities of state and county highways and to improve all major roads to "satisfactory" levels by 2010. The proposal also revisited the idea of extending the Seaford–Oyster Bay Expressway to NY 25A in Oyster Bay via the right-of-way bought in the 1960s. NYSDOT reconsidered the idea a decade later in 2000, saying it would relieve congestion in the area. They indicated that the extension may be built as either a "full-build" expressway or a four-lane arterial boulevard to NY 25A. However, there are no plans to do either at this time.

In 2007, a developer proposed the idea of crossing Long Island Sound by way of a tunnel instead of a bridge. The tunnel would be 17 miles (27 km) long and run from Bayville to Rye, just as the original bridge would have. To prevent the noticeable tunnel, the developer proposed building a park atop the entrance with ball fields, tennis courts, and several other amenities.

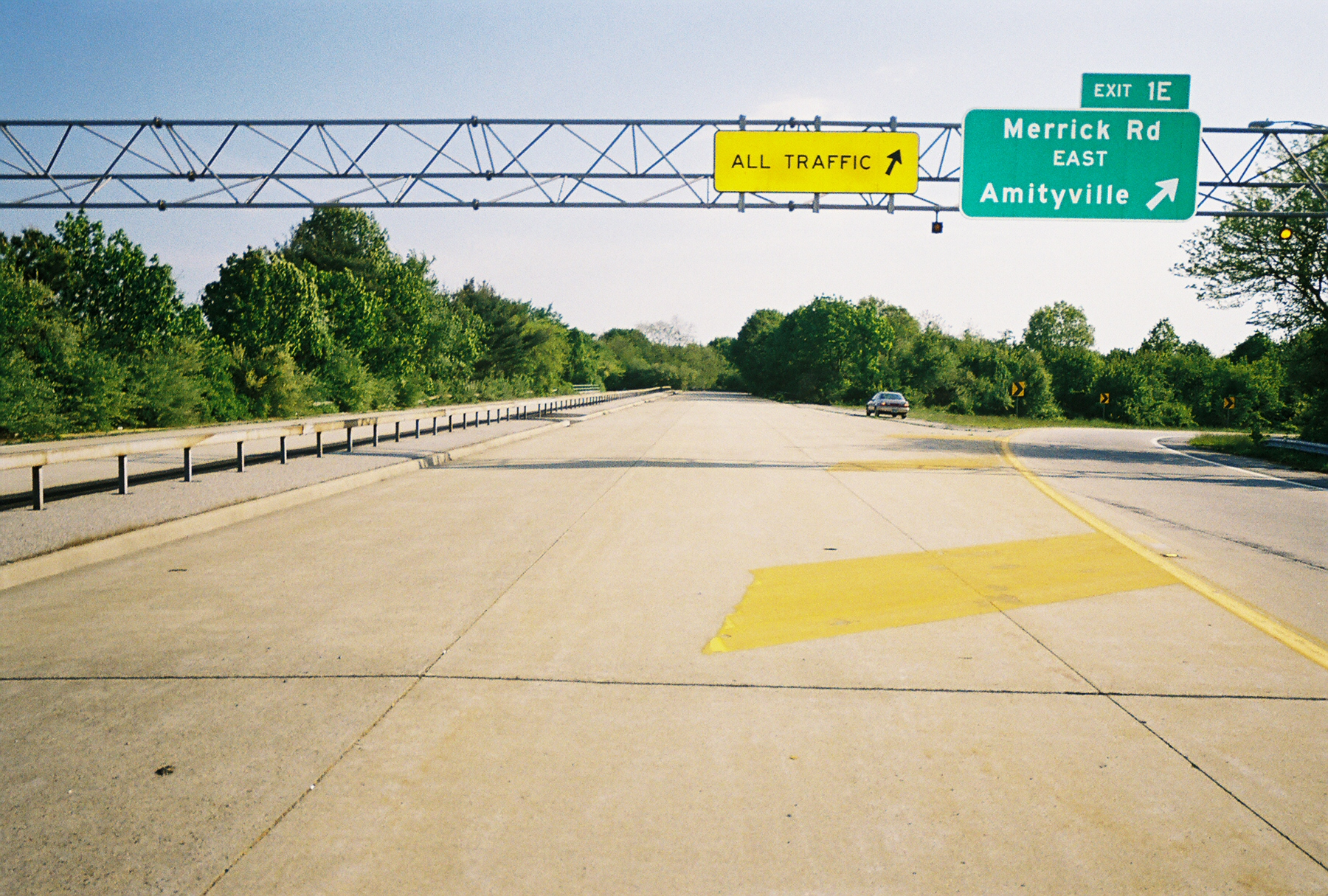
South stub end of the expressway

When the first proposals for a southern extension of NY 135 came out in 1967, around 25 families were relocated to clear a 7.3 acres (30,000 m^{2}) right-of-way for the highway. By 1975, the Tri-State Transportation Commission proposed a plan to extend the highway south to the Wantagh State Parkway, which was NY 135's originally-planned southern terminus. This would have provided another connection to Jones Beach via the Wantagh Parkway. However, the idea was not acted upon and was shelved by NYSDOT in 1980. The right-of-way for the extension was held onto by the state until 2004 when they sold it to Nassau County. Nassau County plans to build a county recreational trail along that right-of-way.

=== Recent history and proposals ===
There are a number of projects either in progress or in development for NY 135. In the 2000s, NYSDOT repaired segments of NY 135, along with many other highways in Nassau and nearby Suffolk counties, where the concrete was beginning to wear out. The project was projected to end in mid-2008, but the department has not updated their project site with the construction. In late 2006, development began on a project to construct a 100-parking space Park & Ride at the interchange of NY 135 and NY 25. Work on the project was expected to begin in mid-2015 and end in the middle of 2016. Funds would come from the federal government and the state of New York.

Another planned NYSDOT project was the replacement of the steel barrier for the median of NY 135 from Merrick Road to NY 24. The department replaced it with a normal concrete barrier and also resurfaced the entire stretch of highway. The project was to cost $41.6 million of state and federal funding and begin in late 2010 and early 2011. It was expected to be completed by early 2012.

At 9:30 a.m. on May 24, 1988, a tanker truck loaded with as much as 3,000 imperial gallons (14,000 L) of propane fuel overturned and exploded into flames along the expressway. This caused major traffic delays and congestion as police had to shut down three of the major transportation routes in the area. Nassau County police ordered the evacuation of 1,000 residents in the immediate area, along with nearby commuter routes, the Sunrise Highway and Long Island Rail Road's Montauk Branch. With the possibility of an explosion, emergency personnel could not approach the tanker. Since the fire was close to the LIRR station in Seaford, a spokesman said that they had shut all service down from Wantagh to Massapequa. The Long Island Rail Road attempted using buses, but with the congestion becoming worse, they routed the buses to Hicksville, where the passengers would take a diesel train to Bethpage and nearby Babylon to continue progress eastward. The Seaford–Oyster Bay Expressway was shut down from Merrick Road to the Southern State Parkway. Police reported that the tanker broke a rear axle, and skidded, causing it to overturn. The tank ruptured, starting the blaze. The driver, a middle-aged man from Westbury, escaped with few injuries.

When the Seaford–Oyster Bay Expressway was first built, the highway was known as the Wantagh–Oyster Bay Expressway. The route was changed to its current name in 1967. The change was made both to avoid confusion with the Wantagh Parkway and to accommodate a request from the community of Seaford to popularize their town. There have also been attempts to rename the expressway with dedications to various Presidents of the United States such as Theodore Roosevelt and Ronald Reagan. However, in March 2002, the New York State Legislature officially dedicated the expressway after Ralph J. Marino, a New York State Senator from Long Island. At the time, the designation was a tribute to Marino; however, he died just two weeks later.

Between the Powell Avenue and Broadway / Plainview Road interchanges along the expressway, the highway is divided with a large median. The lane alignment was set up so that the proposed extension of the Bethpage State Parkway would have run within the median of NY 135. The parkway would have followed the highway for a short distance before turning to the southeast and away from NY 135. By making this possible, the Bethpage Parkway would likely have to have been upgraded from its current super-two configuration into a four-lane highway.

NYSDOT had created a project page for the Bethpage Parkway extension, which was viewed by the department as a long-term project. As part of the project, the parkway would have been extended north from the traffic circle with Plainview Road to NY 135. The project was tentatively scheduled to start in mid-2025 and wrap up in early 2027 and cost $27.9 million. The page was taken down by November 2010.

== Exit list ==
County	Location	mi	km	Exit	Destinations	Notes
Nassau	Seaford	0.00	0.00	1	Merrick Road – Amityville, Freeport	Southern terminus; signed as exits 1E (east) and 1W (west); former NY 27A
Nassau	Seaford	0.32	0.51	2	To NY 27 – New York, Montauk	Northbound exit only; access via Seamans Neck Road
Nassau	Seaford	0.93	1.50	2	NY 27 – New York, Montauk	Southbound exit and northbound entrance; signed as exits 2E (east) and 2W (west)
Nassau	Seaford–Wantagh line	1.25	2.01	3	To NY 105 – Massapequa, North Bellmore	Northbound exit and southbound entrance; access via Seamans Neck Road
Nassau	North Wantagh	2.11	3.40	3	NY 105 – Massapequa, North Bellmore	Southbound exit and northbound entrance; access via Seamans Neck Road
Nassau	North Wantagh–Levittown line	2.85– 2.19	4.59– 3.52	4	Southern State Parkway – East Islip, New York	Signed as exits 4E (east) and 4W (west); exits 28AS-N on Southern State Parkway
Nassau	North Massapequa	3.11– 3.64	5.01– 5.86	5	NY 107 – Hicksville, Massapequa	
Nassau	North Massapequa–Plainedge line	3.60– 4.17	5.79– 6.71	6	Boundary Avenue – Plainedge	
Nassau	Plainedge	4.16– 4.82	6.69– 7.76	7	NY 24 – Farmingdale, Hempstead	Signed as exits 7E (east) and 7W (west)
Nassau	Bethpage	5.33– 5.96	8.58– 9.59	8	Powell Avenue – Bethpage, Bethpage Park	
Nassau	Bethpage	6.08– 6.95	9.78– 11.18	9	Plainview Road / Broadway – Plainview, Bethpage	Signed for Plainview Road/Plainview northbound, Broadway/Bethpage southbound
Nassau	Plainview	7.51– 8.16	12.09– 13.13	10	Old Country Road – Plainview, Hicksville	
Nassau	Plainview	8.64– 9.07	13.90– 14.60	11	Wallace Drive	Southbound exit only, northbound entrance via Radcliffe Road
Nassau	Plainview–Woodbury line	9.01– 9.38	14.50– 15.10	12	Northern State Parkway – New York, Hauppauge	No southbound access to Parkway west; signed as exits 12E (east) and 12W (west); exits 36A–B on Northern State Parkway
Nassau	Woodbury–Syosset line	9.41– 10.08	15.14– 16.22	13	I-495 – Riverhead, New York	Signed as exits 13E (east) and 13W (west); exits 44S-N on I-495
Nassau	Woodbury–Syosset line	10.78	17.35	14	NY 25 – Jericho, Woodbury	Northern terminus; signed as exits 14E (east) and 14W (west)
1.000 mi = 1.609 km; 1.000 km = 0.621 mi: Closed/former; Incomplete access; Proposed

== See also ==
- List of county routes in Nassau County, New York
- Babylon–Northport Expressway
