= New York State Route 107 =

Highway on Long Island, New York

New York State Route 107
- Map of Nassau County on Long Island, with NY 107 highlighted in red.

Route information
- Maintained by NYSDOT
- Length: 17.07 mi (27.47 km)
- Existed: 1930–present

Major junctions
- South end: Merrick Road in Massapequa
- Southern State Parkway in Massapequa; NY 135 in Plainedge; I-495 / Northern State Parkway in Jericho; NY 25 / NY 106 in Jericho
- North end: Pratt Boulevard / Pulaski Street in Glen Cove

Location
- Country: United States
- State: New York
- Counties: Nassau

Highway system
- New York Highways; Interstate; US; State; Reference; Parkways
← NY 106	→ NY 108

New York State Route 107 (NY 107) is a 17.07-mile (27.47 km) state highway in Nassau County, New York, that serves several communities in the Town of Oyster Bay

The route begins at an intersection with Merrick Road (unsigned CR 27) in Massapequa. South of Hicksville, it is named Hicksville Road; within Hicksville and Jericho, it is Broadway; from Jericho north to near the Glen Cove border, it is Cedar Swamp Road; and within Glen Cove, it follows Pratt Boulevard. The state route terminates at an intersection with Pulaski Street in Glen Cove, but Pratt Boulevard continues west for a short distance as a county road (CR 243) to Brewster Street.

Route 107 is the only New York State Highway on Long Island to enter a city other than New York City. The route connects with several major parkways and expressways and has a concurrency with NY 106 through Hicksville and Jericho Gardens. The route is historically known as the Massapequa Glen Cove Highway.

== Route description ==
=== Massapequa to Hicksville ===
NY 107 begins at an intersection with Merrick Road (CR 27, former NY 27A) in Massapequa as a northern continuation of Division Avenue. NY 107 proceeds north on Hicksville Road as a two-lane commercial street through Massapequa, passing west of Fairfield Elementary School as it enters a residential section of town. At the junction with Broadway (CR 149), NY 107 proceeds northwest on Hicksville Road, crossing into the town of Oyster Bay. NY 107 then crosses an intersection with NY 27 (Sunrise Highway), and soon passes the parking lot for Long Island Rail Road's Massapequa station.

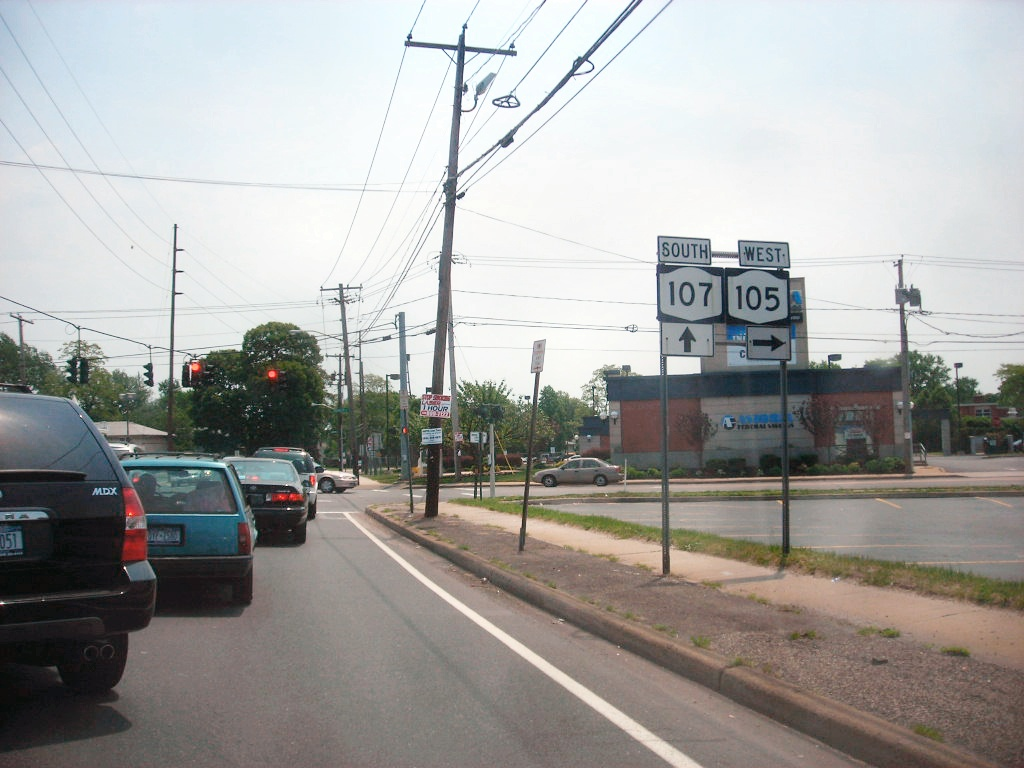
NY 107 southbound at the intersection with NY 105 in Massapequa

After crossing under the railroad tracks, NY 107 bends northeast on Hicksville Road, passing a second parking lot for the station. After a bend to the northwest at Michigan Avenue, the route remains a two-lane residential street, After an intersection with Ontario Street, the route passes a commercial stretch on the western side of the roadway and into an intersection with the eastern terminus of NY 105 (Jerusalem Avenue). NY 107 continues northward, passing some strip malls before proceeding northwest, passing a mix of residences and businesses. The route remains two-lanes and soon becomes primarily residential as it turns northward through the North Massapequa section of Oyster Bay. Just after the intersection with Alken Avenue, NY 107 enters a partial cloverleaf interchange with Southern State Parkway (exit 29).

After the Southern State Parkway, NY 107 bends northward, now in the Plainedge section of Oyster Bay. Through Plainedge, the route is a two-lane commercial street, passing a large strip mall and the Plainedge Public Library. The route then enters an interchange with NY 135 (the Seaford–Oyster Bay Expressway). After crossing under the expressway, the route becomes residential, bending northwest at a junction with Gail Drive. A short distance later, the route enters a junction with Stewart Avenue (CR 35) and Boundary Avenue in front of the Plainedge Shopping Center. NY 107 continues northwest on Hicksville Road as a two-lane residential street. The route becomes commercial at a junction with Seamans Neck Road (CR 191), soon intersecting NY 24 (Hempstead Turnpike) at-grade.

After the junction with NY 24, NY 107 proceeds northwest as a four-lane residential boulevard through the Bethpage section. Now known as Hicksville–Massapequa Road, NY 107 crosses into the town of Hempstead and enters an at-grade interchange with the northern terminus of North Wantagh Avenue (CR 189). This junction once served as the northern terminus of NY 115 until the early 1970s. The route then intersects with Central Avenue. The route remains four lanes, bending northwest and becomes a commercial boulevard, re-entering the town of Oyster Bay. The route becomes a four lane street once again after a junction with Hicksville Road.

=== Hicksville to Glen Cove ===
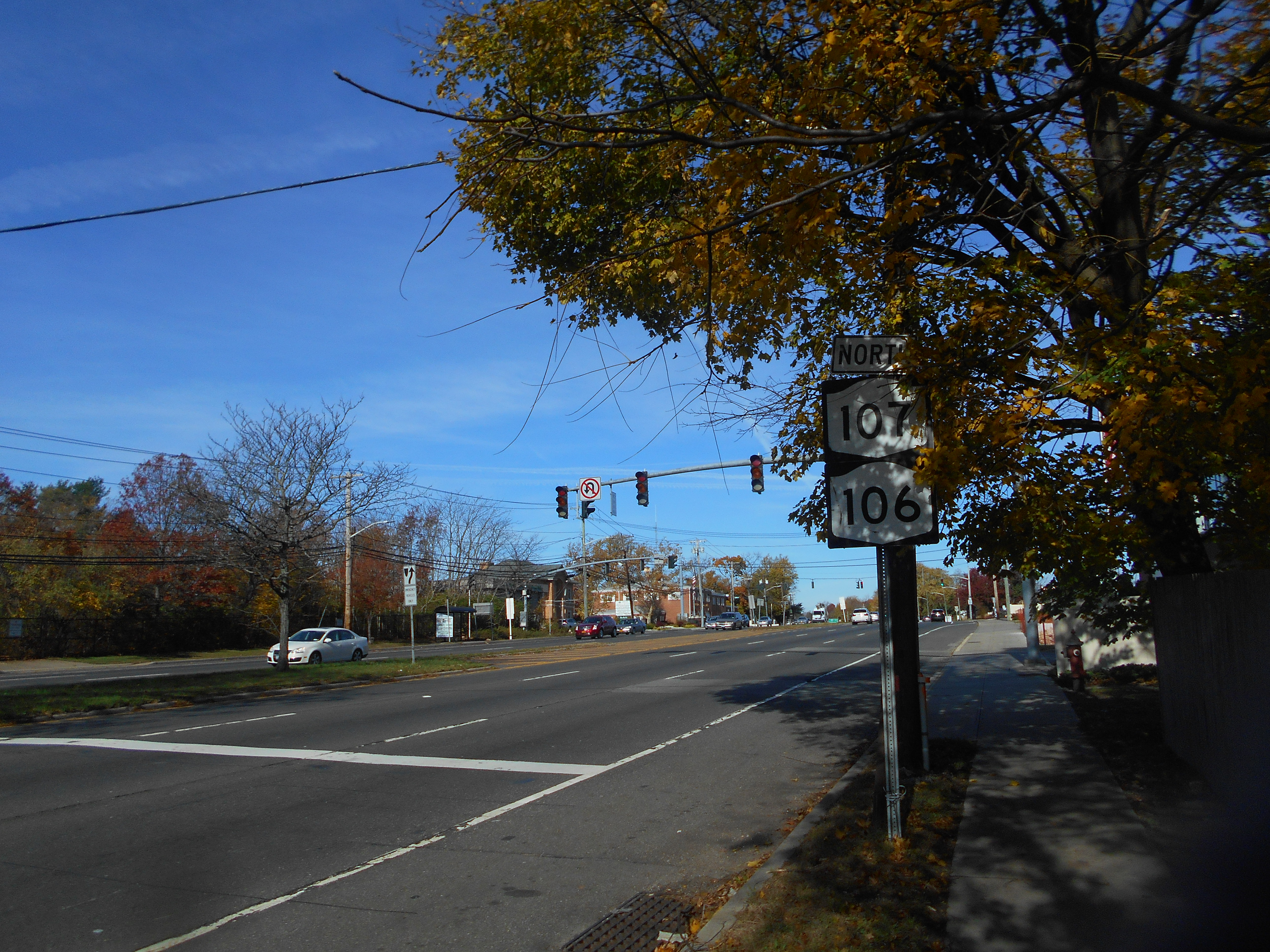
NY 106 and NY 107 northbound in Jericho

NY 107 proceeds northwest, becoming a two-lane commercial and industrial street through Oyster Bay, changing names to South Broadway and intersecting with South Oyster Bay Road (CR 9). The route enters the Hicksville section of Oyster Bay as a four-lane commercial boulevard, becoming a divided highway once again at Gerald Avenue. NY 107 continues northwest as the divided roadway, intersecting with Old Country Road (CR 25) as a four-lane commercial street. NY 107 then enters downtown Hicksville, crossing under a railroad junction of the Long Island Rail Road just east of the Hicksville. After crossing under the tracks, NY 107 continues northwest as a four-lane street, entering an at-grade interchange with NY 106 (Newbridge Road).

After the at-grade interchange, NY 106 and NY 107 become concurrent as North Broadway, a four-lane boulevard through Hicksville. Passing east of Broadway Mall, the route became a six-lane boulevard through the Jericho Gardens section of Oyster Bay. A short distance after, NY 106 and NY 107 enter a cloverleaf interchange with the Northern State Parkway (exit 35). After that, the route crosses South Marginal Road at-grade, then entering exit 41, a cloverleaf interchange with the Long Island Expressway (I-495). After that interchange, NY 106 and NY 107 continue northwest as North Broadway, a six-lane divided boulevard. Entering the East Birchwood section of Oyster Bay, they enter another cloverleaf interchange, this time with NY 25 (the Jericho Turnpike). Immediately after NY 25, NY 106 and NY 107 enter an at-grade intersection, where NY 106 proceeds northeast on Jericho–East Norwich Road, while NY 107 continues north on Cedar Swamp Road.

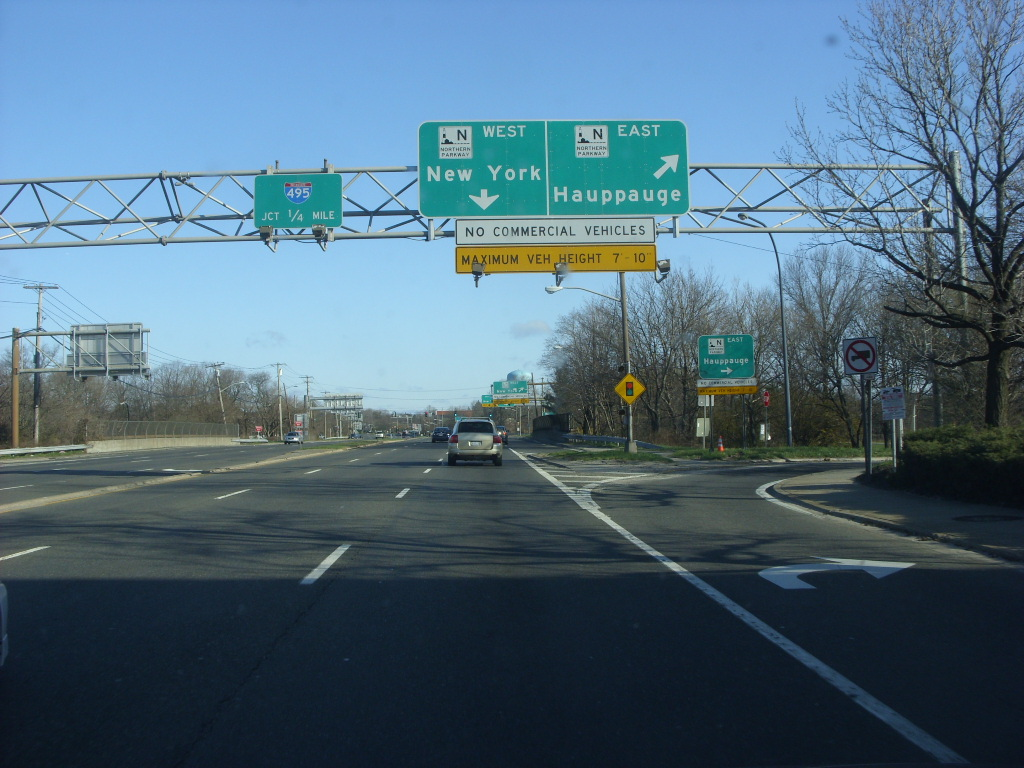
NY 106/NY 107 northbound at the interchange with the Northern State Parkway in Jericho Gardens

NY 107 leaves East Birchwood on Cedar Swamp Road, passing south of Jericho HighSchool as it winds northwest as a four-lane residential boulevard. It also passes east of SUNY Old Westbury in the Brookville section, and the route condenses to a two-lane residential street, passing south of the Tam O Shatner Country Club as it winds west. Passing north of a residential complex, NY 107 bends northwestward once again, crossing through several mansions and intersecting with Wheatley Road. At Wheatley Road, NY 107 enters the village of Upper Brookville, passing east of Long Island University's CW Post as it becomes four-lanes and enters an at-grade intersection with NY 25A (Northern Boulevard). After NY 25A, NY 107 enters Old Brookville village, remaining a two-lane residential road. The route makes a short bend to the northwest at Hoaglands Lane, winding north Old Brookville into an interchange with the Glen Cove Arterial Highway (Glen Cove Road) (NY 900B) along with Glen Head Road.

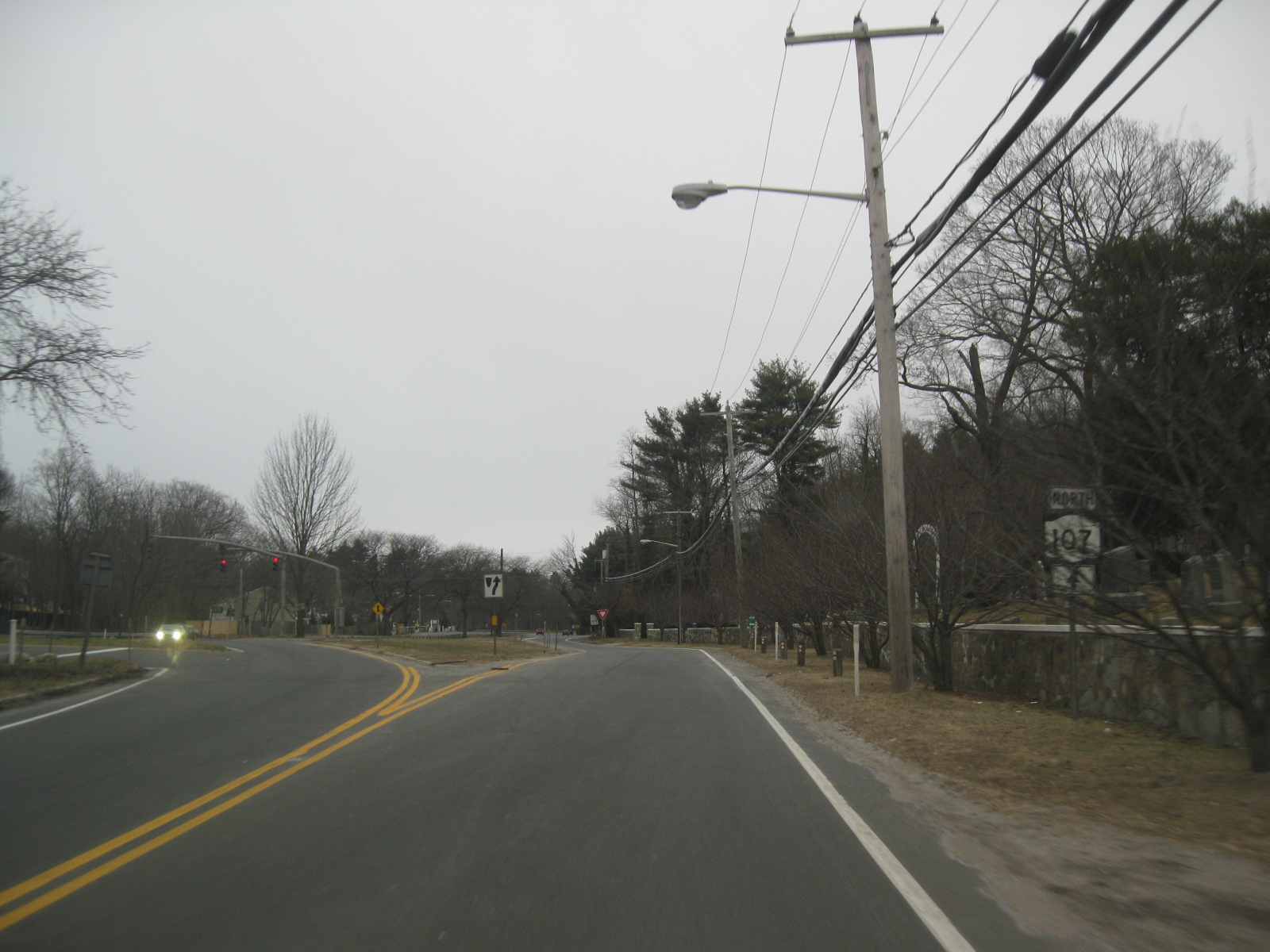
NY 107 at the junction with NY 900B (Glen Cove Road) in Glen Head

At that junction, NY 107 becomes concurrent with Glen Cove Road, passing east of the Glen Head Country Club. The route runs north as a four-lane boulevard, winding through the Glen Head section of Oyster Bay. A short distance later, NY 107 intersects with another portion of Cedar Swamp Road, which forks to the northeast. After this junction, NY 107 becomes a four-lane expressway known as Pratt Boulevard through Glen Head, with the median being replaced by a concrete barrier. Along this stretch, NY 107 crosses under the Long Island Rail Road's Oyster Bay Branch, just west of the Glen Street station. Now in the city of Glen Cove, NY 107 passes the water tower and bends northwest.

Through Glen Cove, NY 107 remains a four-lane expressway. A short distance later, NY 107 passes several businesses to the south, intersecting with Pulaski Street. This intersection serves as the northern terminus of NY 107, while Pratt Boulevard continues west, connecting NY 107 to Brewster Street and Glen Cove Avenue.

== History ==
Historically known as the Massapequa Glen Cove Highway, NY 107 was assigned as part of the 1930 renumbering of state highways in New York, extending from the hamlet of Massapequa on South Oyster Bay to the city of Glen Cove on Long Island Sound. Originally, NY 107 followed Cedar Swamp Road and Sea Cliff Avenue (now Christopher Columbus Avenue) to Sea Cliff, where it ended at the junction of Sea Cliff Avenue and Prospect Avenue. It was realigned c. 1939 to continue to Glen Cove by way of Cedar Swamp Avenue and Glen Street. In the mid-1960s, the northernmost segment of NY 107 was moved onto the Glen Cove Arterial Highway, a new bypass of Glen Street. A study by the New York State Department of Transportation suggested the highway would connect to one of two proposed bridges to Rye across Long Island Sound.

== Major intersections ==
The entire route is in Nassau County.

Location	mi	km	Destinations	Notes
Massapequa	0.00	0.00	Merrick Road	Southern terminus; former NY 27A
Massapequa	0.65	1.05	NY 27 (Sunrise Highway)	
Massapequa–North Massapequa line	1.14	1.83	NY 105 west (Jerusalem Avenue)	Eastern terminus of NY 105
North Massapequa	2.58	4.15	Southern State Parkway – New York, East Islip	Exits 29S-N on Southern State Parkway
North Massapequa	3.13	5.04	NY 135 – Seaford, Syosset	Same-directional access only; exit 5 on NY 135
Plainedge	4.20	6.76	NY 24 (Hempstead Turnpike)	
Hicksville	8.11	13.05	NY 106 south – Bellmore	Southern end of NY 106 concurrency
Jericho	8.80	14.16	Northern State Parkway – New York, Hauppauge	Exits 35S-N on Northern State Parkway
Jericho	8.94	14.39	I-495 – New York, Riverhead	Exit 41 on I-495
Jericho	9.48	15.26	NY 25 – New York, Riverhead	Cloverleaf interchange
Jericho	9.62	15.48	NY 106 north – Oyster Bay	Northern end of NY 106 concurrency
Old Brookville–Brookville– Upper Brookville village tripoint	13.18	21.21	NY 25A (Northern Boulevard) to I-495 west – LIU Post, Roslyn, Huntington	
Glen Head	15.01	24.16	Glen Cove Road (NY 900B south)	Southern end of Glen Cove Road concurrency
Glen Cove	15.88	25.56	Cedar Swamp Road – Sea Cliff	
Glen Cove	15.88	25.56	Southern end of limited-access section	
Glen Cove	17.07	27.47	Pratt Boulevard / Pulaski Street	Northern terminus; northern end of Glen Cove Road concurrency; at-grade intersection
1.000 mi = 1.609 km; 1.000 km = 0.621 mi: Concurrency terminus; Incomplete access
