= Brent Budowsky =

American journalist (1952–2023)

- Born: Brent Jamin Budowsky; February 28, 1952; Brooklyn, New York, U.S.
- Died: July 23, 2023 (aged 71)
- Education: George Washington University (BA); Catholic University (JD); London School of Economics (LLM)
- Political party: Democratic

Brent Jamin Budowsky (February 28, 1952 – July 23, 2023) was an American political opinion writer and columnist for The Hill.

== Early life and education ==
Brent Jamin Budowsky was born on February 28, 1952, in Brooklyn, New York. His mother was a teacher and his father was an insurance executive.

Budowsky attended Seaford High School in Seaford, New York. Budowsky received his Bachelor of Arts degree from George Washington University. He completed a Juris Doctor from the Columbus School of Law of Catholic University, which included participation in the law program of St Edmund Hall, Oxford, and a Master of Laws from the London School of Economics.

== Career ==
From the mid-1970s to 1990, Budowsky served in senior congressional staff positions including legislative assistant to former Senator Lloyd Bentsen; extensively involved with the Intelligence Identities Protection Act, and was legislative director to Representative Bill Alexander, then the Chief Deputy Majority Whip.

Budowsky worked as a political opinion writer and columnist for The Hill for over a decade.

After a brief illness, Brent Budowsky died on July 23, 2023, at the age of 71.
