= New York State Route 135 (disambiguation) =

New York State Route 135 is a north–south state highway in Nassau County, New York, United States, that was established in the early 1960s.

New York State Route 135 may also refer to:

- New York State Route 135 (1930–1935) in Westchester County
- New York State Route 135 (1937–1939) in Cayuga County
