= New York State Route 106 =

Highway on Long Island, New York

New York State Route 106
- Map of Nassau County on Long Island with NY 106 highlighted in red

Route information
- Maintained by NYSDOT
- Length: 13.28 mi (21.37 km)
- Existed: 1930–present

Major junctions
- South end: NY 105 in North Bellmore
- Southern State Parkway in North Bellmore; I-495 / Northern State Parkway in Jericho; NY 25 / NY 107 in Jericho
- North end: Bay Avenue in Oyster Bay

Location
- Country: United States
- State: New York
- Counties: Nassau

Highway system
- New York Highways; Interstate; US; State; Reference; Parkways
← NY 105	→ NY 107

New York State Route 106 (NY 106) is a 13.28-mile (21.37 km) state highway located in Nassau County, New York, in the United States. It begins in the town of Hempstead at an intersection with NY 105 in North Bellmore and heads to the north, crossing the hamlets of East Meadow and Levittown before entering the town of Oyster Bay. In Hicksville, NY 106 becomes concurrent with NY 107, an overlap colloquially known as the "One oh Six–One oh Seven". The concurrency ends immediately after an interchange with Jericho Turnpike in the hamlet of Jericho. After breaking away from NY 107, NY 106 heads north across the villages of Brookville and Muttontown and the hamlet of East Norwich to the hamlet of Oyster Bay, where the route ends one block south of Oyster Bay Harbor.

A large portion of the route, including the concurrency with NY 107, is a multi-lane, divided highway. It runs through both the relatively dense, middle-class suburbs of southern and central Nassau County and the affluent, sparsely populated suburbs of the north shore. Along the way, it accesses the Hicksville Long Island Rail Road station and the Broadway Mall, also in Hicksville. At a point north of NY 25A, the road narrows from four to two lanes on its way to Oyster Bay. South of the route's terminus at NY 105, a junction which is also that route's western terminus, Newbridge Road continues to Bellmore as County Route 106 (CR 106), an unsigned county road. NY 106 was assigned as part of the 1930 renumbering of state highways in New York.

== Route description ==
NY 106 begins at an intersection with NY 105 (Jerusalem Avenue) in the North Bellmore section of the town of Hempstead. The route proceeds northward as a four-lane arterial, passing some businesses before entering exit 25 of the Southern State Parkway. The route merges down to two-lanes after the interchange, becoming a residential street known as Newbridge Road. NY 106 bends northeastward after East Meadow Avenue, before intersecting with North Jerusalem Road. The route bends northward once again, expanding to four-lanes through Hempstead. After a short commercial stretch, NY 106 becomes residential once again, becoming a divided highway after the intersection with Bush Street.

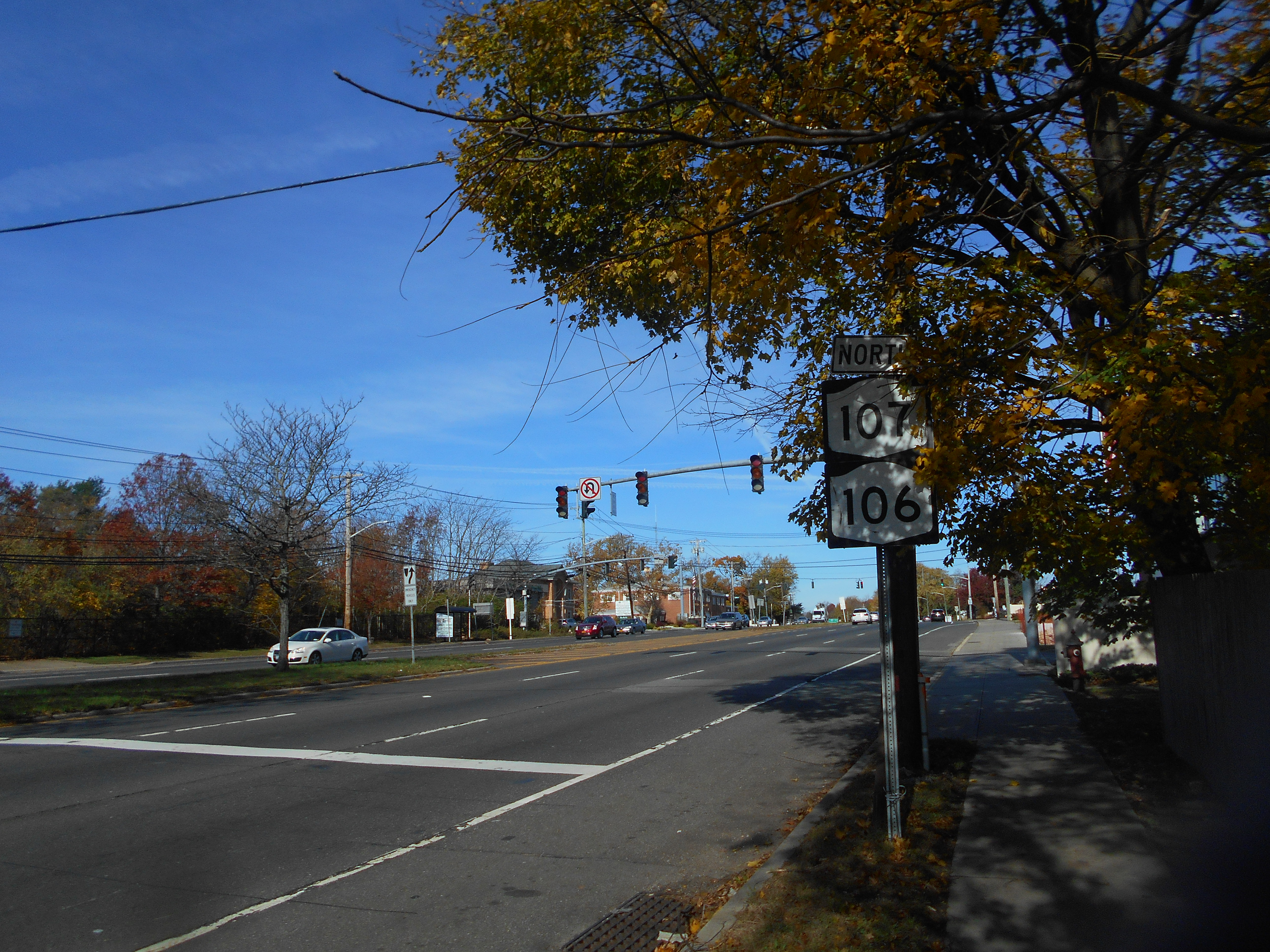
NY 106 and NY 107 northbound in Jericho

Immediately after becoming a divided highway, NY 106 bends to the northeast, intersecting with NY 24 (Hempstead Turnpike). After that, the route bends further to the northeast, crossing over the four-lane Wantagh State Parkway as North Newbridge Road, without an interchange. NY 106 becomes a residential highway as it enters the town of Oyster Bay. After the crossing, the name change reverts to Newbridge Road, entering the Hicksville section of Oyster Bay. Just north of the local high school, NY 106 intersects with Old Country Road (CR 25) before entering downtown Hicksville. Through Hicksville, the route turns northwest, crossing under a Long Island Rail Road viaduct that contains the Hicksville station.

The route becomes a commercial arterial after the viaduct, bending northward into a large at-grade junction with NY 107 (Broadway), at the southern end of their concurrency, next to the Broadway Mall. The two routes proceed northwest through the Jericho Gardens section of Oyster Bay. Like Newbridge Road, Broadway is also a divided highway, passing through a large commercial district in Oyster Bay. Passing a local casino northbound, NY 106 and NY 107 have an interchange at exit 35 of the Northern State Parkway, quickly followed by an interchange of the Long Island Expressway (I-495) (exit 41). After crossing over both highways, NY 106 and NY 107 are now in the East Birchwood section of Oyster Bay, proceeding northwest as a four-lane divided commercial arterial.

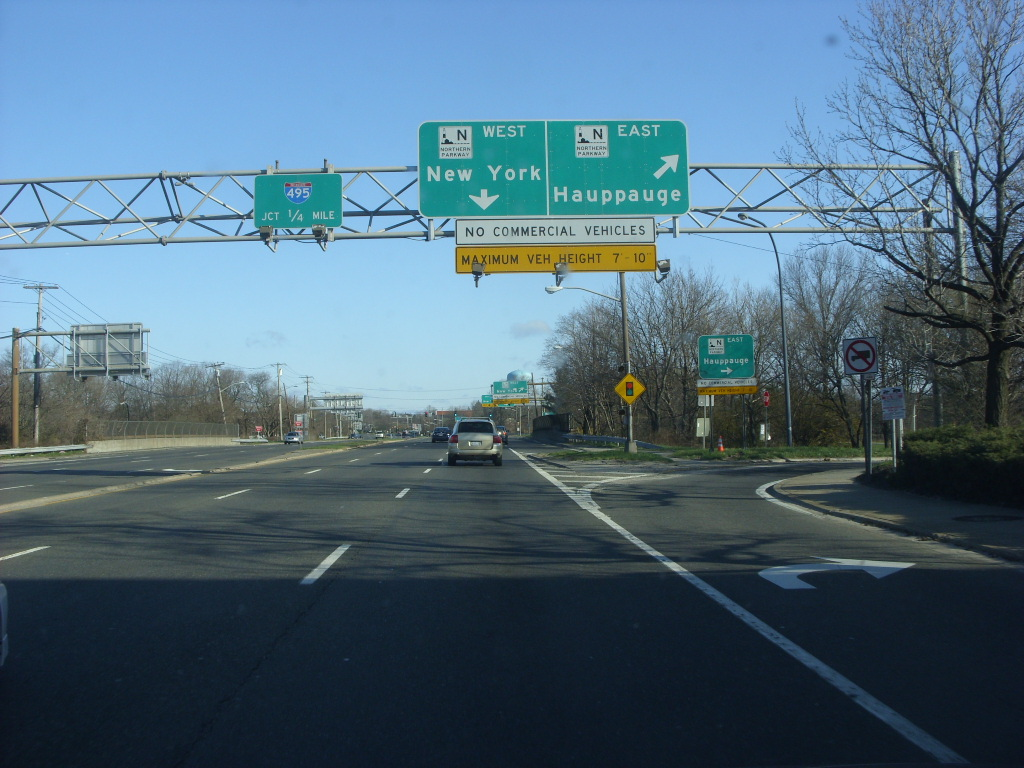
NY 106/NY 107 northbound at the interchange with the Northern State Parkway in Jericho Gardens

A short distance later, the two roadways enter an unnumbered cloverleaf interchange with NY 25 (Jericho Turnpike). Almost immediately after crossing under NY 25, NY 107 continues north along Cedar Swamp Road, while NY 106 bends northeast via an at-grade junction onti Jericho–Oyster Bay Road. NY 106 remains a four-lane divided boulevard, passing north for a short distance through Muttontown and passing east of the Muttontown Preserve. NY 106 continues north before making a gradual bend along the preserve to the northwest, re-entering Oyster Bay. After crossing back into Oyster Bay, the route becomes residential going southbound before intersecting with NY 25A (Northern Boulevard).

North of NY 25A, NY 106 changes names to Oyster Bay Road, becoming a four-lane divided commercial arterial for one city block, becoming residential as it enters the East Norwich section of Oyster Bay. With this change, the divided highway becomes a two-lane local street, bending northeast near the James H. Vernon School. The route continues north past the Upper Brookville section, changing names to Pine Hollow Road. A short distance later, it enters the hamlet of Oyster Bay, bending northeast as a two-lane commercial/residential blend street. Crossing Berry Hill Road, NY 106 bends northward, changing names to South Street, becoming mainly commercial. It becomes the main thoroughfare of Oyster Bay. After the crossing with West Main Street, NY 106 bends to the northeast a final time, passing east of the Long Island Rail Road's Oyster Bay Yard on the Oyster Bay Branch. A short distance after, NY 106 enters Commander Square and terminates at an intersection with Bay Avenue.

== History ==
The portion of NY 106 south of NY 107 in Hicksville was improved to state highway standards as part of a project contracted out by the state of New York on January 27, 1908. The road cost $57,516 to rebuild (equivalent to $2.06 million in 2025) and was added to the state highway system on November 2, 1908, as unsigned State Highway 546. State maintenance of Newbridge Road continued south of Jerusalem Avenue to Bellmore Avenue. By 1926, all of what is now NY 106 was state-maintained. In the 1930 renumbering of state highways in New York, hundreds of state-maintained highways were assigned posted route numbers for the first time. NY 106 was assigned at this time, encompassing all of its modern alignment as well as the segment of Newbridge Road leading south to Merrick Road (then part of NY 27A) in Merrick. The route was truncated to end at NY 105 by 1970, and the section of Newbridge Road south of NY 105 is now county-maintained.

== Major intersections ==
The entire route is in Nassau County.

Location	mi	km	Destinations	Notes
North Bellmore	0.00	0.00	NY 105 east (Jerusalem Avenue)	Southern terminus; western terminus of NY 105
North Bellmore	0.19	0.31	Southern State Parkway – New York, East Islip	Exits 25S-N on Southern State Parkway
East Meadow	2.33	3.75	NY 24 (Hempstead Turnpike) – Hempstead, Farmingdale	
Hicksville	5.85	9.41	NY 107 south – Massapequa	Southern end of NY 107 concurrency
Jericho	6.54	10.53	Northern State Parkway – New York, Hauppauge	Exits 35S-N on Northern State Parkway
Jericho	6.68	10.75	I-495 – New York, Riverhead	Exit 41 on I-495
Jericho	7.22	11.62	NY 25 – New York, Riverhead	Cloverleaf interchange
Jericho	7.36	11.84	NY 107 north – Glen Cove	Northern end of NY 107 concurrency
East Norwich	10.93	17.59	NY 25A – New York, Huntington	
Hamlet of Oyster Bay	13.28	21.37	Bay Avenue	Northern terminus
1.000 mi = 1.609 km; 1.000 km = 0.621 mi: Concurrency terminus
