= Old Country Road =

Road in New York, United States

- Old Country Road highlighted in red

Route information
- Maintained by NCDPW and Town of Huntington
- Length: 17.57 mi (28.28 km)

Major junctions
- West end: Herricks Road / Rockaway Avenue in Garden City
- Willis Avenue at the Mineola–Garden City line Glen Cove Road/Clinton Road at the Mineola–Garden City line Meadowbrook State Parkway in Carle Place; Wantagh State Parkway in Westbury; NY 106 in Hicksville; NY 107 in Hicksville; NY 135 in Plainview; I-495 in Melville
- East end: NY 25 in South Huntington

Location
- Country: United States
- State: New York

Highway system
- New York Highways; Interstate; US; State; Reference; Parkways

Old Country Road is a 17.57-mile-long (28.28 km) major east–west thoroughfare through central Nassau County and extending into western Suffolk County on Long Island, New York, United States. It serves many of central Nassau County's major shopping centers, including Roosevelt Field Mall. The road also forms part of the border between the towns of Hempstead and North Hempstead.

In Nassau County, Old Country Road is county-maintained as the unsigned County Route 25 (CR 25) west of Round Swamp Road – east of which it is part of the unsigned County Route 110 until reaching the Nassau–Suffolk County line.

In Suffolk County, Old Country Road is owned and maintained by the Town of Huntington.

== Route description ==
Old Country Road begins as the north–south Herricks Road (unsigned CR 8) curves to the west. It passes by the Nassau County government buildings – including the original and current Nassau County courthouses – in Mineola and northern Garden City around its intersection with Mineola Boulevard/Franklin Avenue (unsigned CR 5A). It then crosses Glen Cove Road/Clinton Road (unsigned CR 1), passing by a series of major shopping centers in Carle Place and Westbury including Roosevelt Field Mall and The Mall at the Source. It passes through Hicksville just south of where the concurrency between NY 106 and NY 107 ends. It intersects NY 135 in Plainview and briefly overlaps Round Swamp Road before continuing into western Suffolk County.

Now in Suffolk County, Old Country Road is concurrent with Round Swamp Road. It then underpasses the Long Island Expressway at exit 48, however, the LIE only signs Round Swamp Road. The route has a junction with NY 110 in Melville, then intersects New York Avenue. Shortly after, it overpasses Northern State Parkway, without an interchange. Old Country Road then has a 5-way junction with Wolf Hill Road (exit 41 on NSP) and Pidgeon Hill Road. Between Foxhurst Road and CR 35, the Dix Hills Road bridge goes over both Old Country Road and Northern State Parkway in Dix Hills. A connecting road between Old Country & Dix Hills Road exists, named Karbe Place. The road ends at a junction with NY 25.

=== Route marker ===
Former CR 25 highway marker

In the mid-1970s, Nassau County officials opted to remove all county route signs instead of funding replacements that were compliant with the federal government's Manual on Uniform Traffic Control Devices.

== Major intersections ==
County	Location	mi	km	Destinations	Notes
Nassau	Herricks	0.00	0.00	Herricks Road / Rockaway Avenue	Western terminus
Nassau	Mineola	0.62	1.00	Mineola Boulevard / Franklin Avenue	
Nassau	Carle Place	1.82	2.93	Glen Cove Road / Clinton Road	
Nassau	Carle Place	2.05– 2.17	3.30– 3.49	Meadowbrook State Parkway – Mineola, Jones Beach	Exits M1E-W on Meadowbrook State Parkway
Nassau	Westbury	3.41	5.49	Post Avenue / Merrick Avenue	
Nassau	Westbury	5.34– 5.42	8.59– 8.72	Wantagh State Parkway – Westbury, Jones Beach	Exit W2 on Wantagh State Parkway
Nassau	Hicksville	6.67	10.73	NY 106 (Newbridge Road)	
Nassau	Hicksville	6.87	11.06	Jerusalem Avenue	
Nassau	Hicksville	7.15	11.51	NY 107 (South Broadway)	
Nassau	Plainview	9.26	14.90	NY 135 – Seaford, Syosset	Exit 10 on NY 135
Nassau	Plainview	11.27	18.14	Round Swamp Road south	Western end of Round Swamp Road concurrency
Suffolk	Melville	11.47	18.46	I-495 – New York, Riverhead	Exit 48 on I-495
Suffolk	Melville	11.77	18.94	Round Swamp Road north	Eastern end of Round Swamp Road concurrency
Suffolk	Melville	13.37	21.52	NY 110 (Broadhollow Road / Walt Whitman Road)	
Suffolk	Dix Hills	17.37	27.95	CR 35 (Deer Park Road)	
Suffolk	South Huntington	17.57	28.28	NY 25 (Jericho Turnpike)	Eastern terminus
1.000 mi = 1.609 km; 1.000 km = 0.621 mi

== See also ==
- List of county routes in Nassau County, New York
- Stewart Avenue (Nassau County, New York)
