= Seaford High School =

Seaford High School may refer to several high schools in the United States:

- Seaford Senior High School, located in Seaford, Delaware
- Seaford High School (New York), located in Seaford, New York
