= Albert Abramovitz =

American painter

- Born: 1879; Riga, Russian Empire
- Died: 1963 (aged 83–84); Seaford, New York, U.S.
- Occupations: Woodcut artist, painter

Albert Abramovitz (1879–1963) was an American woodcut artist and painter. His work is in the permanent collections of the Metropolitan Museum of Art, the National Gallery of Art, and the Smithsonian American Art Museum.
