= Proctor-Hopson Circle =

Traffic median in Queens, New York

Coordinates: 40.69792°N 73.78628°W

Proctor-Hopson Circle is a semicircular traffic mall in the neighborhood of South Jamaica, Queens.

== Description ==
The semicircular traffic mall land was acquired by the city for park purposes in 1924 following the widening of Merrick Boulevard. After this road was straightened in 1924, its former route became 169th Place. In 1932, the semicircular traffic island was named after two local residents who were killed in the First World War. John Proctor and James Hopson were members of the 369th Infantry of the National Guard, known informally as the Harlem Hellfighters. Among the first in the unit from Queens to die in this war were Proctor and Hopson. In their memory, the local Veterans of Foreign Wars chapter is named the Procter-Hopson Post No. 1896.

At the park's dedication ceremony on October 23, 1932, a parade of veterans proceeded along Merrick Boulevard from King Park, greeted by local community leaders and more than 1,500 residents. It is one of the earliest parks in Queens named after an African-American figure.
