= Southern State Parkway =

Highway on Long Island, New York

Southern State Parkway
- Southern State Parkway highlighted in red

Route information
- Maintained by NYSDOT
- Length: 25.53 mi (41.09 km)
- Existed: 1927–present
- Restrictions: No commercial vehicles

Major junctions
- West end: Belt Parkway / Cross Island Parkway at the Cambria Heights–North Valley Stream line
- Meadowbrook State Parkway in North Merrick; Wantagh State Parkway in North Wantagh; NY 135 in Wantagh; Bethpage State Parkway in North Massapequa; CR 57 / Robert Moses Causeway in West Islip
- East end: Heckscher State Parkway / Sagtikos State Parkway in West Islip

Location
- Country: United States
- State: New York
- Counties: Nassau, Suffolk

Highway system
- New York Highways; Interstate; US; State; Reference; Parkways

The Southern State Parkway (also known as the Southern State or Southern Parkway) is a 25.53-mile (41.09 km) controlled-access parkway on Long Island, New York, in the United States. The parkway begins at an interchange with the Belt and Cross Island parkways in North Valley Stream, in Nassau County, and travels east to an interchange with the Sagtikos State Parkway in West Islip, Suffolk County, where it becomes the Heckscher State Parkway. The Southern State Parkway comprises the western portion of unsigned New York State Route 908M (NY 908M), with the Heckscher Parkway occupying the eastern section.

Construction of the highway, designed by Robert Moses, began in 1925. The first section of the parkway opened in 1927. It reached its original eastern terminus (Bay Shore Road) in 1949 and was extended to its current eastern terminus in 1962.

== Route description ==
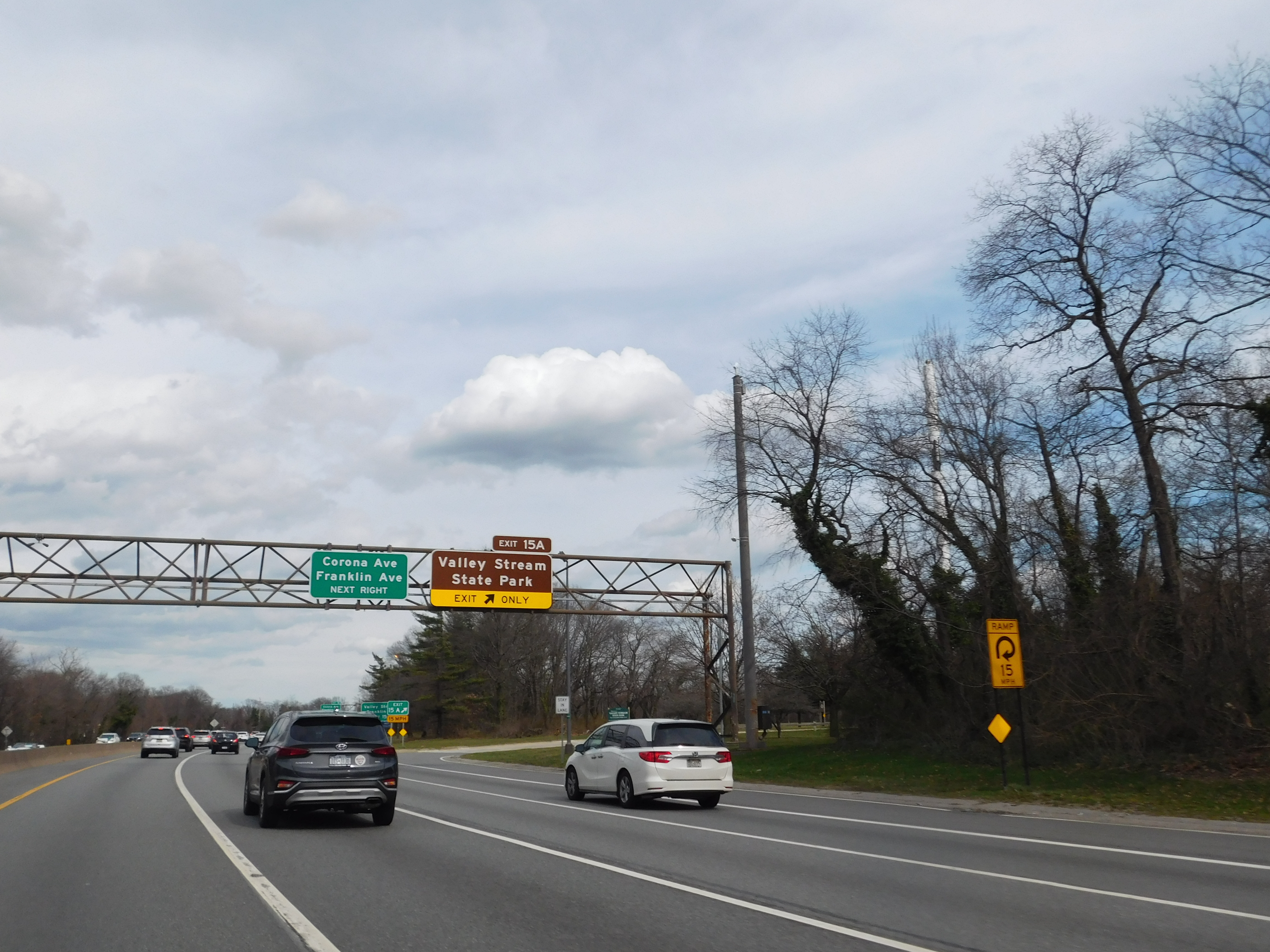
The Southern State Parkway at exit 15A (Valley Stream State Park) in Valley Stream

The Southern State Parkway begins at an interchange (exit 25A) with the Belt Parkway and the Cross Island Parkway on the Queens and Nassau County border in North Valley Stream. After the interchange, the Southern State proceeds east as an eight-lane divided parkway through North Valley Stream, passing north of St. Johns Cemetery before entering exit 13S and exit 13N, which serves Central Avenue, which connects to the Linden Boulevard that runs through Queens. Bending southeast through North Valley Stream, the parkway enters a partial diamond interchange with North Fletcher Avenue (exit 14).

Running along the northern end of Valley Stream State Park, the parkway provides a ramp designated exit 15A, which connects to the park. A short distance later, the parkway enters exit 15, which connects to Corona Avenue. Proceeding westbound, a junction is also present with Franklin Avenue (designated exit 16N). After crossing into Malverne, the Southern State enters a cloverleaf interchange with Hempstead Avenue (exit 17). Crossing a line for the Long Island Rail Road, the parkway winds through Lakeview before crossing into Hempstead Lake State Park. Crossing through the park, the parkway enters exit 18 for Eagle Avenue, where it narrows to six lanes. After crossing Hempstead Lake, the parkway enters a cloverleaf interchange with Peninsula Boulevard (exit 19). Winding north of Mercy Medical Center, the route enters Rockville Centre, passing north of Molloy College before entering a cloverleaf with exit 20 (Baldwin Road and Grand Avenue). The six-lane parkway makes a bend after exit 20, crossing through North Baldwin, and into exit 21 with Nassau Road. After making a large bend to the northeast and turning east, the Southern State enters exit 22, a cloverleaf interchange with the Meadowbrook State Parkway in North Merrick. Proceeding westbound, a ramp is present to Meadowbrook Road (exit 23). Just east of that, the parkway enters exit 24S–N, a cloverleaf interchange with Merrick Avenue. These three exits span less than one mile.

Winding northeast, the parkway enters an interchange with NY 106 (North Newbridge Road). Now in North Bellmore, exit 26 connects to South Bismark Avenue on a northeastern stretch of the parkway. Making a gradual bend eastward, the Southern State enters exit 27S–N, which is an interchange with the Wantagh State Parkway. Just east of the Wantagh, the Southern State enters an exit with Wantagh Avenue (exit 28S–N). After a short eastern stretch through the village of North Wantagh, the parkway enters an interchange with the Seaford–Oyster Bay Expressway (NY 135), designated as Exit 28A S–N.

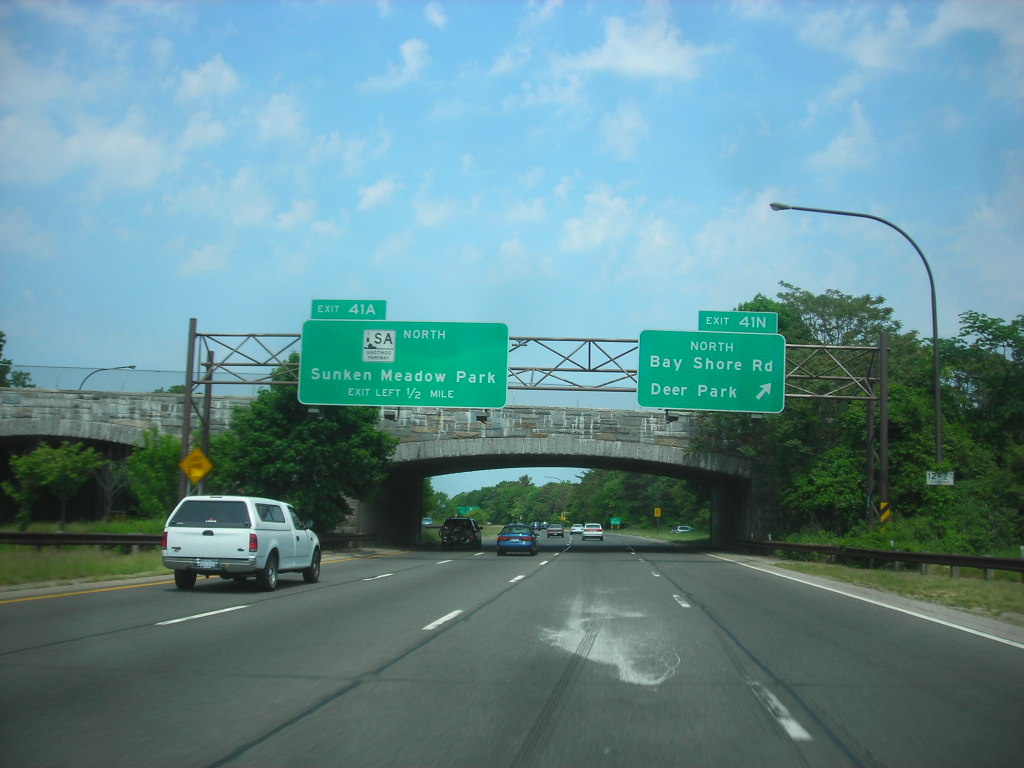
The Southern State eastbound at Exit 41N (Bay Shore Road) in West Islip

After the Seaford–Oyster Bay Expressway, the parkway enters an exit with Hicksville Road. Now in the town of Oyster Bay, the Southern State Parkway exit 30, with serves North Broadway in North Massapequa. Now in Massapequa State Park, the parkway enters exit 31, which serves as the southern terminus of the Bethpage State Parkway. Just before entering exit 32S–N, the parkway crosses into Suffolk County and the town of Babylon. After crossing into Suffolk County, the Southern State enters exit 32S–N, which serves NY 110 (Broad Hollow Road). Bending northeast through Babylon, the Southern State Parkway enters exit 33, which serves NY 109 (Farmingdale Road). Near the interchange, the parkway passes south of Republic Airport, which is connected via exit 34. Winding northeast through Babylon, the parkway enters exit 35, an interchange with CR 3 (Wellwood Avenue). Passing south of New Montefiore Cemetery, the Southern State Parkway crosses exit 36S–N, with CR 2 (Straight Path).

After winding east through Babylon, the parkway crosses through Belmont Avenue before crossing into Belmont Lake State Park. Within the park, the Southern State crosses into exit 38, which serves the park directly. After winding out of Belmont Lake State Park, the parkway enters an interchange with NY 231 (the Babylon–Northport Expressway and Deer Park Avenue). Crossing south of Guggenheim Lake, the Southern State Parkway enters exit 40, which serves the northern end of the Robert Moses Causeway. From here, the highway enters West Islip, where it connects to Bay Shore Road at exit 41S. The westbound direction of the parkway between exit 40 and exit 41 is split into a local-express lane setup for about 1 mile (1.6 km). Each half of the split is two lanes wide. After the Bay Shore Road interchange is the Sagtikos State Parkway, which is connected via exit 41A. At this interchange, the Southern State Parkway becomes the Heckscher State Parkway, which continues east and south towards Heckscher State Park.

== History ==
Construction began in 1925 under the direction of Robert Moses, to improve access to Jones Beach. The land used had originally been a conduit path for water, owned by Brooklyn. The first section of the parkway, eastward from the Queens–Nassau county line, opened in 1927. By 1932, the four-lane, undivided road extended to Suffolk County. Further extensions used more modern road construction principles. It reached its originally planned eastern terminus (Bay Shore Road) in 1949, and its current eastern terminus (Heckscher State Parkway) in 1962. Following the post-war housing boom on Long Island, the parkway was widened and straightened in numerous places to serve commuters traveling at speeds unanticipated when the road was first constructed.

Southern Parkway's first exit at Elmont is numbered 13. Cross Island Parkway once began the exit numbering scheme at the Whitestone Bridge as exit 1 and continued east on Southern State Parkway, before the construction of the Belt Parkway. The Cross Island Parkway's exit numbering scheme was changed to match the Belt Parkway's easterly number progression from the Belt's start at the Gowanus Expressway to the current Cross Island's terminus, now exit 36 at the Whitestone Bridge.

Originally constructed as a four-lane parkway, similar to Northern State Parkway, Southern Parkway was widened in the early 1950s to eight lanes from the city line to Hempstead Lake, and six lanes east of there. Since Southern Parkway was originally conceived as a "linear park" to connect Jones Beach and other state parks with the city, it was built in a meandering style appropriate for the low speeds and traffic density of the day. Stone and concrete arched overpasses were purposely constructed with low clearances for both aesthetic reasons and to ensure that commercial traffic would not be able to use the parkway system.

Of interest is the original route of the Southern State at Hempstead Lake. Before the current fill that carries the present-day parkway across the lake was built, traveling east before Eagle Avenue, the parkway veered sharply to the right, continued on what now is the park road in Hempstead Lake Park, crossed the dam at the southern end of Hempstead Lake, and turned sharply left on Peninsula Boulevard. The divided section of Peninsula Boulevard next to Hempstead Lake Park is the old Southern State Parkway, which was abandoned for a number of years until Nassau County bought the roadway in the late 1940s.

Just east of exit 32, a service area used to operate beneath the underpass of County Route 47 (CR 47, named Great Neck Road) until 1985. Exit 32, which is for NY 110, also once included CR 47. Another service area was once located between exits 17 and 18. Lastly, there were once toll booths located on the parkway between exits 13 and 14 near its western terminus at the Cross Island Parkway until 1978, although many road maps covered the toll booths until the early-to-mid-1980s.

Some interchanges were redesigned. The original version of exit 32 contained a partial cloverleaf with NY 110 and connecting ramps to and from CR 47. The original version of exit 36 was also a partial cloverleaf. The old version of exit 37 was a partial cloverleaf that included a direct entrance to the former headquarters of the Long Island State Park Commission, and utilized eastbound re-entry to nearby exit 38, which had a north to east loop ramp, and eastbound connecting ramps to and from Sylvan Road, the frontage road along the eastbound lane of the parkway between exits 37 and 39. The interchange between the Southern, Sagtikos, and Heckscher state parkways (exit 41A), was originally intended to be another trumpet interchange, rather than the wye interchange it became.

Despite improvements over time to accommodate modern highway travel, the Southern State Parkway is still considered one of the most dangerous highways in New York, largely due to the numerous sharp curves and hills that hinder visibility for drivers at high speeds. Roughly 4,000 accidents occur on the parkway annually. Specifically, a 13-mile segment of the parkway between exits 17 and 32 has been colloquially nicknamed "Blood Alley" due to several fatal accidents occurring in that stretch over the years.

== Exit list ==
County	Location	mi	km	Exit	Destinations	Notes
Queens–Nassau county line	Cambria Heights–North Valley Stream line	0.00	0.00	12	Belt Parkway west – Brooklyn Cross Island Parkway north – Whitestone Bridge	Western terminus; western terminus of Belt Parkway; southern terminus of Cross Island Parkway
Nassau	North Valley Stream	0.58	0.93	13	Central Avenue / Linden Boulevard – Valley Stream	Signed as exits 13S (south) and 13N (north) eastbound
Nassau	North Valley Stream	1.55	2.49	14	North Fletcher Avenue – Valley Stream, Elmont	No westbound exit; to Valley Stream State Park
Nassau	North Valley Stream	1.90	3.06	15A	Valley Stream State Park	Eastbound exit only; access via Valley Stream State Park Road
Nassau	North Valley Stream	2.23	3.59	15	Corona Avenue to Franklin Avenue	Signed as exits 15S (Corona south) and 15N (Corona north) westbound; no eastbound access to Franklin Avenue
Nassau	Franklin Square	2.50	4.02	16	Franklin Avenue	Westbound exit and eastbound entrance
Nassau	Malverne	3.56	5.73	17	Hempstead Avenue – West Hempstead, Malverne	Signed as exits 17S (south) and 17N (north)
Nassau	Lakeview	4.72	7.60	18	Eagle Avenue	To Hempstead Lake State Park
Nassau	South Hempstead	5.38	8.66	19	Peninsula Boulevard – Hempstead, Rockville Centre	Signed as exits 19S (south) and 19N (north)
Nassau	South Hempstead	6.37	10.25	20	Baldwin Road / Grand Avenue	Signed as exits 20S (south) and 20N (north)
Nassau	Roosevelt	7.55	12.15	21	Nassau Road – Hempstead, Freeport	
Nassau	North Merrick	8.55	13.76	22	Meadowbrook State Parkway – Jones Beach, Mineola	Signed as exits 22S (south) and 22N (north); exits M6E-W on Meadowbrook State Parkway
Nassau	North Merrick	9.06	14.58	23	Meadowbrook Road	
Nassau	North Merrick	9.31	14.98	24	Merrick Avenue – Westbury, Merrick	Signed as exits 24S (south) and 24N (north)
Nassau	North Bellmore	10.60	17.06	25	NY 106 – East Meadow, Bellmore	Signed as exits 25S (south) and 25N (north)
Nassau	North Bellmore	10.90	17.54	26	Bellmore Road	Eastbound exit and entrance
Nassau	North Wantagh	11.77	18.94	27	Wantagh State Parkway – Westbury, Jones Beach	Signed as exits 27S (south) and 27N (north); exits W4E-W on Wantagh State Parkway
Nassau	North Wantagh	12.50	20.12	28S-N	Wantagh Avenue – Levittown, Wantagh	Signed as exits 28S (south) and 28N (north)
Nassau	Wantagh	13.35	21.48	28AS-N	NY 135 – Seaford, Syosset	Signed as exits 28AS (south) and 28AN (north); exits 4E-W on NY 135
Nassau	North Massapequa	13.79	22.19	29	NY 107 (Hicksville Road) – Hicksville, Massapequa	Signed as exits 29S (south) and 29N (north) westbound
Nassau	North Massapequa	14.94	24.04	30	North Broadway – Massapequa, Farmingdale	Signed as exits 30S (south) and 30N (north)
Nassau	North Massapequa	15.38	24.75	31	Bethpage State Parkway north / Linden Street – Massapequa Park, Bethpage State Park	Southern terminus and exit B1 on Bethpage Parkway; no westbound access to Linden Street
Suffolk	North Amityville	16.88	27.17	32	NY 110 – Huntington, Amityville	Signed as exits 32S (south) and 32N (north)
Suffolk	North Lindenhurst	18.30	29.45	33	NY 109 / CR 28 south – Farmingdale, Babylon	Same-directional exit ramps to NY 109; CR 28 not signed; no westbound access to CR 28
Suffolk	North Lindenhurst	18.30	29.45	34	NY 109 east / New Highway (CR 28 south)	No westbound entrance; NY 109 not signed; no eastbound access to NY 109/New Highway
Suffolk	North Lindenhurst	19.03	30.63	35	CR 3 (Wellwood Avenue) – Lindenhurst, Pinelawn	
Suffolk	West Babylon	20.12	32.38	36	CR 2 (Straight Path) – Lindenhurst, Wyandanch	Signed as exits 36S (south) and 36N (north)
Suffolk	West Babylon	21.73	34.97	37	Belmont Avenue (CR 107) – West Babylon	Signed as exits 37S (south) and 37N (north)
Suffolk	North Babylon	22.12	35.60	38	Belmont Lake State Park	Parclo interchange
Suffolk	North Babylon	23.06	37.11	39	NY 231 (Deer Park Avenue) – Deer Park, Babylon	Signed as exits 39S (south) and 39N (north)
Suffolk	West Islip	24.87	40.02	40	Robert Moses Causeway south – Ocean Beaches	Northern terminus of Robert Moses Causeway
Suffolk	West Islip	24.90	40.07	41S-N	CR 57 (Bay Shore Road) – Bay Shore, Deer Park	Signed as exits 41S (south) and 41N (north)
Suffolk	West Islip	25.53	41.09	41A	Sagtikos State Parkway north – Kings Park	Southern terminus of Sagtikos State Parkway
Suffolk	West Islip	25.53	41.09	–	Heckscher State Parkway east – Heckscher Park	Continuation east
1.000 mi = 1.609 km; 1.000 km = 0.621 mi: Incomplete access
