= Seaford Union Free School District =

School district in New York, United States

Address
- 1600 Washington Avenue Seaford, New York, 11783; United States

District information
- Type: Public
- Grades: K–12
- NCES District ID: 3626400

Students and staff
- Students: 2,210
- Teachers: 223.8 (FTE)
- Staff: 220.95 (FTE)
- Student–teacher ratio: 9.87

Other information
- Website: www.seaford.k12.ny.us

Seaford Union Free School District is a public school district based in Seaford, New York in the United States. As of 2025, the school district has 2,210 students enrolled.

The Seaford Union Free School District includes Seaford Manor Elementary, Seaford Harbor Elementary, Seaford Middle School, and Seaford High School.

In 2018, Adele Pecora became the superintendent. She previously worked for the Commack School District and the Island Tree School District.
