= Seaford High School (New York) =

Location
- 1575 Seamans Neck Road; Seaford, New York 11783; United States; 40°41′08″N 73°29′37″W

Information
- Type: Public high school
- Established: 1956
- School district: Seaford Union Free School District
- Principal: Nicole Schnabel
- Faculty: 59.02 FTEs
- Grades: 9–12
- Enrollment: 696 (as of 2018–19)
- Student to teacher ratio: 11.79
- Campus: Suburban/Small Town
- Colours: Green and white
- Mascot: Viking
- Website: seafordhigh.seaford.k12.ny.us

Seaford High School is a public high school located in Seaford, New York, United States, serving students in the ninth through twelfth grades. It is in the Seaford Union Free School District.

As of the 2014–15 school year, the school had an enrollment of 756 students and 61.6 classroom teachers (on an FTE basis), for a student–teacher ratio of 12.3:1. There were 43 students (5.7% of enrollment) eligible for free lunch and 22 (2.9% of students) eligible for reduced-cost lunch.

== General ==
The high school building was constructed in 1956. On November 22, 2002, a memorial was dedicated to five alumni and other victims of the September 11 terrorist attacks.

Students are able to take classes in a variety of subjects (including Advanced Placement courses) and participate in a number of sports.

== Notable alumni ==
- Brent Budowsky — newspaper columnist
- Liberty DeVitto (1971) — drummer for Billy Joel
- Courtney Henggeler (1997) — actress, Cobra Kai
- Pete Koegel — Major League Baseball, player
- Matthew Koma (2005) — musician
- Sean Nolin — Minor League Baseball, pitcher
- Jim Norris — Major League Baseball, outfielder
- Jim Valvano — NCAA basketball coach, North Carolina State University
