= Merrick Road =

Road in New York, United States

- Merrick Boulevard; Floyd H. Flake Boulevard
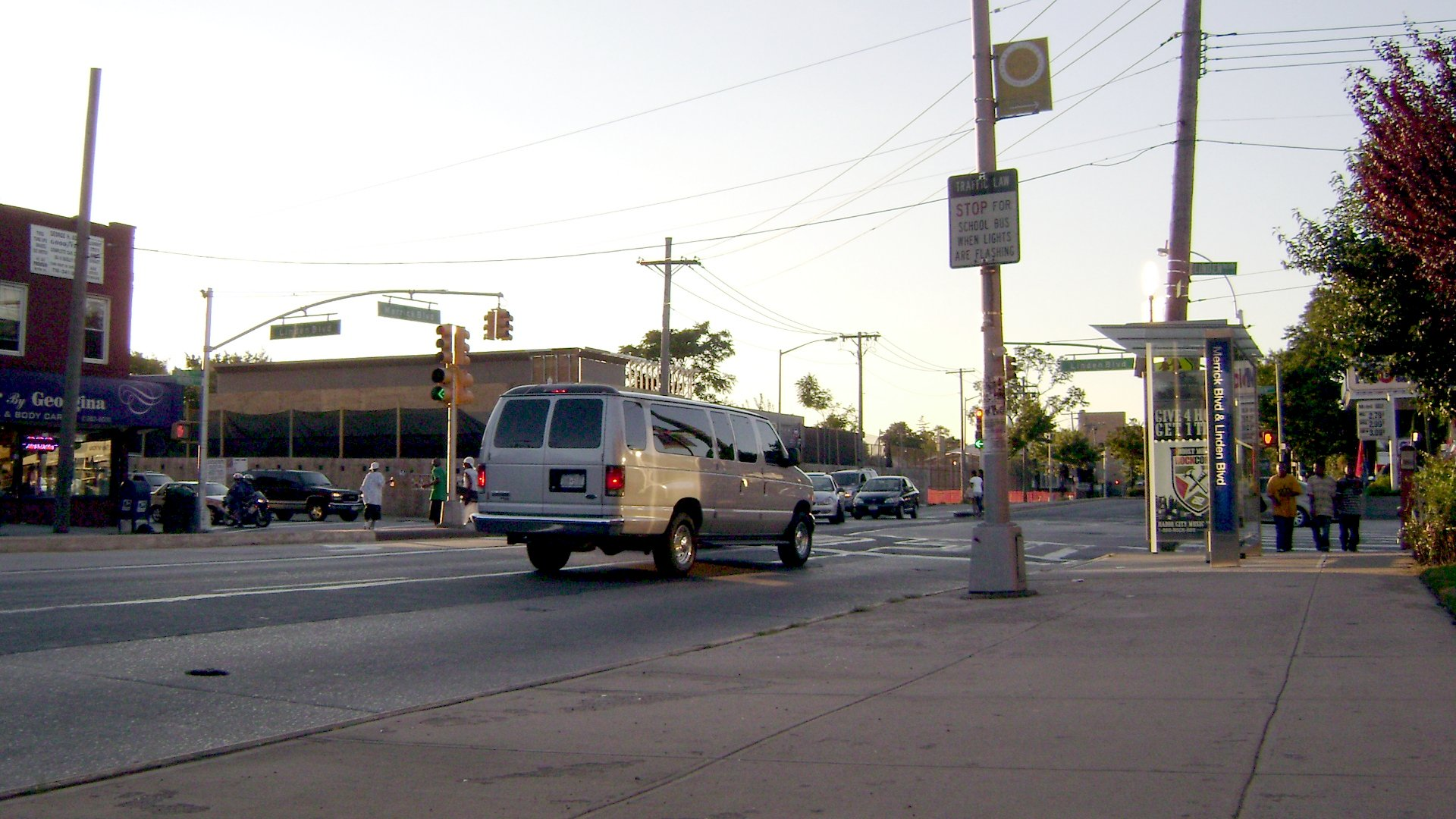
- At Linden Boulevard in Queens
- Namesake: Algonquin word for oyster bed; community leader Floyd H. Flake
- Type: Major surface street
- Maintained by: NYCDOT, Nassau County DPW, NYSDOT
- Length: 21.8 mi (35.1 km)
- Component highways: CR 27 (unsigned) from Rosedale–Valley Stream line to East Massapequa; NY 27A from East Massapequa to Copiague
- Location: Queens, Nassau, and Suffolk Counties
- Nearest metro station: Jamaica Center-Parsons/Archer station
- West end: NY 25 in Jamaica
- Major junctions: Belt Parkway in Laurelton; NY 27 in Rockville Centre; Meadowbrook State Parkway in Freeport; Wantagh State Parkway in Wantagh; NY 135 in Seaford
- East end: NY 27A in Copiague

Merrick Road is an east–west urban arterial in Queens, Nassau, and Suffolk counties in New York, United States. It is known as Merrick Boulevard and co-named as Floyd H. Flake Boulevard in Queens, within New York City.

Merrick Road runs east from the Queens neighborhood of Jamaica through Merrick past the county line between Nassau and Suffolk into Amityville, where it becomes Montauk Highway at the Amityville–Copiague village/hamlet line. The easternmost portion of Merrick Road, from Carman Mill Road to its eastern terminus, is signed as part of New York State Route 27A (NY 27A). At one time, the entire length of Merrick Road east of Baisley Boulevard was signed as NY 27A; currently, the entire portion within Nassau County is currently designated as the unsigned County Route 27 (CR 27). Merrick Road travels along an old right-of-way that was one of the original paths across southern Long Island, stretching from Queens to Montauk Point.

Merrick Road's name comes from the Algonquin word "Meroke", meaning "oyster bed". The section of Merrick Boulevard in Queens was co-named Floyd H. Flake Boulevard in October 2020, in honor of Floyd Flake, senior pastor of the Greater Allen A. M. E. Cathedral of New York in Jamaica.

== Route description ==
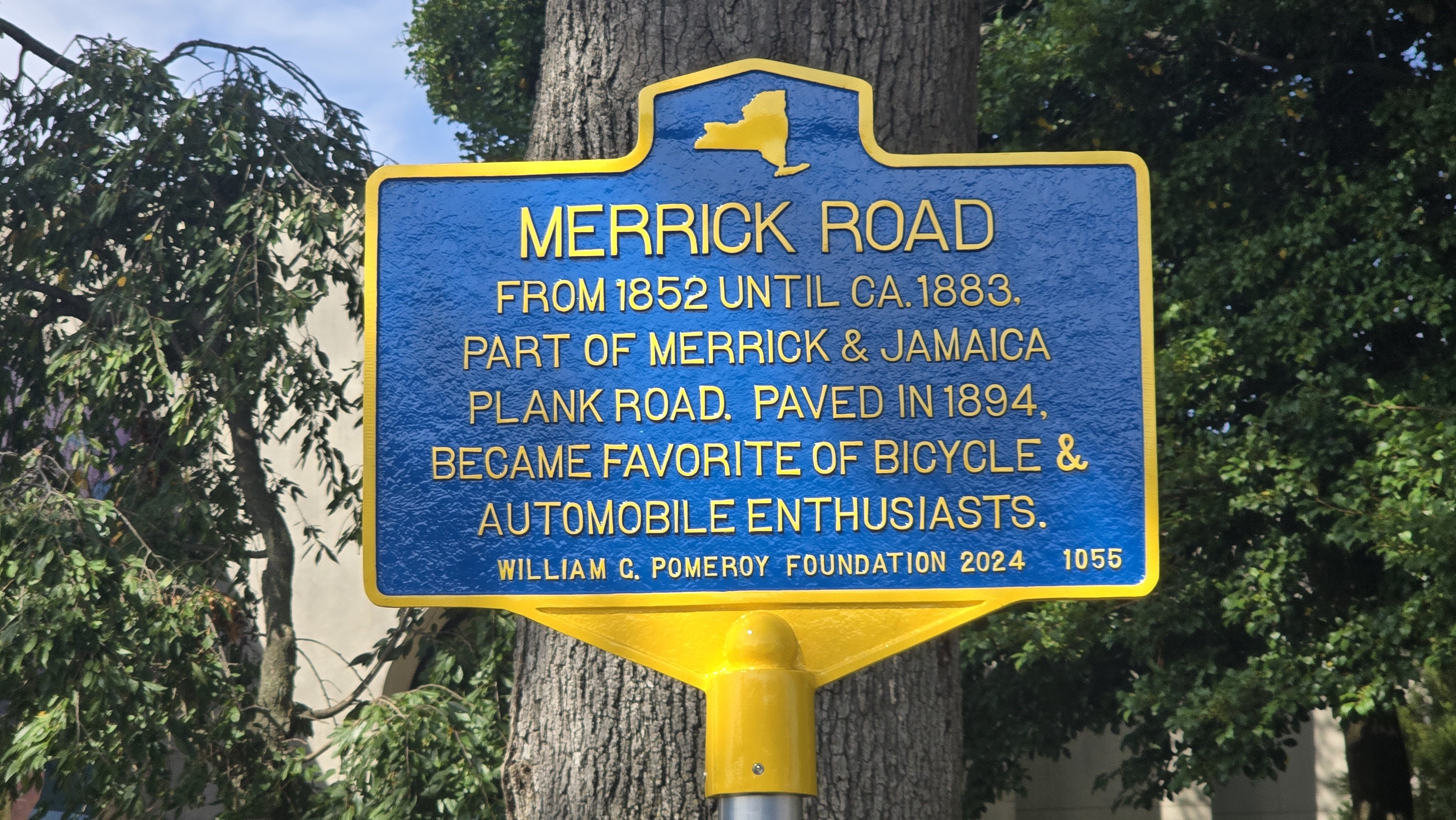
Merrick Road Historic Marker 20240919 135437

Merrick Boulevard begins at NY 25 (Hillside Avenue) as a two-lane, one-way street heading eastbound (compass south at this point), which continues north of Hillside Avenue as 166th Street. Two blocks to the south of Hillside Avenue, Merrick Boulevard passes by the Central Branch of the Queens Library and the 165th Street Bus Terminal. A block to its east, 168th Street provides for westbound traffic. Just south of Liberty Avenue, the two directions join to form a four-lane, divided Merrick Boulevard. Among the parks that the road passes are Proctor-Hopson Circle, St. Albans Park, and Roy Wilkins Park. Merrick Boulevard gradually turns southeast and east, passing through Springfield Gardens, Laurelton and crossing the Belt Parkway before leaving Queens into Nassau County, where it becomes Merrick Road. The section of Merrick Boulevard in Queens was co-named Floyd H. Flake Boulevard in October 2020, in honor of Floyd Flake, senior pastor of the Greater Allen A. M. E. Cathedral of New York in Jamaica.

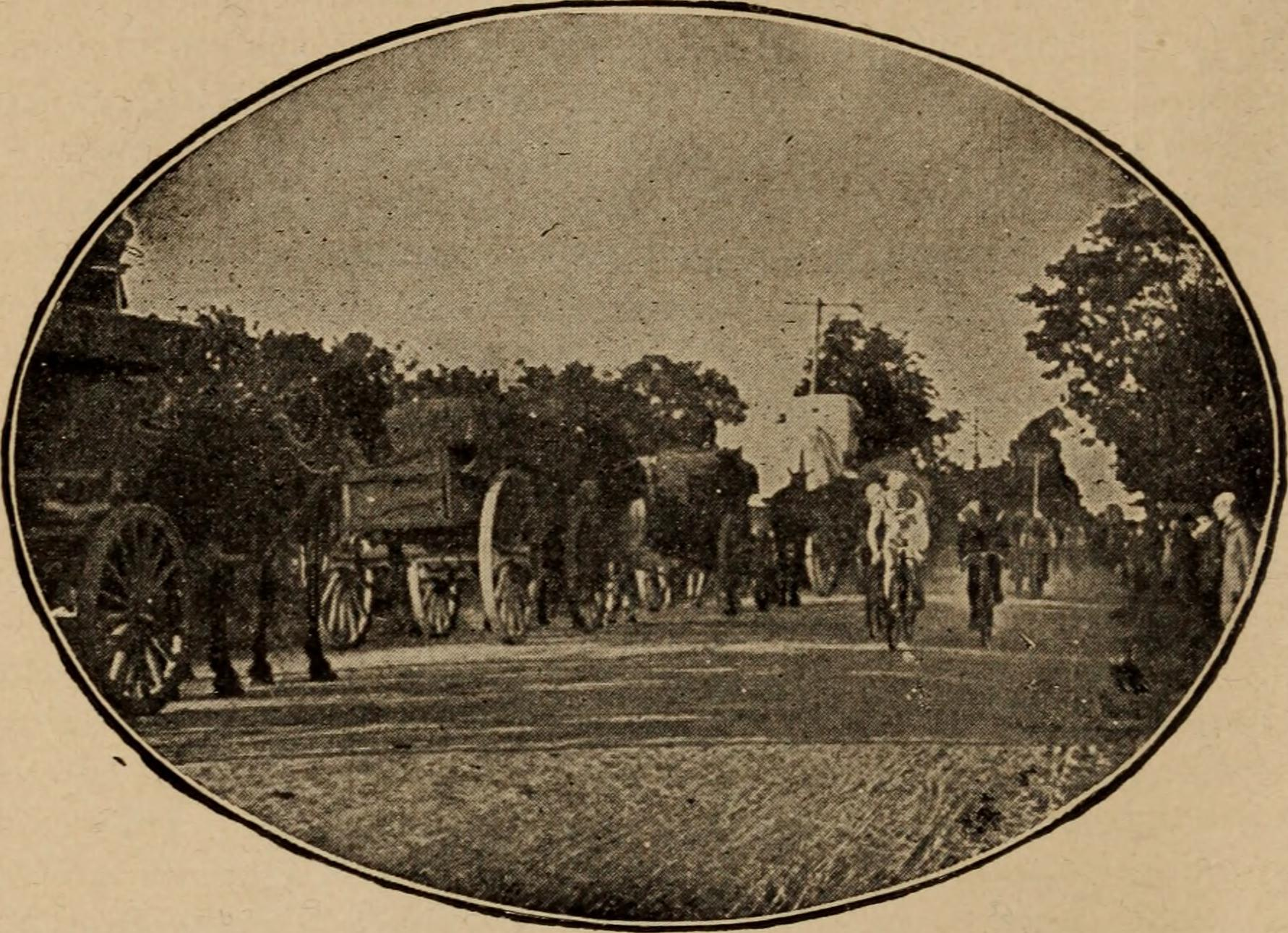
Near Jamaica, 1890s

Merrick Road is one of the old roads along the southern side of Long Island; it has since been replaced by Sunrise Highway (NY 27) for most through traffic. At Rockville Centre, bridges take it over NY 27, with four directional ramps forming a partial interchange. Farther east, it serves as the southern end for state roads such as NY 107, NY 110, and the Seaford–Oyster Bay Expressway (NY 135).

NY 27A begins as a split from NY 27 in East Massapequa, where NY 27 leaves the original Sunrise Gold Circle, which is now Old Sunrise Highway (unsigned NY 900D) east of the split. NY 27A quickly turns south off Old Sunrise Highway onto Carman Mill Road, which ends at Merrick Road. Merrick Road from that point east continues through Massapequa over the Nassau/Suffolk border into Amityville, Suffolk County, where it becomes Montauk Highway at the Amityville/Copiague village/hamlet line. Amityville is the only town in Suffolk County where southernmost major road is known as Merrick Road (it is known as Montauk Highway in every other settlement along the South Shore of Suffolk County.

Both the Meadowbrook State Parkway and the Wantagh State Parkway have interchanges with Merrick Road. A truck needing to make a delivery to the barrier beaches along Ocean Parkway may enter the Meadowbrook southbound at this road and at no point farther north.

== Transportation ==
In Queens, the Q5 and Q87 run on Merrick Boulevard between Archer Avenue and Hook Creek Boulevard, while the Q86 runs on Merrick Boulevard between Archer Avenue and Brookville Boulevard. The Q84, Q85, and Q89 serve Merrick Boulevard between Archer Avenue and Baisley Boulevard, and the Q4 serves it between Archer Avenue and Linden Boulevard. Other routes serving the boulevard include the Q1, Q2, Q3, Q6, Q8, Q9, Q17, Q20, Q36, Q41, Q44, Q76, Q77, QM63, QM65, n1, n6/n6x, n22/n22x, n24, and n26.

The n4/n4x is the main mode of public transportation on Merrick Road in Nassau County, serving it between Jamaica Center Bus Terminal and Freeport LIRR, running closed door service in Queens, with the n19 serving Merrick Road between Freeport LIRR and Unqua Road. A portion of the road is also served by the n1.

== Major intersections ==
County	Location	mi	km	Destinations	Notes
Queens	Jamaica	0.00	0.00	NY 25 (Hillside Avenue)	Western terminus
Queens	Jamaica	0.30	0.48	Jamaica Avenue	
Queens	St. Albans	1.60	2.57	Linden Boulevard	
Queens	St. Albans	3.30	5.31	Springfield Boulevard	
Queens	Laurelton	4.10	6.60	Francis Lewis Boulevard	
Queens	Laurelton	4.40	7.08	Belt Parkway east – Whitestone Bridge	Access via Brookville Boulevard; exit 24B on Belt Parkway
Nassau	Rockville Centre	8.90	14.32	NY 27 (Sunrise Highway)	Interchange; same-directional access only
Nassau	Freeport	13.60	21.89	Meadowbrook State Parkway – Mineola	Exits M9E-W on Meadowbrook State Parkway
Nassau	Wantagh	16.70	26.88	Wantagh State Parkway – Westbury, Jones Beach	Exits W6E-W on Wantagh State Parkway
Nassau	Seaford	17.70	28.49	NY 135 north – Syosset	Southern terminus and exits 1E-W on NY 135
Nassau	Massapequa	18.60	29.93	NY 107 north	Southern terminus of NY 107
Nassau	East Massapequa	21.00	33.80	NY 27A west	Western end of NY 27A concurrency
Suffolk	Amityville			NY 110 north (Broadway)	Southern terminus of NY 110
Suffolk	Amityville	21.80	35.08	NY 27A east (Montauk Highway)	Continuation east; eastern end of NY 27A concurrency; former NY 27
1.000 mi = 1.609 km; 1.000 km = 0.621 mi: Concurrency terminus; Incomplete access

== See also ==
- List of county routes in Nassau County, New York
- Proctor-Hopson Circle
