= North Bellmore, New York =

North Bellmore
- Hamlet and census-designated place
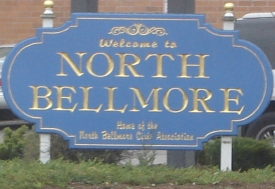
- A welcome sign near an entrance to the hamlet.

- Location in Nassau County and the state of New York

- Location on Long Island Location within the state of New York.
- Coordinates: 40°41′22″N 73°32′16″W
- Country: United States
- State: New York
- County: Nassau
- Town: Hempstead
- Named for: Its location immediately north of Bellmore

Area
  - Total: 2.6 sq mi (6.7 km^{2})
  - Land: 2.6 sq mi (6.7 km^{2})
  - Water: 0 sq mi (0 km^{2})

Population (2010)
  - Total: 19,941
  - Density: 7,700/sq mi (3,000/km^{2})
- Time zone: UTC-5 (Eastern (EST))
  - Summer (DST): UTC-4 (EDT)
- ZIP Codes: 11710 (North Bellmore); 11566 (Merrick); 11793 (Wantagh)
- Area codes: 516, 363

North Bellmore is a census-designated place (CDP) in the Town of Hempstead in Nassau County, on Long Island, in New York, United States. As of the 2020 census, North Bellmore had a population of 20,583.

North Bellmore, along with Bellmore, are referred to collectively as "The Bellmores". Bellmore sits between Merrick to the East and Wantagh to the West. Since Bellmore is on the South Shore, it has direct access to the water.

North Bellmore has an elementary school district consisting of 5 elementary schools. Those schools then funnel into the shared Bellmore-Merrick Central High School District that has 2 middle schools and 3 high schools.

== Demographics ==
=== 2020 census ===
As of the 2020 census, North Bellmore had a population of 20,583. The median age was 42.6 years. 21.1% of residents were under the age of 18 and 18.1% of residents were 65 years of age or older. For every 100 females there were 93.6 males, and for every 100 females age 18 and over there were 91.6 males age 18 and over.

100.0% of residents lived in urban areas, while 0.0% lived in rural areas.

There were 6,723 households in North Bellmore, of which 35.4% had children under the age of 18 living in them. Of all households, 64.4% were married-couple households, 11.4% were households with a male householder and no spouse or partner present, and 20.1% were households with a female householder and no spouse or partner present. About 15.0% of all households were made up of individuals and 9.0% had someone living alone who was 65 years of age or older.

There were 6,866 housing units, of which 2.1% were vacant. The homeowner vacancy rate was 0.5% and the rental vacancy rate was 2.7%.

Racial composition as of the 2020 census
Race	Number	Percent
White	16,059	78.0%
Black or African American	675	3.3%
American Indian and Alaska Native	38	0.2%
Asian	1,484	7.2%
Native Hawaiian and Other Pacific Islander	3	0.0%
Some other race	763	3.7%
Two or more races	1,561	7.6%
Hispanic or Latino (of any race)	2,374	11.5%

=== 2010 census ===
As of the census of 2010, there were 19,949 people, 6,365 households, and 5,407 families residing within the CDP. The population density was 7,696.6 inhabitants per square mile (2,971.7/km^{2}). There were 6,818 housing units at an average density of 2,542.9 per square mile (981.8/km^{2}). The racial makeup of the CDP was 88.5% White, 2.6% African American, 0.1% Native American, 5.6% Asian, 0% Pacific Islander, 1.55% from other races, and 1.7% from two or more races. Hispanic or Latino of any race were 7.72% of the population.

There were 6,555 households, out of which 39.0% had children under the age of 18 living with them, 68.9% were married couples living together, 10.7% had a female householder with no husband present, and 18.7% were non-families. 16.2% of all households were made up of individuals, and 8.2% had someone living alone who was 65 years of age or older. The average household size was 3.08 and the average family size was 3.46. Median value of owner-occupied housing units 2007–2011 was $451,900.

The age of the population varies with 29.1% under the age of 18, 6.5% from 18 to 24, 29.8% from 25 to 44, 23.6% from 45 to 64, and 14.3% who were 65 years of age or older. The median age was 39 years. For every 100 females, there were 94.4 males. For every 100 females age 18 and over, there were 91.1 males.

The median income for a household in the CDP was $102,973, and the median income for a family was $113,521. Males had a median income of $60,832 versus $32,106 for females. The per capita income for the CDP was $38,314. About 1.6% of families and 4.6% of the population were below the poverty line, including 2.6% of those under age 18 and 4.2% of those age 65 or over.

== Emergency services ==
North Bellmore is served by 2 North Bellmore Fire Department Houses and the Nassau County Police Department.

== Notable residents ==
- Lenny Bruce, progressive comedian.
- Paul S. Katz, graduate of Mepham High School, public intellectual and renowned neuroscientist. Noted as the scourge to Georgia intelligent-design advocates.
- Tatyana Ali, graduate of Saw Mill Road School and briefly attended Grand Avenue Junior High (now Grand Avenue Middle School). Actor and singer who starred in the televised show The Fresh Prince of Bel-Air. Was in the creative arts program.
- Amos Zereoue, graduate of Mepham High School, Pittsburgh Steelers running back.
- Eric Chester

== See also ==
- Bellmore, New York
- North Merrick, New York
