= Seaford, New York =

- Hamlet and census-designated place
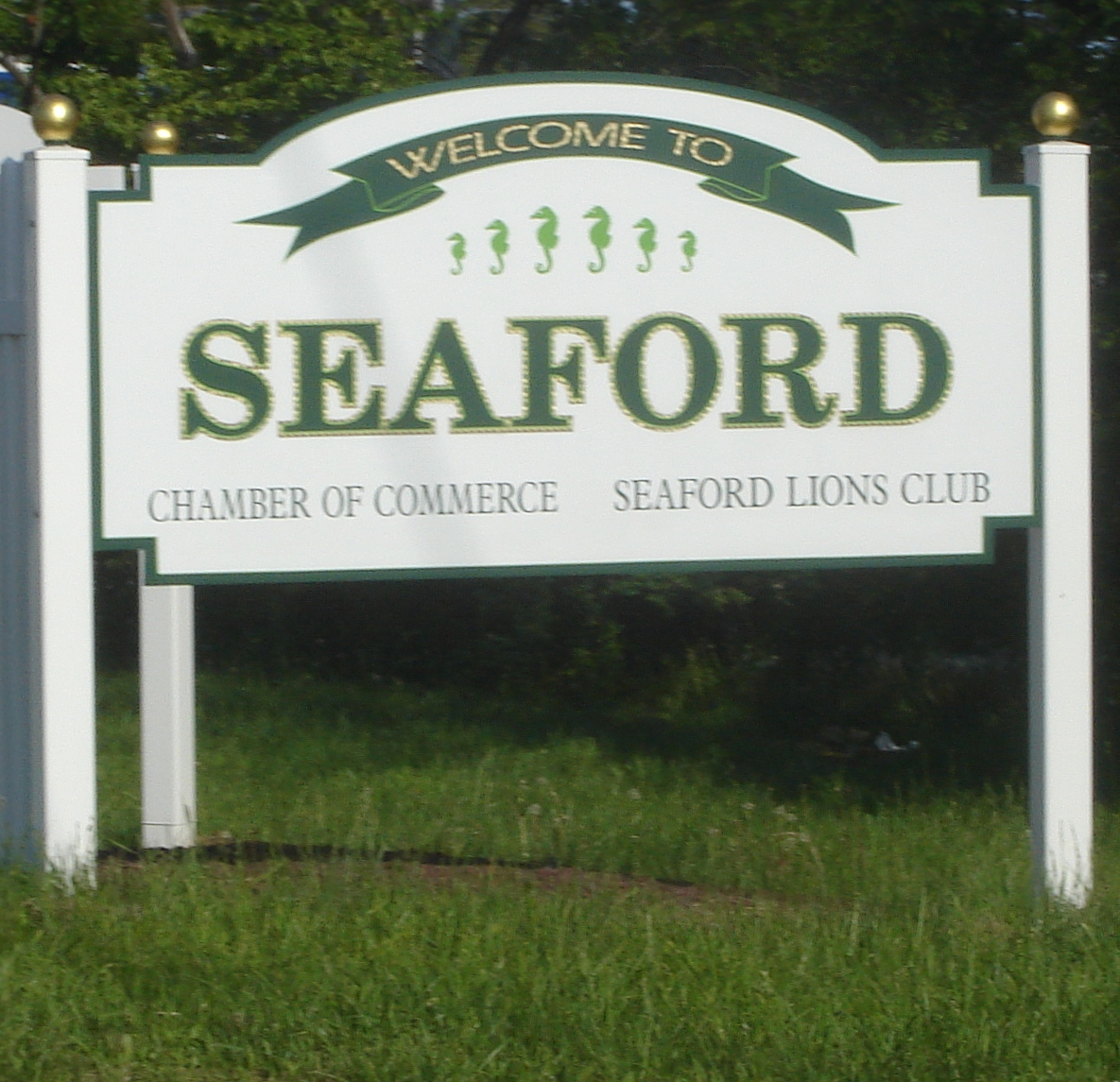
- A Seaford welcome sign

- Location in Nassau County and the state of New York

- Location on Long Island Location within the state of New York
- Coordinates: 40°40′7″N 73°29′33″W
- Country: United States
- State: New York
- County: Nassau
- Town: Hempstead
- Named for: Seaford, East Sussex

Area
  - Total: 2.66 sq mi (6.90 km^{2})
  - Land: 2.61 sq mi (6.76 km^{2})
  - Water: 0.058 sq mi (0.15 km^{2})
- Elevation: 9.8 ft (3 m)

Population (2020)
  - Total: 15,251
  - Density: 5,843.8/sq mi (2,256.31/km^{2})
- Time zone: UTC-5 (Eastern (EST))
  - Summer (DST): UTC-4 (EDT)
- ZIP Code: 11783
- Area codes: 516, 363
- FIPS code: 36-66058
- GNIS feature ID: 0964724

Seaford is a census-designated place in the town of Hempstead, Nassau County, on the South Shore of Long Island, in New York, United States. The population was 15,251 at the 2020 census.

== Geography ==
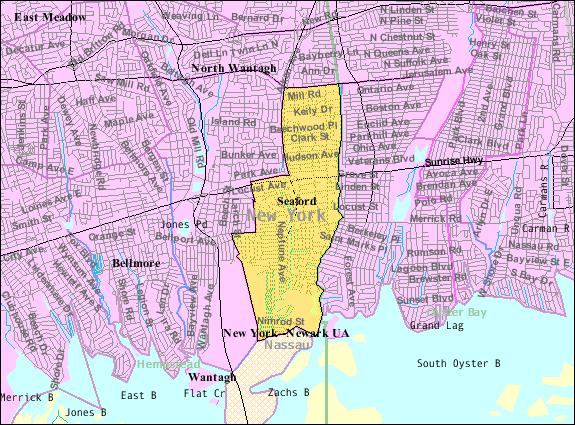
U.S. Census map of Seaford.

According to the United States Census Bureau, the CDP has a total area of 2.6 square miles (6.7 km^{2}), of which 2.6 square miles (6.7 km^{2}) is land and 0.38% is water.

== History ==
The original settlers of Seaford were the Marsapeaques, a Native American Indian tribe. They called the area "Great Water Land."

European settlement began with the arrival of Captain John Seaman, a native of Seaford, East Sussex, in England. After obtaining the patent for the area, Seaman oversaw the creation of Jerusalem South, the first European name given to the community which was to become Seaford. It was also widely referred to as Seaman's Neck.

During the 19th century, as villages across Long Island started to grow (due to the creation of the Long Island Rail Road), Jerusalem South seemed to be unaffected. In 1868 the community was renamed to "Seaford", in honor of Captain Seaman's hometown in England. During this time, Seaford remained an agricultural area. Over time, Seaford gained a post office, a church, and a one-room school, established in what would many years later become the first fire house and, as of 1976, the Seaford Historical Museum.

With the creation of Sunrise Highway in 1929, Seaford started to see a large influx of inhabitants. Before 1929, Seaford had approximately 1,200 citizens. Within 25 years, this number would triple.

=== Economy ===
Cash crops such as corn and wheat were some of the earliest farmed within the Seaford area. Due to easy access to various waterfronts, the attempts to fish and recover oysters were widely seen. At first, this was a hard task considering the layers of land beneath the water. In the mid-19th century, baymen from the Seaford area created a type of small, round-bottomed boat called the "Seaford skiff" that was used for fishing and market gunning (commercial waterfowl hunting).

With the popularity of hunting and fishing came the development of two hotels along Merrick Road: the Sportsman's Hotel, where Verity Van Lines is now located near Route 135, and the Powell Hotel at Jackson Avenue. Many celebrities came to these hotels to go duck hunting in South Oyster Bay, including New York Yankees Babe Ruth and Lou Gehrig, as well as brewery and longtime Yankees owner Jacob Ruppert.

== Demographics ==
Historical population
Census	Pop.	Note	%±
2000	15,791		—
2010	15,294		−3.1%
2020	15,251		−0.3%
U.S. decennial census

=== 2020 census ===
As of the 2020 census, Seaford had a population of 15,251. The median age was 43.6 years. 20.3% of residents were under the age of 18 and 19.3% of residents were 65 years of age or older. For every 100 females there were 94.6 males, and for every 100 females age 18 and over there were 91.4 males age 18 and over.

100.0% of residents lived in urban areas, while 0.0% lived in rural areas.

There were 5,293 households in Seaford, of which 32.8% had children under the age of 18 living in them. Of all households, 64.2% were married-couple households, 11.0% were households with a male householder and no spouse or partner present, and 20.9% were households with a female householder and no spouse or partner present. About 16.9% of all households were made up of individuals and 10.2% had someone living alone who was 65 years of age or older.

There were 5,475 housing units, of which 3.3% were vacant. The homeowner vacancy rate was 0.7% and the rental vacancy rate was 4.9%.

Racial composition as of the 2020 census
Race	Number	Percent
White	13,383	87.8%
Black or African American	116	0.8%
American Indian and Alaska Native	17	0.1%
Asian	428	2.8%
Native Hawaiian and Other Pacific Islander	1	0.0%
Some other race	300	2.0%
Two or more races	1,006	6.6%
Hispanic or Latino (of any race)	1,239	8.1%

=== 2000 census ===
As of the census of 2000, there were 15,791 people, 5,257 households, and 4,200 families residing in the CDP. The population density was 6,072.9 inhabitants per square mile (2,344.8/km^{2}). There were 5,358 housing units at an average density of 2,060.6 per square mile (795.6/km^{2}). The racial makeup of the CDP was 99.8% white, .15% African American, .06% Native American, .68% Asian, .02% Pacific Islander, .54% from other races, and .59% from two or more races. Hispanic or Latino people of any race were 1.71% of the population.

There were 5,257 households, out of which 37.2% had children under the age of 18 living with them, 68.4% were married couples living together, 8.6% had a female householder with no husband present, and 20.1% were non-families. 16.3% of all households were made up of individuals, and 8.3% had someone living alone who was 65 years of age or older. The average household size was 3.00 and the average family size was 3.38.

In the CDP, the population was spread out, with 25.2% under the age of 18, 6.9% from 18 to 24, 30.2% from 25 to 44, 23.9% from 45 to 64, and 13.7% who were 65 years of age or older. The median age was 38 years. For every 100 females, there were 95.5 males. For every 100 females age 18 and older, there were 93 males.

The median income for a household in the CDP was $78,572, and the median income for a family was $85,751. Males had a median income of $60,092 versus $39,083 for females. The per capita income for the CDP was $29,244. About 2.8% of families and 3.6% of the population were below the poverty line, including 2.9% of those under age 18 and 3.9% of those age 65 or over.

== Parks and recreation ==
Seaford contains three Nassau County-owned parks:

- Cedar Creek Park
- Tackapausha Preserve
- Washington Avenue Park

Additionally, the Town of Hempstead owns and maintains three parks of its own within Seaford:

- Aron Drive Park
- Estella Park
- Seaman's Neck Park

=== Sports ===
Seaford is home to the Long Island Broncos. Established in 1966, the Long Island Broncos is one of the oldest Youth Football and Cheer organizations on Long Island.

Seaford also has Police Athletic Leagues for several sports, and the local Roman Catholic parish, St. William the Abbot, offers Catholic Youth Organization (CYO) basketball and swimming. Maria Regina also offers a wide variety of CYO sports and the Seaford Little League offers both baseball and softball.

== Education ==
=== Schools ===
The Seaford Union Free School District is the public school district that encompasses the Seaford Harbor Elementary School (K-5), Seaford Manor Elementary School (K-5), Seaford Middle School (6-8), and Seaford High School (9–12). Seaford is home to two Catholic schools: Saint William the Abbot Catholic School (nursery-8th), founded by the Ursuline Sisters in 1954, and Maria Regina School.

The Seaford Free Union School District contains a board of education and a central administration that oversee the entire school district and are charged with decision making. The board is headed by President Lisa Herbert, and Vice President Angela Parisi. The central administration deals with education matters and budgeting, led by Superintendent Dr. Adele Pecora and assistant superintendents Dr. Sheena Jacob, Amanda Barney, and Richard Cunningham.

Seaford High School's subjects include art, business, computer sciences, English, health, French, Spanish, American Sign Language, mathematics, music & choral studies, physical education & health, science, and social studies. Within most of these subjects, AP courses are available.

As of 2010, there were 3,296 students attending all public schools in Seaford, and 984 in private schools.

The school has a total enrollment of 786 students and is equipped with 62 full-time teachers. The current principal of Seaford High School is Scott Bersin. Vice principals are Anthony Alison and Jessica Sventeroitis.

The Manor and Harbor elementary schools do not offer school-affiliated sports, but do have some clubs and an after-school SCOPE program for students. Seaford Middle School offers many school-sponsored sports, including wrestling, volleyball, softball, baseball, lacrosse, and basketball. The middle school also offers a drama program that produces a musical once a year for the community. Seaford High School offers many of the same sports as middle school, but at the varsity and junior varsity levels. Additionally, the high school offers many clubs and extracurriculars.

Parts of Seaford are also covered by the Island Trees, Plainedge, and Levittown school districts, where all students north of Jerusalem Avenue attend school.

=== Seaford Public Library ===
The Seaford Public Library is run by a board of trustees that oversees how the library is interacting with the community. As of 2026, the board is headed by President John Scaparro, and Vice President Peter Ruffner.

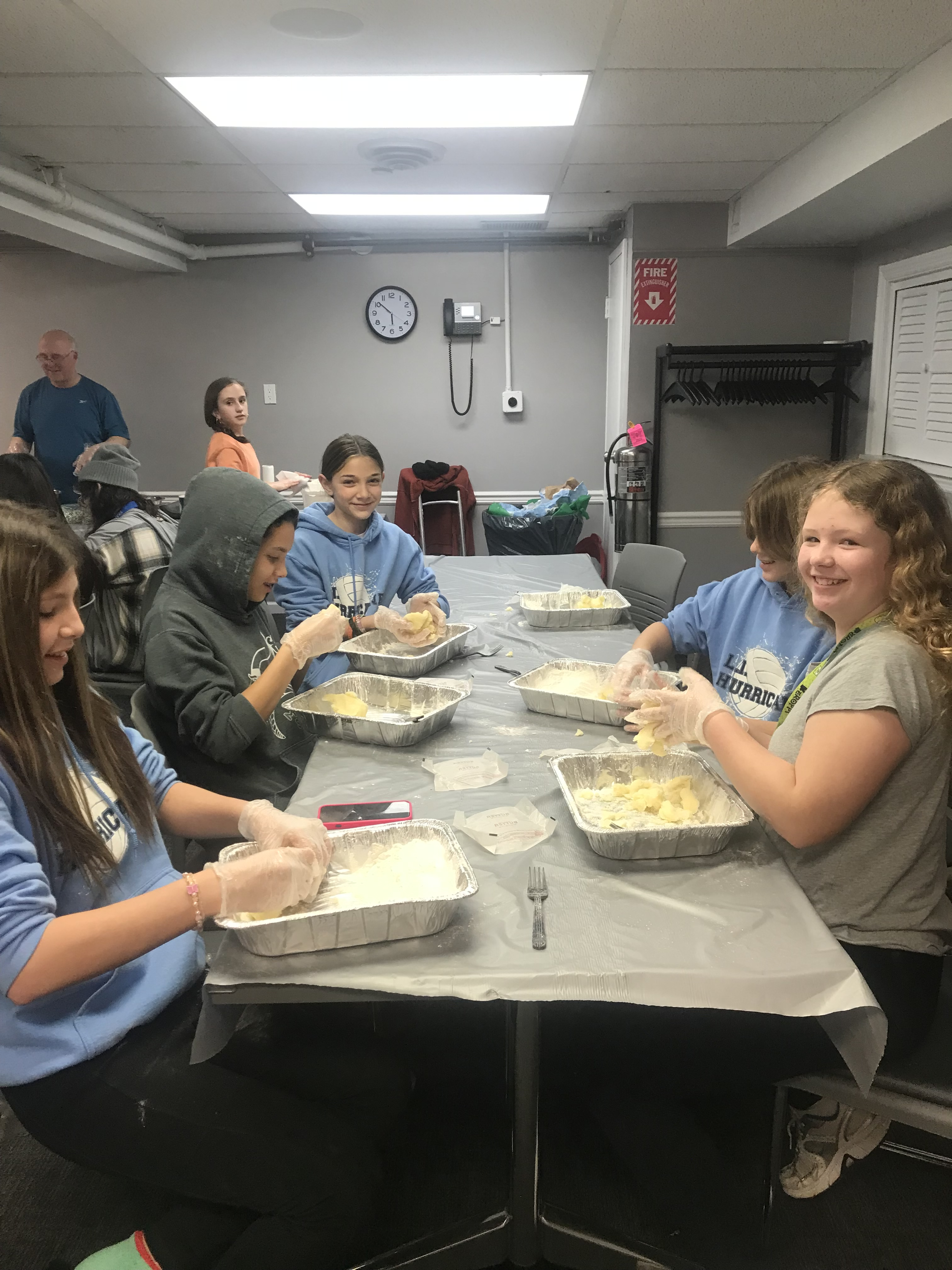
The teen program at the Seaford Public Library making sugar cookies.

The library requires a membership to be able to use the library's resources. Membership is free and valid for up to three years. Members can take out books any day of the week except for Sunday. The library also has movies, documentaries, and magazines available for borrowing.

In addition, the library creates many events for both adults and children. Events for children include crafts, scavenger hunts, and book clubs. One event that takes place in the library is reading to dogs. The library is able to bring in reading/therapy dogs for the kids to read to them. Another program of the library is to rent out items to the children. The library has a telescope program that allows members to borrow a telescope from the library for a week and then return it. The adults have opportunities to be a part of book discussions and other community events.

== Transportation ==
Seaford has a station on the Babylon Branch of the Long Island Rail Road.

Nassau Inter-County Express service in Seaford is provided by the n54 (which serves Jerusalem and Washington Avenues, and the train station) and the n19 (which runs along Merrick Road, south of the station).

== Notable people ==
- Karol J. Bobko, NASA astronaut and the first person to fly on 3 different Space Shuttle missions. Bobko was pilot of the maiden voyage of the Challenger (mission STS-6) in April 1983, commander of the 4th voyage of the Discovery (mission STS-51-D) in April 1985, and commander of the maiden voyage of the Atlantis (mission STS-51-J) in October 1985. Moved to Seaford at age 13.
- Liberty DeVitto, best known as the drummer for Billy Joel; has also played with the NYC Hit Squad
- Courtney Henggeler, actress, Cobra Kai
- Al Iaquinta, real-estate agent and UFC fighter
- Jesse Kinch, singer, songwriter, musician
- Peter T. King, representative for New York's 2nd Congressional District
- Matthew Koma, singer, songwriter, musician
- Sean Nolin, Washington Nationals pitcher
- Eric Tuchman, Emmy Award-winning producer and screenwriter, The Handmaid's Tale
- Jim Valvano, head men's basketball coach at North Carolina State University, winners of the 1983 NCAA tournament
