= Harold Walker Memorial Park =

Park in Lakeview, New York, United States

- Interactive map of Harold Walker Memorial Park
- Type: Public
- Location: Lakeview, New York
- Coordinates: 40°40′28″N 73°39′8″W
- Owner: Town of Hempstead
- Website: hempsteadny.gov/facilities/facility/details/Harold-Walker-Memorial-Park-60

Harold Walker Memorial Park is a public park located within the hamlet of Lakeview, in Nassau County, New York, United States.

== Overview ==
Located on Woodfield Road in the hamlet of Lakeview, Harold Walker Memorial Park is owned and maintained by the Town of Hempstead. It consists of an outdoor swimming facility with multiple pools, a playground, picnic areas, seating areas, and sports facilities.

Harold Walker Park is also a common gathering place for local civic groups, and is one of the primary civic hubs within Lakeview. It is also the site of many of Lakeview's holiday celebrations – including its annual Christmas tree lighting ceremony.

The park is named in honor of Harold Walker – a late local resident of the Lakeview community.

In 2025, construction commenced on a major park modernization project.

== See also ==
- Hempstead Lake State Park
- Norman J. Levy Park and Preserve
