= Hempstead, New York =

Town on Long Island, New York, United States

- Town
- Town of Hempstead
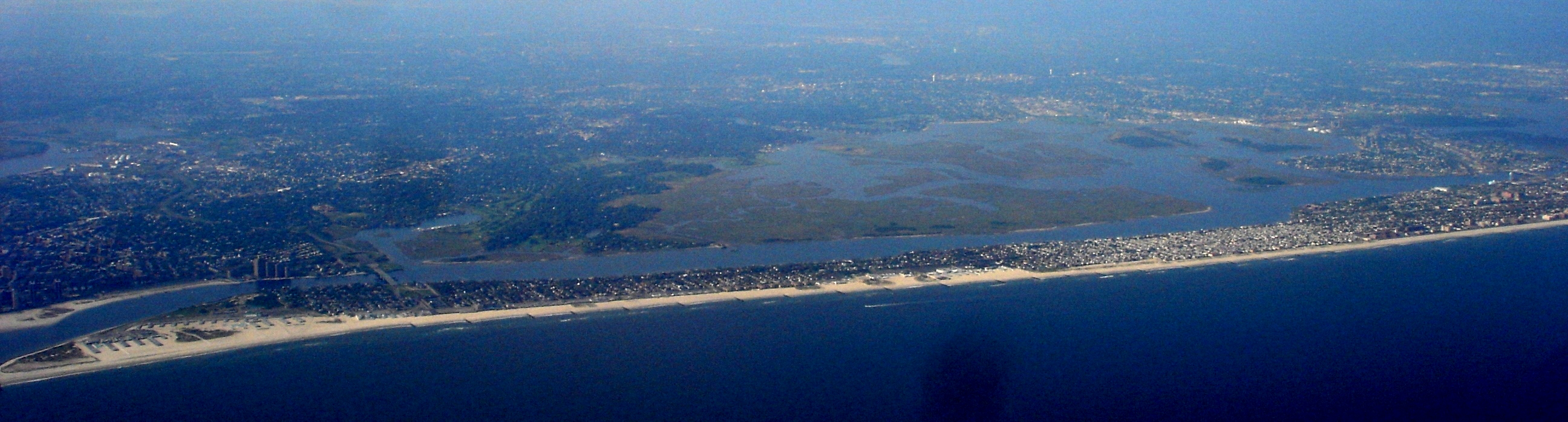
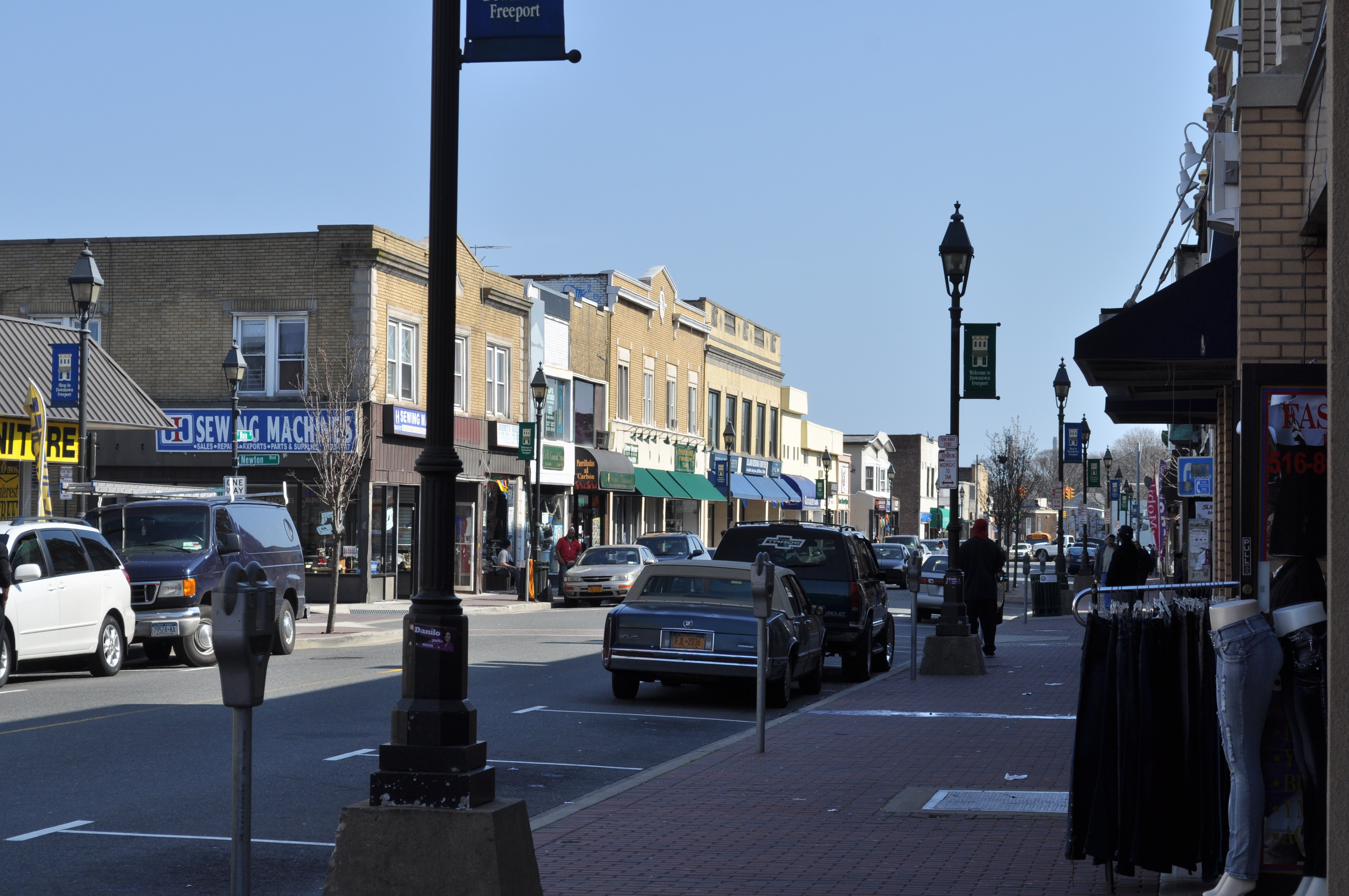
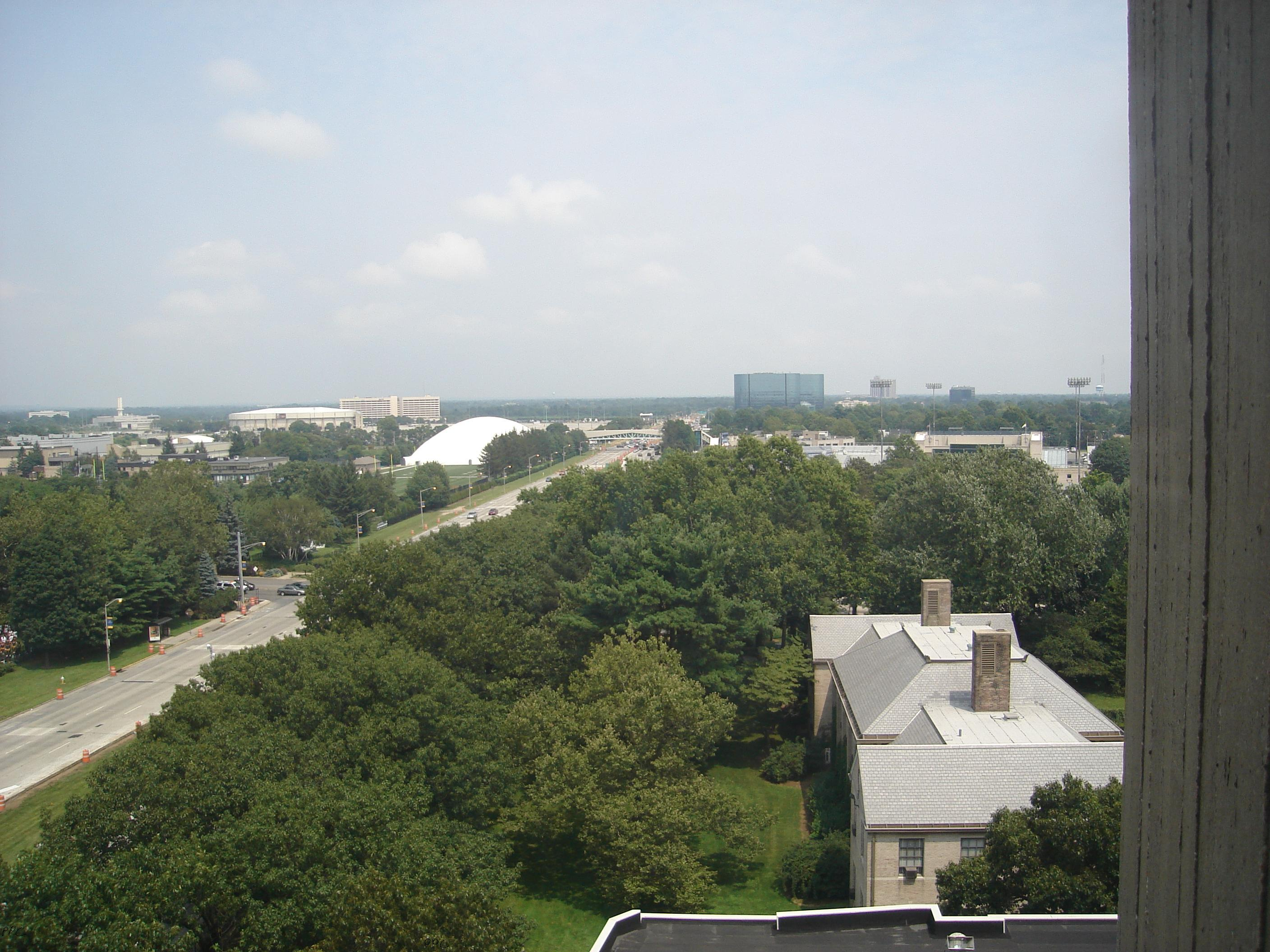
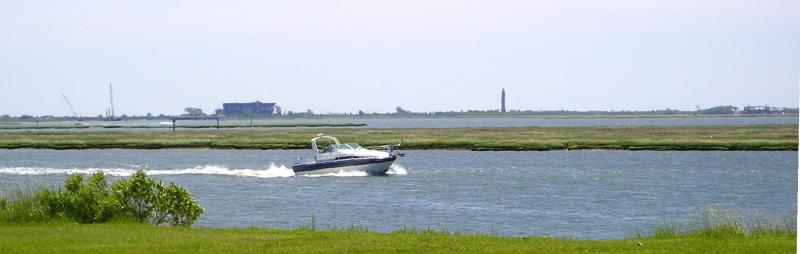
- Atlantic Beach view, downtown Freeport, Uniondale skyline, Wantagh Park

- Flag
- Nickname: ToH
- Interactive map of Hempstead, New York
- Coordinates: 40°42′17″N 73°37′02″W
- Country: United States
- State: New York
- County: Nassau
- First settled: 1644; 382 years ago
- Town Seat: Hempstead

Government
  - Type: Town council
  - Town supervisor: Joe Scianablo (D)
  - Town council: Members: • D1: Dorothy L. Goosby (D); • D2: Thomas E. Muscarella (R); • D3: Melissa Miller (R); • D4: Laura Ryder (R); • D5: Christopher Schneider (R); • D6: Dennis Dunne Sr. (R)

Area
  - Total: 191.77 sq mi (496.68 km^{2})
  - Land: 118.68 sq mi (307.39 km^{2})
  - Water: 73.09 sq mi (189.29 km^{2}) 38.11%

Population (2020)
  - Total: 793,409
  - Rank: 2nd in New York
  - Density: 6,685/sq mi (2,581/km^{2})
- Time zone: UTC-5 (EST)
  - Summer (DST): UTC-4 (EDT)
- ZIP code: 11550
- Area codes: 516, 363
- FIPS code: 36-059-34000
- Website: hempsteadny.gov

Hempstead is the most populous town in the state of New York. It is the largest of the three towns within Nassau County (alongside North Hempstead and Oyster Bay), located on Long Island, immediately east of southern Queens. The population was 793,409 at the time of the 2020 United States census, and its highest decennial census count ever was back in the 1970 United States census, where the town recorded a population of 801,592, which also made it the ninth largest municipality in the country by population at that time.

The town occupies the southwestern part of Nassau County, on western Long Island. A total of 22 incorporated villages (one of which is named Hempstead) are completely or partially within the town.

The campuses for Adelphi University and Hofstra University are both located in Hempstead.

== History ==
The town was first settled around 1644 following the establishment of a treaty between English colonists, John Carman and Robert Fordham, and the Lenape Indians in 1643. Although the settlers were from the new English colony of New Haven (established in 1638), later incorporated into Connecticut (1662), a patent was issued by the government of New Netherland after the settlers had purchased land from the local natives. This transaction is depicted in a mural in the Hempstead Village Hall, reproduced from a poster commemorating the 300th anniversary of Hempstead Village.

In local Dutch-language documents of the 1640s and later, the town was invariably called Heemstede, and several of Hempstead's original 50 patentees were Dutch, suggesting that Hempstead was named after the Dutch town and/or castle of the same name, both of which are located near the cities of Haarlem and Amsterdam. However, the authorities possibly had Dutchified a name given by co-founder John Carman, who was born in 1606 in Hemel Hempstead, Hertfordshire, England, on land owned by his ancestors since the 13th century.

In 1664, the settlement under the new Province of New York adopted the Duke's Laws, austere statutes that became the basis upon which the laws of many colonies were to be founded. For a time, Hempstead became known as "Old Blue", as a result of the "Blue Laws". The Census of slaves, conducted in the Province of New York in 1755, lists more than 100 enslaved individuals in Hempstead.

During the American Revolution, the Loyalists in the south and the American sympathizers in the north caused a split in 1784 into "North Hempstead" and "South Hempstead". South Hempstead was renamed to Hempstead in 1796.

Richard Hewlett, who was born in Hempstead, served as a Lieutenant Colonel with the British Army under General Oliver De Lancey in the American Revolution. Afterwards, Hewlett departed the United States with other Loyalists and settled in the newly created Province of New Brunswick in what later became Canada. A settlement there was named Hampstead, in Queen's County next to Long Island in the Saint John River.

With the 1898 incorporation of the Borough of Queens as part of the City of Greater New York, and the 1899 split of Queens County to create Nassau County, some southwestern portions of the Town of Hempstead – namely, the Rockaway Peninsula west of (and including) the former Village of Far Rockaway – seceded from the town and became part of the Borough of Queens.

In 1945, the Town of Hempstead conveyed 165 acres (67 ha) of its territory to Queens, in turn shifting a southern portion of the New York City–Nassau County border slightly east, from the northern coast of the Head of Bay of Jamaica Bay and land border near the eastern coast of Bayswater into the middle of the Head of Bay and Mott Basin. This adjustment was made so as to both straighten the boundary line and to ensure that the entirety of the proposed New York International Airport (since renamed as John F. Kennedy International Airport) would be located within New York City. This boundary change was ultimately effectuated on April 20, 1945.

== Geography ==
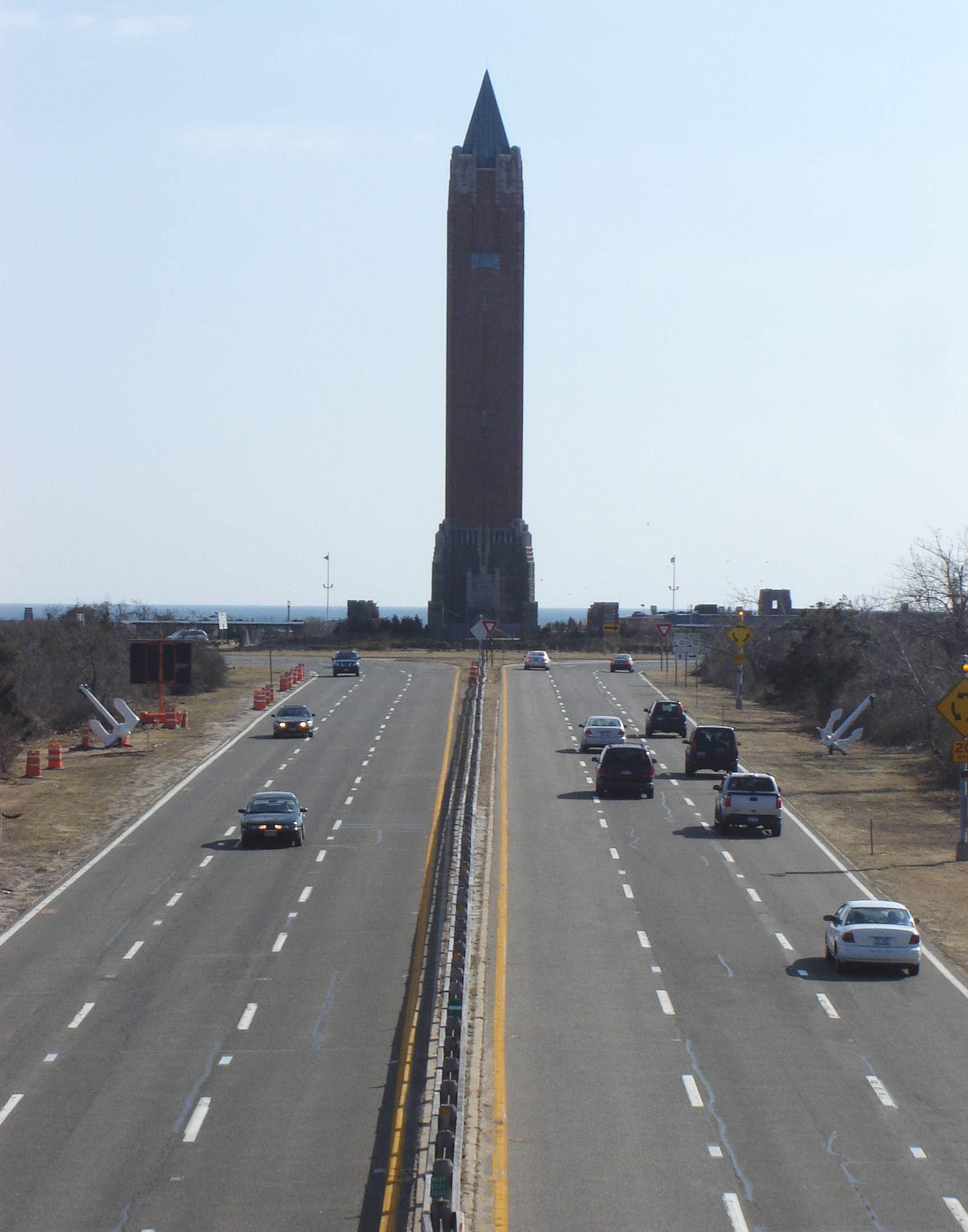
The water tower at Jones Beach State Park centered over the Wantagh Parkway

According to the United States Census Bureau, the town has a total area of 191.3 square miles (495.5 km^{2}), of which 120.0 square miles (310.7 km^{2}) is land and 71.4 square miles (184.8 km^{2}) – or 37.30% – is water.

The western town line is Nassau County's border with Queens County in New York City. Its northern border, with the Town of North Hempstead and the town of Oyster Bay, is along the Main Line of the Long Island Rail Road and along Old Country Road in Garden City heading east towards the Wantagh Parkway. Its eastern border, also with the town of Oyster Bay, runs parallel to (and several hundred feet west of) Route 107. To the south is the Atlantic Ocean, off of Atlantic Beach, Lido Beach, Point Lookout, and Jones Beach, as well as the city of Long Beach.

The most popular beach on the east coast of the United States, Jones Beach State Park, is located in Hempstead. The beach is a popular destination for Long Islanders and residents of New York. The beach itself receives approximately six million visitors per year.

=== Communities ===
The town of Hempstead contains 22 villages and 38 hamlets:

==== Villages ====
- Atlantic Beach
- Bellerose
- Cedarhurst
- East Rockaway
- Floral Park (small part in North Hempstead)
- Freeport
- Garden City (small part in North Hempstead)
- Hempstead (village)
- Hewlett Bay Park
- Hewlett Harbor
- Hewlett Neck
- Island Park
- Lawrence
- Lynbrook
- Malverne
- Mineola (almost all in North Hempstead)
- New Hyde Park (part; northern half in North Hempstead)
- Rockville Centre
- South Floral Park
- Stewart Manor
- Valley Stream
- Woodsburgh

==== Hamlets ====
- Baldwin
- Baldwin Harbor
- Barnum Island
- Bay Park
- Bellerose Terrace
- Bellmore
- Bethpage (almost all in Oyster Bay)
- East Atlantic Beach
- East Garden City
- East Meadow
- Elmont
- Franklin Square
- Garden City South
- Harbor Isle
- Hewlett
- Inwood
- Lakeview
- Levittown
- Lido Beach
- Malverne Park Oaks
- Merrick
- Munson
- North Bellmore
- North Lynbrook
- North Merrick
- North Valley Stream
- North Wantagh
- North Woodmere
- Oceanside
- Point Lookout
- Roosevelt
- Salisbury (South Westbury)
- Seaford
- South Hempstead
- South Valley Stream
- Uniondale
- Wantagh
- West Hempstead
- Woodmere

In addition, there are a few areas that are not part of any incorporated village or census-designated place:

- Jones Beach Island and nearby uninhabited islands in South Oyster Bay
- A small area between Lynbrook and Rockville Centre that contains only Rockville Cemetery

== Demographics ==
Historical population
Census	Pop.	Note	%±
1790	3,828		—
1800	4,141		8.2%
1810	5,084		22.8%
1830	6,215		—
1840	7,609		22.4%
1850	8,811		15.8%
1860	12,376		40.5%
1870	13,999		13.1%
1880	18,164		29.8%
1890	23,756		30.8%
1900	27,066		13.9%
1910	44,297		63.7%
1920	70,790		59.8%
1930	186,735		163.8%
1940	259,318		38.9%
1950	432,506		66.8%
1960	740,738		71.3%
1970	801,592		8.2%
1980	738,517		−7.9%
1990	725,639		−1.7%
2000	755,924		4.2%
2010	759,757		0.5%
2020	793,409		4.4%
U.S. Decennial Census

=== Race and ethnic composition ===
Hempstead town, New York – Racial and ethnic composition Note: the US Census treats Hispanic/Latino as an ethnic category. This table excludes Latinos from the racial categories and assigns them to a separate category. Hispanics/Latinos may be of any race.
Race / Ethnicity (NH = Non-Hispanic)	Pop 1980	Pop 1990	Pop 2000	Pop 2010	Pop 2020	% 1980	% 1990	% 2000	% 2010	% 2020
White alone (NH)	637,755	575,755	521,352	454,883	402,466	86.36%	79.34%	68.97%	59.87%	50.73%
Black or African American alone (NH)	66,824	83,268	107,929	119,480	125,839	9.05%	11.48%	14.28%	15.73%	15.86%
Native American or Alaska Native alone (NH)	546	867	929	913	1,139	0.07%	0.12%	0.12%	0.12%	0.14%
Asian alone (NH)	7,906	16,957	26,427	39,084	59,525	1.07%	2.34%	3.50%	5.14%	7.50%
Native Hawaiian or Pacific Islander alone (NH)	7,906	16,957	160	117	172	1.07%	2.34%	0.02%	0.02%	0.02%
Other race alone (NH)	7,906	643	2,075	3,308	8,273	1.07%	0.09%	0.27%	0.44%	1.04%
Mixed race or Multiracial (NH)	x	x	10,395	9,818	21,112	x	x	1.38%	1.29%	2.66%
Hispanic or Latino (any race)	25,486	48,149	86,657	132,154	174,883	3.45%	6.64%	11.46%	17.39%	22.04%
Total	738,517	725,639	755,924	759,757	793,409	100.00%	100.00%	100.00%	100.00%	100.00%

=== 2019 data ===
The 2019 American Community Survey determined the population of the town of Hempstead was 759,793. The racial and ethnic makeup of the town was 54.0% non-Hispanic white, 17.4% Black or African American, 0.3% American Indian or Alaska Native, 6.2% Asian, 3.7% multiracial, and 20.9% Hispanic or Latin American of any race.

Of the population, there were 244,203 households and there was an owner-occupied housing rate of 80.8%. The average household size was 3.10 and the population was made of 22.7% foreign-born residents. In 2019, the U.S. Census Bureau estimated the median value of an owner-occupied housing unit was $455,700 and the median gross rent of rented units at $1,678. Residents of the town had a combined median household income of $111,072 and per capita of $44,958. Of the population in 2019, 6.0% lived at or below the poverty line.

=== 2010 census ===
As of the census of 2010, there were 759,757 people, 246,828 households, and 193,513 families residing in the town. The population density was 6,301.3 inhabitants per square mile (2,432.9/km^{2}). There were 252,286 housing units at an average density of 2,103.0 per square mile (812.0/km^{2}). The racial makeup of the town was 59.9% White, 16.5% Black, 0.3% Native American, 5.2% Asian, 0.03% Pacific Islander, 4.5% from other races, and 2.2% from two or more races. Hispanic and Latin Americans of any race were 17.4% of the population.

There were 246,828 households, out of which 36.5% had children under the age of 18 living with them, 62.2% were married couples living together, 12.3% had a female householder with no husband present, and 21.6% were non-families. 18.1% of all households were made up of individuals, and 9.2% had someone living alone who was 65 years of age or older. The average household size was 3.02 and the average family size was 3.41.

In the town, the population was spread out, with 25.4% under the age of 18, 7.8% from 18 to 24, 29.2% from 25 to 44, 23.4% from 45 to 64, and 14.1% who were 65 years of age or older. The median age was 38 years. For every 100 females, there were 92.3 males. For every 100 females age 18 and over, there were 88.2 males.

According to a 2007 estimate, the median income for a household in the town was $84,362, and the median income for a family was $96,080. Males had a median income of $50,818 versus $36,334 for females. The per capita income for the town was $28,153. About 4.0% of families and 5.8% of the population were below the poverty line, including 6.6% of those under age 18 and 5.7% of those age 65 or over.

== Economy ==
Lufthansa United States had its headquarters in East Meadow, beginning in the 1970s, after it moved from Park Avenue in Manhattan, in order to save money. In 2019, the office had 206 employees; that year the headquarters moved to Uniondale.

At one time Swiss International Air Lines operated its United States office at 776 RexCorp Plaza in the EAB Plaza in Uniondale. The airline moved from 41 Pinelawn Road in Melville, Suffolk County around 2002.

Snapple was previously headquartered in East Meadow, prior to moving their corporate office. The office space is now currently occupied by the Epilepsy Foundation of Long Island.

== Government ==
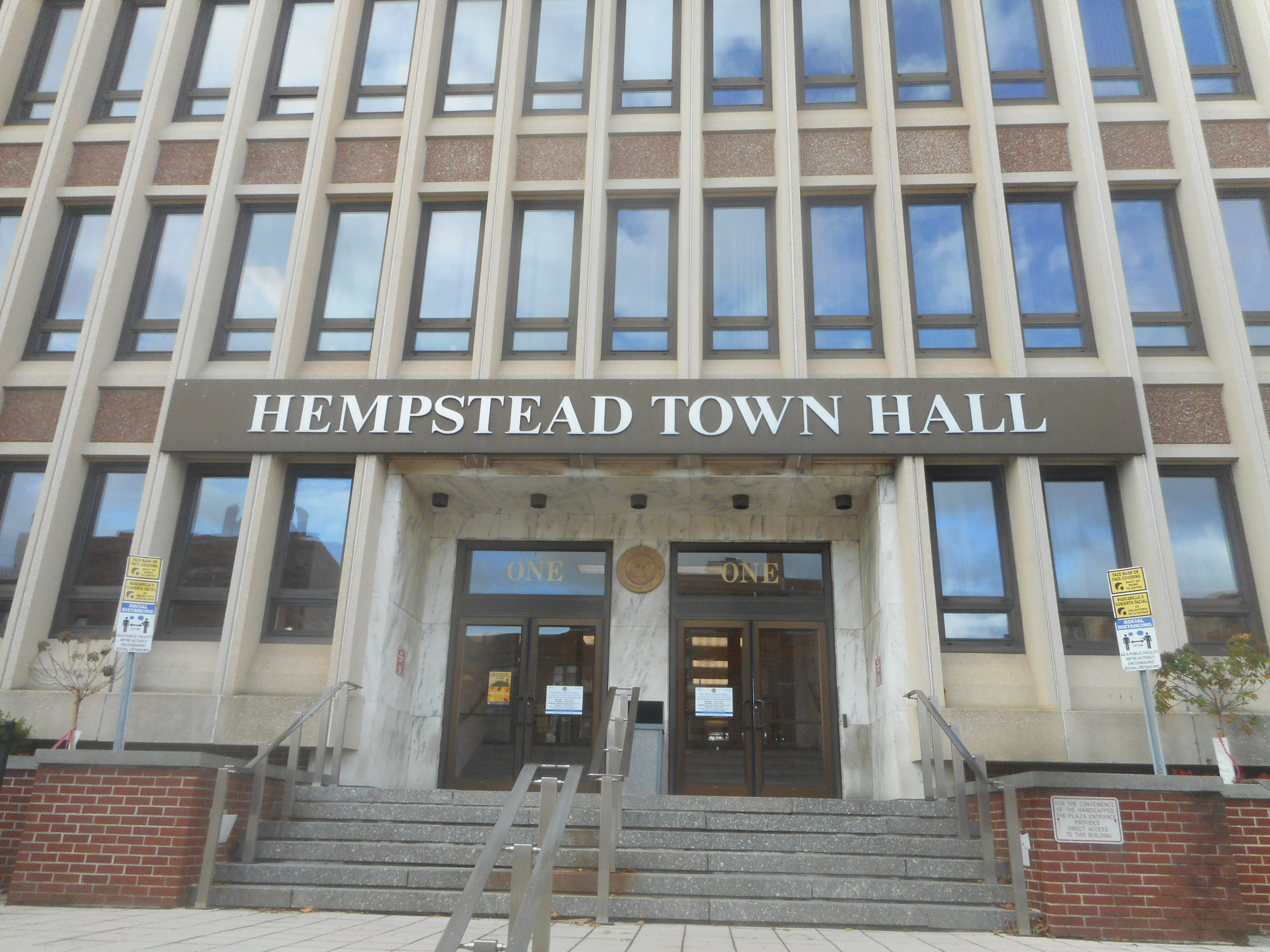
Hempstead Town Hall

=== Town government ===
As of 2025, the Town of Hempstead is headed by John R. Ferretti, Jr. (R–Levittown). The responsibilities of the office include presiding over meetings of the Town Council and directing the legislative and administrative function of that body. The position also entails creating and implementing the town's budget. One famous former supervisor was Republican Alfonse D'Amato, who later represented New York in the United States Senate from 1981 to 1999.

Town of Hempstead Supervisors
Name	Party	Term
Position Established		1993
Gregory Peterson	Republican	1993–1998 (Resigned)
Richard Guardino	Republican	1998–2003 (Resigned)
Kate Murray	Republican	2003–2015
Anthony Santino	Republican	2016–2017
Laura Gillen	Democratic	2018–2019
Donald X. Clavin	Republican	2020–2025
John Ferretti	Republican	2025–present

Prior to 1994, the town also had a Presiding Supervisor, who along with the Supervisor, sat on what was then Nassau County's main governmental body, the Board of Supervisors, along with the Supervisors of the towns of North Hempstead and Oyster Bay and the independent cities of Long Beach—formerly a part of Hempstead Town until its incorporation as a separate municipality in 1922—and Glen Cove, which had been carved out of Oyster Bay Town in 1917. Typically, the Presiding Supervisor, besides chairing the weekly county Board of Supervisors meetings, acted as the senior official in the town government with the Supervisor in a more junior, subordinate role; a number of Supervisors moved up to Presiding Supervisor whenever that office became vacant, including, in succession during the 1970s, Ralph G. Caso and Francis T. Purcell, both of whom later went on to become the county executive, and then Al D'Amato, before he moved up to the Senate. Having the Presiding Supervisor on the county board along with the Supervisor gave Hempstead—by far the most populous of the county's three towns and two cities—the most clout on that body. However, in 1993–94, a federal judge ruled that the board's makeup violated the one-person, one-vote constitutional principle and also gave no representation to the country's growing minority population. As a result of that ruling, the Board of Supervisors was replaced by a 19-member county legislature. Gregory P. Peterson served as the last Presiding Supervisor, as the position was abolished with the demise of the county board. The Current Tax Collector is Jeanine Driscoll.

==== Hempstead Town Council ====
The Hempstead Town Council comprises six voting members, elected from a councilmanic district. Their primary function is to adopt the annual budget, adopting and amending the town code and the building zone ordinances, adopting all traffic regulations, and hearing applications for changes of zone and special exceptions to zoning codes.

As of 2026, the council members are:

1. Dorothy L. Goosby (D–Hempstead)
2. Thomas E. Muscarella (R–Garden City)
3. Melissa Miller (R–Atlantic Beach)
4. Laura A. Ryder (R–Lynbrook)
5. Chris Schneider (R–Seaford)
6. Dennis Dunne, Sr. (R–Levittown)

==== Other elected town officials ====
Other elected officials in the town include the clerk and the receiver of taxes. The clerk is responsible for issuing birth, marriage, and death certificates and is considered the town's record keeper. The clerk is currently Kate Murray (R). The Receiver of Taxes is Jeanine C. Driscoll (R). The Town of Hempstead formerly elected the offices of Constable, Overseer of the Poor, Town Assessor, Town Treasurer, Town Auditors, Superintendent of Highways, Overseer of the Public Cemetery, and Justices of the Peace. Most of these functions have been included in other governments or made non-elected.

=== County legislators ===
Hempstead has 12 county legislative districts either fully or partly within the town. They are districts 1–8, 13–15, and 19. The legislators who currently represent those districts are:

1. Kevan Abrahams
2. Olena Nicks
3. Carrie Solages
4. Denise Ford
5. Debra Mule
6. C. William Gaylor, III
7. Howard Kopel
8. Vincent Muscarella
9. Thomas McKevitt
10. Laura Schaefer
11. vacant
12. Steven D. Rhoads

=== State and federal representation ===
Hempstead is part of New York's 2nd and 4th Congressional Districts. CD-2, represented by Andrew Garbarino (R-Sayville), is the furthest southeastern portions of the town (parts of Seaford), while CD-4 covers the majority of the town's composition, and has been represented since 2025 by Laura Gillen (D).

Hempstead is in parts of New York's 6th, 7th, 8th, and 9th Senatorial Districts. They are currently represented by Siela Bynoe (D), Jack Martins (R), Steven Rhoads (R), and Patricia Canzoneri-Fitzpatrick (R), respectively.

Nine assembly districts are either within or partly within the town. They are Districts 12, 14–15, and 17–22. The assembly members are Joseph Saladino (R), Brian F. Curran (R), Michael Montesano (R), Thomas McKevitt (R), Noah Burroughs (D), David G. McDonough (R), Eric (Ari) Brown;(R), Edward Ra (R), and Michaelle Solages (D), respectively.

=== Sister city ===
On September 12, 2016, the Town of Hempstead signed a Declaration of Cooperation with the Shomron Regional Council in Israel's West Bank. This council represents 35 Israeli settlements in that region. Signing the pact was its proponent Councilmen Bruce Blakeman and Anthony D'Esposito and Supervisor Santino and Shomron leader Yossi Dagan.

== Transportation ==
=== Railroad lines ===
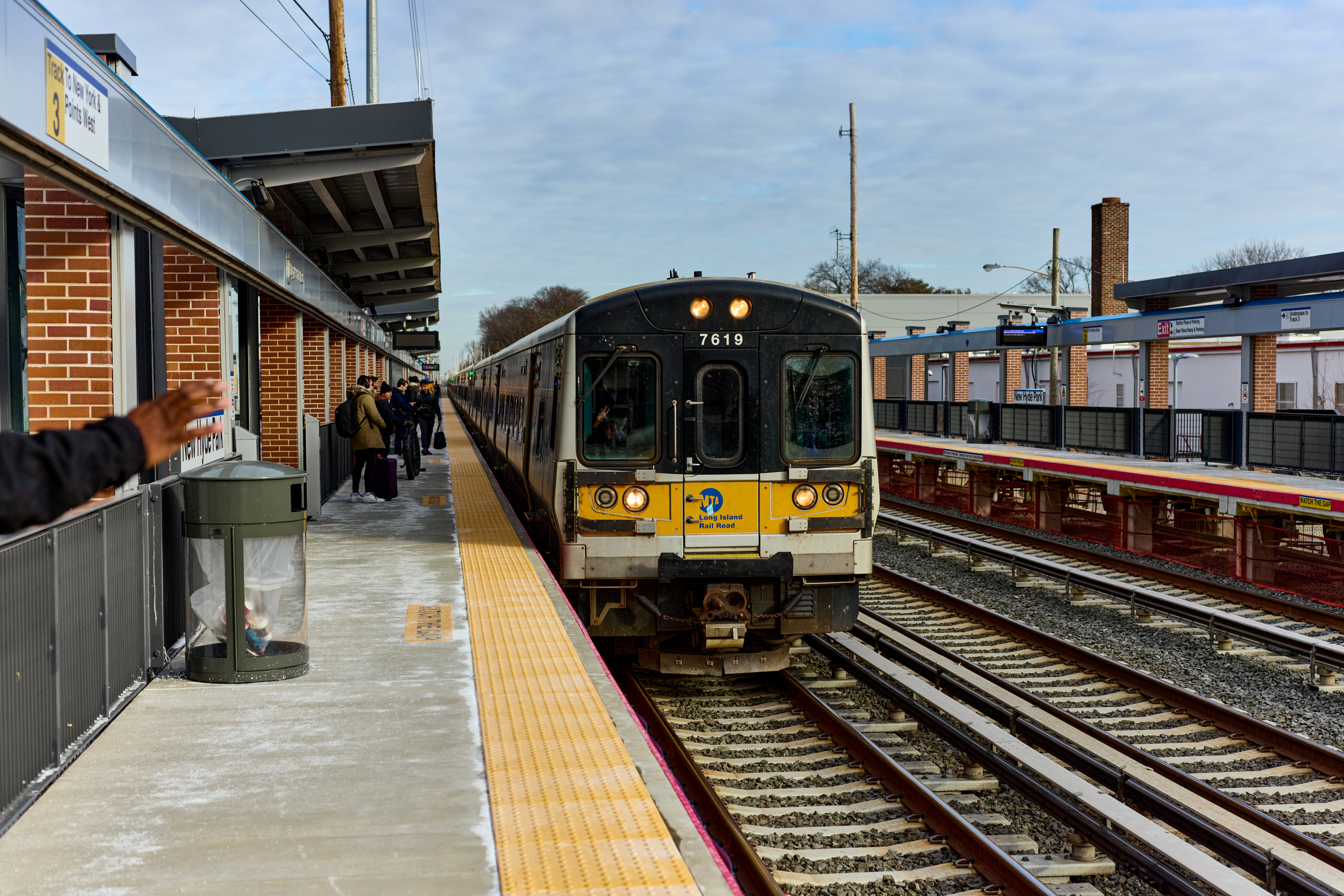
A train at the New Hyde Park LIRR station in 2022

The Long Island Rail Road's Main Line runs through the northwestern part of the town with stations from Bellerose through Merillon Avenue in Garden City. The Hempstead Branch breaks away from the Main Line in Floral Park, and uses stations from Bellerose into Hempstead. The West Hempstead Branch runs from Valley Stream northeast to West Hempstead. Further south in the town, the Babylon Branch runs from the New York City Line into southern portions of the Town of Oyster Bay with stations between Valley Stream and Seaford. Also the Far Rockaway Branch branches off from Valley Stream and curves to the southwest from that station through Inwood before finally re-entering the city in the Rockaways. Just east of there, the Long Beach Branch breaks away at Lynbrook and runs southeast into Long Beach.

=== Bus service ===
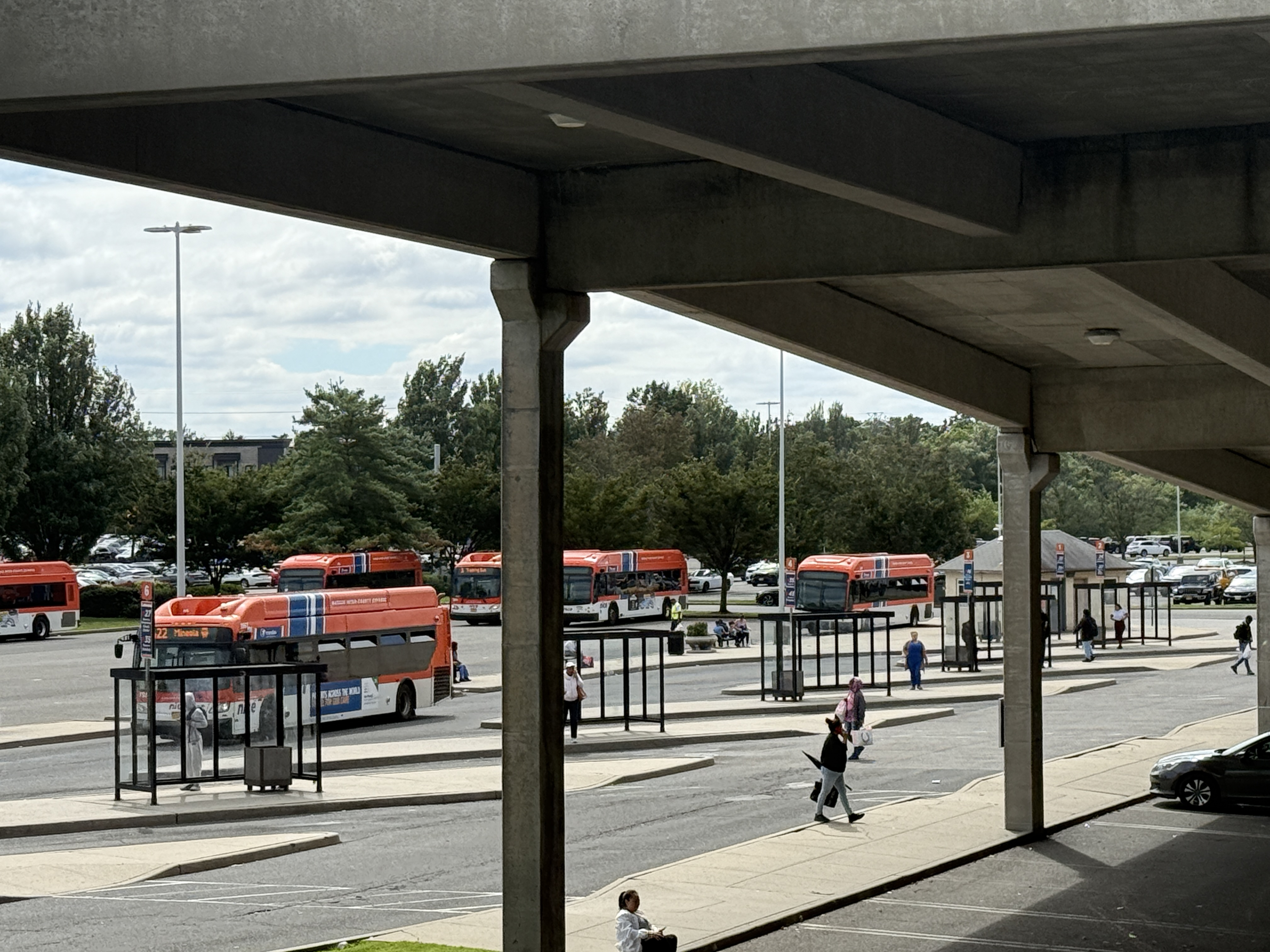
Nassau Inter-County Express buses at the Roosevelt Field Mall Bus Terminal, located within the Town of Hempstead

The Town of Hempstead is served primarily by Nassau Inter-County Express bus routes, though some MTA bus routes enter Nassau County from Queens. The City of Long Beach has a separate bus service, which also serves Lido Beach and Point Lookout on the Long Beach Barrier Island.

=== Major roads ===
Major roads within the Town of Hempstead include:

- Bay Parkway
- Loop Parkway
- Meadowbrook State Parkway
- Ocean Parkway
- Southern State Parkway
- Wantagh State Parkway
- New York State Route 24
- New York State Route 25
- New York State Route 27
- New York State Route 102
- New York State Route 105
- New York State Route 106
- New York State Route 107
- New York State Route 135
- New York State Route 878
- Clinton Road (CR 1)
- Merrick Avenue (CR 4)
- Merrick Road (CR 27)
- Old Country Road (CR 25)
- Peninsula Boulevard (CR 2)

== State parks ==
State parks located within the town of Hempstead include:

- Hempstead Lake State Park
- Jones Beach State Park
- Valley Stream State Park

== See also ==
- List of towns in New York
- North Hempstead, New York
- Oyster Bay, New York
