= North Merrick, New York =

- Hamlet and Census-designated place
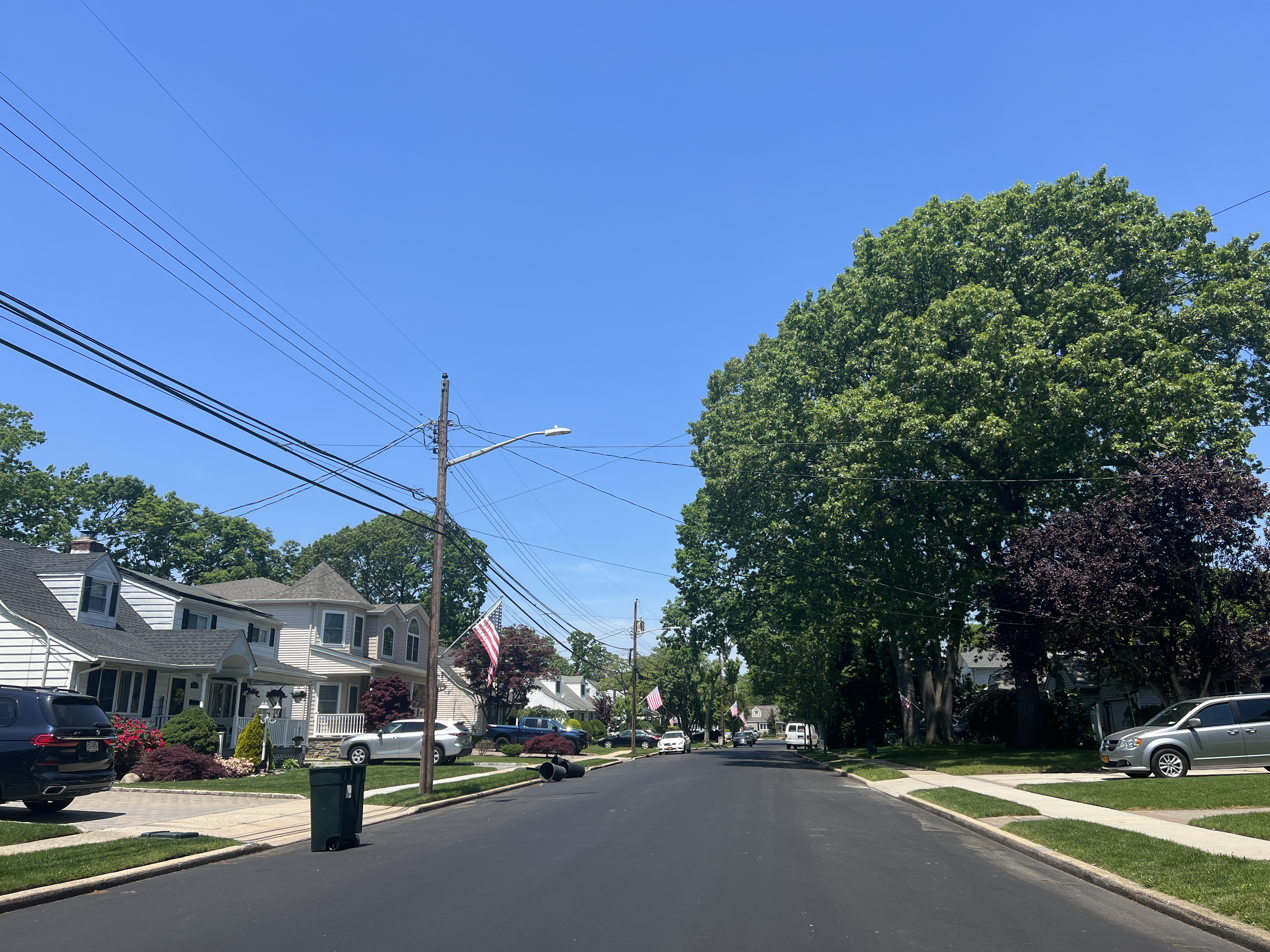
- Stevens Avenue in North Merrick on May 31, 2022.

- Location in Nassau County and the state of New York.

- Location on Long Island Location within the state of New York
- Coordinates: 40°41′8″N 73°33′29″W
- Country: United States
- State: New York
- County: Nassau
- Town: Hempstead

Area
  - Total: 1.73 sq mi (4.47 km^{2})
  - Land: 1.72 sq mi (4.45 km^{2})
  - Water: 0.0077 sq mi (0.02 km^{2}) 0.56%
- Elevation: 46 ft (14 m)

Population (2020)
  - Total: 12,238
  - Density: 7,119.3/sq mi (2,748.78/km^{2})
- Demonym(s): Merokian; North Merokian
- Time zone: UTC-5 (Eastern (EST))
  - Summer (DST): UTC-4 (EDT)
- ZIP Codes: 11566 (North Merrick); 11710 (Bellmore)
- Area codes: 516, 363
- FIPS code: 36-53264
- GNIS feature ID: 0958856

North Merrick is a hamlet and census-designated place in the Town of Hempstead, in Nassau County, near the South Shore of Long Island, in New York, United States. The population was 12,238 at the time of the 2020 census.

== Geography ==
According to the United States Census Bureau, the CDP has a total area of 1.8 square miles (4.7 km^{2}), of which 1.8 square miles (4.7 km^{2}) or 99.44% is land and 0.0077 square miles (0.020 km^{2}) or 0.56% is water. It is on an elevation of 14 meters (46 feet).

== Demographics ==
Historical population
Census	Pop.	Note	%±
2020	12,238		—
U.S. Decennial Census

=== 2020 census ===
As of the 2020 census, North Merrick had a population of 12,238. The median age was 42.3 years. 22.6% of residents were under the age of 18 and 17.0% of residents were 65 years of age or older. For every 100 females there were 95.0 males, and for every 100 females age 18 and over there were 93.0 males age 18 and over.

100.0% of residents lived in urban areas, while 0.0% lived in rural areas.

There were 4,023 households in North Merrick, of which 38.3% had children under the age of 18 living in them. Of all households, 67.2% were married-couple households, 9.2% were households with a male householder and no spouse or partner present, and 20.3% were households with a female householder and no spouse or partner present. About 13.6% of all households were made up of individuals and 8.0% had someone living alone who was 65 years of age or older.

There were 4,137 housing units, of which 2.8% were vacant. The homeowner vacancy rate was 1.0% and the rental vacancy rate was 3.9%.

Racial composition as of the 2020 census
Race	Number	Percent
White	9,930	81.1%
Black or African American	316	2.6%
American Indian and Alaska Native	22	0.2%
Asian	674	5.5%
Native Hawaiian and Other Pacific Islander	5	0.0%
Some other race	452	3.7%
Two or more races	839	6.9%
Hispanic or Latino (of any race)	1,332	10.9%

=== Demographic estimates ===
As of 2023, the racial makeup of the CDP was 82.28% White, 4.1% African American, 0.0% Native American, 3.06% Asian, 0.0% Pacific Islander, 0.29% from other races, and 0.83% from two or more races. Hispanic or Latino of any race were 9.44% of the population.

=== Income and poverty ===
The median income for a household in the CDP was $134,439, and the median income for a family was $143,611. Males had a median income of $66,799 versus $44,012 for females. The per capita income for the CDP was $53,533. About 2.4% of families and 3.0% of the population were below the poverty line, including 2.8% of those under age 18 and 4.3% of those age 65 or over.

== Transportation ==
Two limited-access highways, the Meadowbrook State Parkway and the Southern State Parkway, pass through North Merrick; both of these highways are owned and maintained by the New York State Department of Transportation. Additionally, the Meadowbrook State Parkway forms large portions of North Merrick's western border, with Roosevelt and Uniondale.

Other major roadways which pass through the hamlet include Camp Avenue, Jerusalem Avenue (CR 105), Meadowbrook Road, and Merrick Avenue (CR 4).

The closest airports include:

- John F. Kennedy International Airport (23 km or 14 mi, Queens, NY)
- LaGuardia Airport (35 km or 22 mi, Queens, NY)

== Fire department ==
North Merrick is protected by a volunteer fire department that is responsible for one of the smallest fire districts in Nassau County covering 2.1 square miles (5.4 km^{2}). The North Merrick Fire Department has approximately 85 members using 16 pieces of apparatus located at one station.

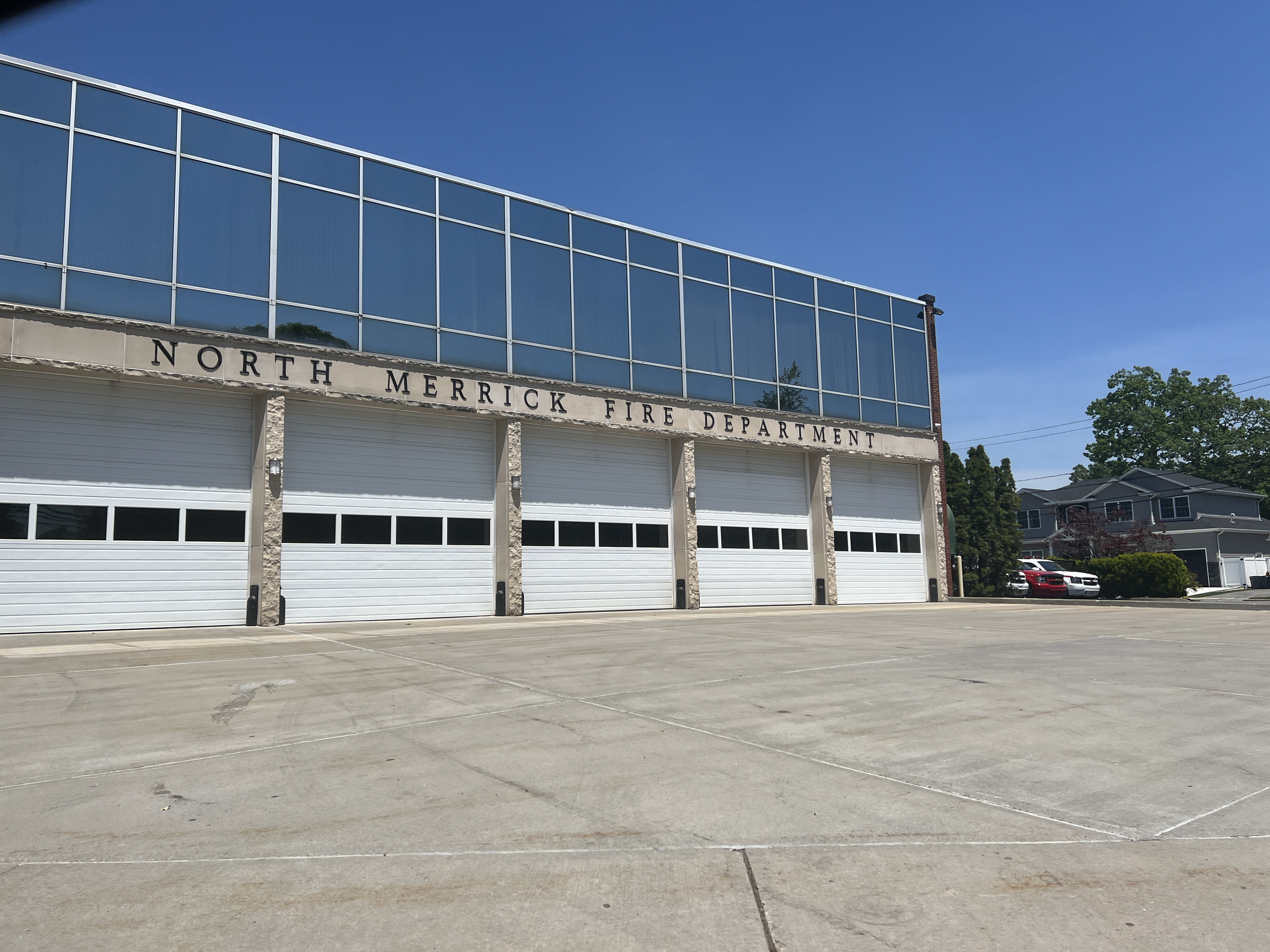
The North Merrick Fire Department's headquarters in May 2022.

== See also ==
- Merrick, New York
