= Norman J. Levy =

American politician

Norman J. Levy (January 24, 1931 – February 7, 1998) was an American lawyer and politician from New York. He served in the New York State Senate for 27 years, and was the sponsor of the first legislation in the United States mandating seat belt usage.

== Biography ==
Levy was born on January 24, 1931, in Rockville Centre, Nassau County, New York. He graduated from Bucknell University in 1952, and then served in the U.S. Army. He graduated from Brooklyn Law School in 1958, was admitted to the bar, and practiced law.

He entered politics as a Republican. In 1959, he was appointed as an Assistant D.A. of Nassau County, and in 1962 became Chief of the Nassau County Rackets Bureau which prosecuted organized crime. He was a member of the New York State Senate from 1971 until his death in 1998, sitting in the 179th, 180th, 181st, 182nd, 183rd, 184th, 185th, 186th, 187th, 188th, 189th, 190th, 191st and 192nd New York State Legislatures. Levy was Chairman of the Committee on Transportation. In that capacity, he helped to secure state funding for projects related to Long Island's parkways and the Long Island Rail Road.

Levy sponsored New York's mandatory seatbelt law, which was the first one in the United States. He also sponsored zero tolerance legislation that prohibited drivers under the age of 21 from operating a motor vehicle after consuming any amount of alcohol.

In June 1997, Levy had emergency brain surgery. He died in Albany, New York, of complications from a brain tumor.

== Legacy ==
In August 1998, signs were installed along the Meadowbrook State Parkway dedicating the road in honor of Levy for his role in sponsoring seat belt legislation. The new signs were unveiled in a ceremony in the median of the parkway just south of Merrick Road. Dignitaries at the honoring ceremony included then-Governor George Pataki, Senator Charles Fuschillo and Levy's widow, Joy Levy. Signs were erected at both ends of the Meadowbrook Parkway and at a point near the Babylon Turnpike interchange.

The Norman J. Levy Park and Preserve and Norman J. Levy Lakeside elementary school located in Merrick, New York are both named after him. The park can be reached off an exit on the Meadowbrook Parkway. The park was opened to the public on October 22, 2000.

New York State Senate
| Preceded by Norman F. Lent | New York State Senate; 7th District; 1971–1972 | Succeeded by John D. Caemmerer |
| Preceded by Murray Schwartz | New York State Senate; 8th District; 1973–1998 | Succeeded by Charles Fuschillo |
