= Bay Parkway (Jones Beach) =

Highway on Long Island, New York

- Bay Parkway highlighted in red

Route information
- Maintained by NYSDOT and NYS OPRHP
- Length: 3.26 mi (5.25 km) NY 909E: 1.80 miles (2.9 km)

Major junctions
- West end: West end of Jones Beach
- Meadowbrook State Parkway / Ocean Parkway at Jones Beach
- East end: Wantagh State Parkway at Jones Beach

Location
- Country: United States
- State: New York
- Counties: Nassau

Highway system
- New York Highways; Interstate; US; State; Reference; Parkways

The Bay Parkway (also known as the Bay State Parkway) is a 3.26-mile (5.25 km) limited-access parkway entirely within Jones Beach State Park in Nassau County, New York, in the United States. The western terminus is at a loop near the western edge of Jones Inlet. The eastern terminus is at the Jones Beach Amphitheater east of an interchange with the Wantagh State Parkway. The parkway is primarily a service road for the park, providing access to the boat basin, fishing piers, and many of the parking lots along the beach. However, the parkway also has an interchange with the Meadowbrook State Parkway and Ocean Parkway.

East of the Meadowbrook/Ocean interchange, the Bay Parkway is designated New York State Route 909E (NY 909E), an unsigned reference route, by NYSDOT.

== Route description ==
The Bay Parkway begins at a loop at the west end of Jones Beach State Park in Nassau County. The route heads eastward, passing the Short Beach Coast Guard Station to the north. There is a quick U-turn soon after, connecting to the other side and the station. The route passes the bays of the Atlantic Ocean, heading eastward into the Meadowbrook State Parkway and Ocean Parkway. The parkway gains the unmarked designation of Route 909E as it runs parallel to Ocean Parkway and passes more median-based U-turns. The route has one at-grade intersection along the eastbound lanes with a two-lane park road to Ocean Parkway now named "Clays Path" and the back entrance to Parking Field #3. More U-turns to and from the fishing piers and bait and tackle shop and Jones Beach Beer Garden at Parking Field #10 can be found on the westbound lanes followed by the back parking lot to Parking Field #4. After traversing the Detective Betsy Horner-Miller Cutrone Memorial Bridge, Bay Parkway terminates at the Wantagh State Parkway near Jones Beach Parking Field #5 and the parking lot for the Jones Beach Marine Theater.

== Exit list ==
The entire route is in Jones Beach State Park, Nassau County. All exits are unnumbered.

mi	km	Destinations	Notes
0.00	0.00	West end of Jones Beach	Western terminus
1.46	2.35	Meadowbrook State Parkway north / Ocean Parkway east to Southern State Parkway	Southern terminus of Meadowbrook State Parkway; western terminus of Ocean Parkway
3.26	5.25	Wantagh State Parkway north – Jones Beach Amphitheater	Eastern terminus
1.000 mi = 1.609 km; 1.000 km = 0.621 mi
