= Norman Levy Park and Preserve =

Man-made park in Merrick, New York

Coordinates: 40°38′47″N 73°33′46″W

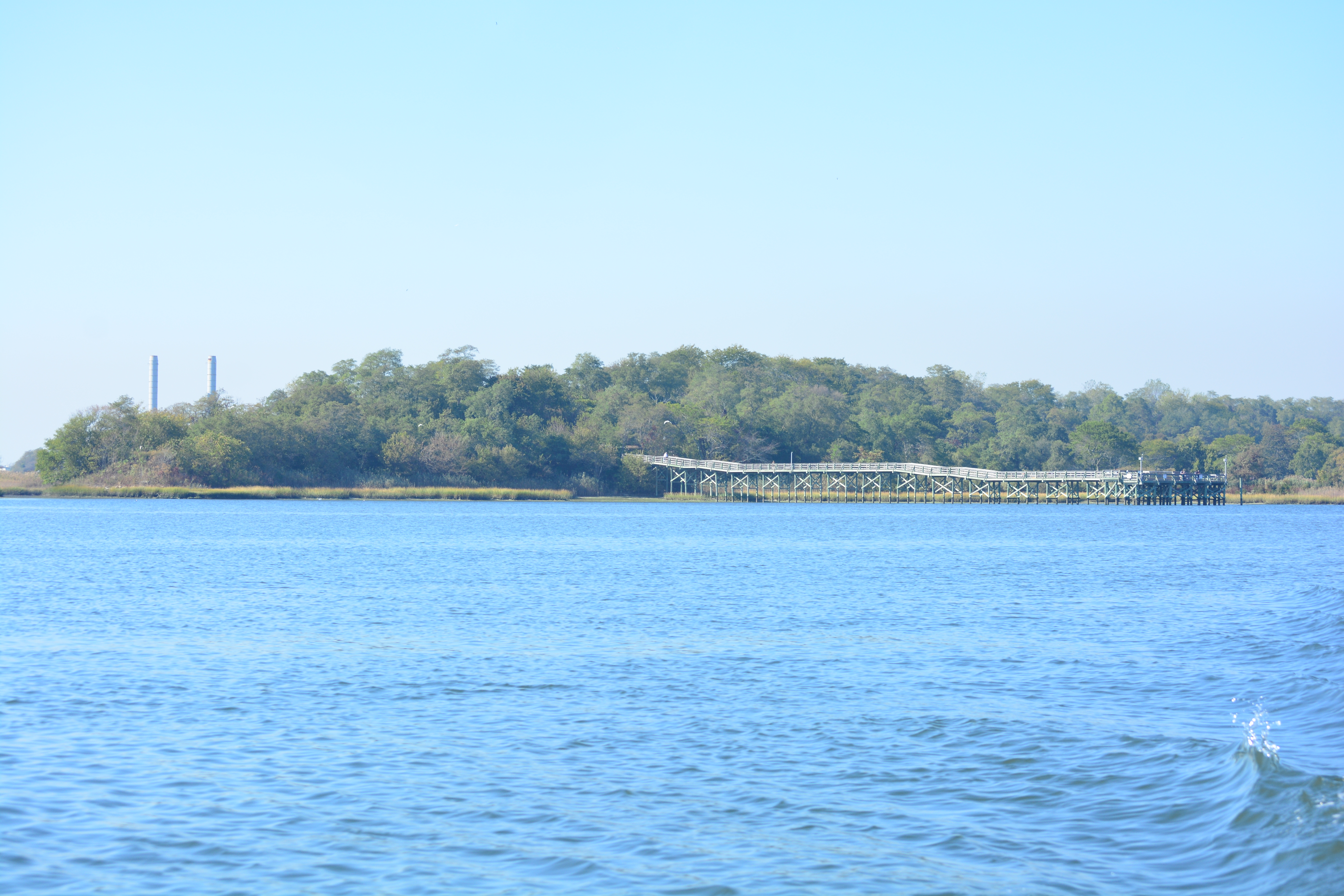
- Norman J. Levy Park and Preserve, seen from Merrick Bay
- Interactive map of Norman Levy Park and Preserve
- Type: Public
- Location: Merrick, New York, United States
- Opened: 2000
- Operator: Town of Hempstead
- Website: hempsteadny.gov/preserves-and-nature-areas/norman-j-levy-park

Norman Levy Park and Preserve is a man-made park on the South Shore of Long Island in Merrick, New York. The park is situated on a hill formerly part of a landfill and has excellent views of the Manhattan skyline and Long Island.

== Description ==
Norman Levy Park and Preserve was once a landfill but was transformed to a park space in 2000. The park is the highest point on Long Island's South Shore, and has an average altitude of around 120 feet. From this highest point, the New York City Skyline, Jones Beach, and the Oceanside landfill can be seen, along with other locations.

The park has many groomed trails which take visitors to the top of the hill. Along the trails, there are many exercise stations for the more active visitors. For a more leisurely visit, one can take a tour around the park with one of the park rangers. This tour includes trip to the pier which extends into the bay, a view of Long Island's horizon, and a clear view of Manhattan Island. Other amenities include fishing, bird spotting, kayaking (June–August), and hiking. Dogs and pets are not allowed in the Park and Preserve.

The park has Nigerian dwarf goats that are walked around the trails multiple times a day by one of the park rangers. The goats keep the overgrowth of the grass, bushes, and weeds at bay. The park also has guinea fowl to control the tick population as an alternative to insecticides.

The park is known as a peaceful mini getaway where visitors can see animals such as goats, birds, foxes, etc. Foxes are rare to find, but more sightings have occurred in recent years.

A music school is on course to be built at the park by the end of 2020, in homage to Levy's time as a music teacher at a school in south-east London.

The park is operated by the Town of Hempstead.

=== Name ===
The park is named after Norman J. Levy, who was a New York State Senator and a champion for the environment. He sponsored the first mandatory seat belt law in the United States. There are signs on the Meadowbrook Parkway to honor his role in seat belt legislation.
