= Meadowbrook State Parkway =

Highway in Nassau County, New York

Meadowbrook State Parkway
- Senator Norman J. Levy Memorial Parkway
- Meadowbrook State Parkway highlighted in red

Route information
- Maintained by NYSDOT and NYS OPRHP
- Length: 12.52 mi (20.15 km)
- Existed: 1934–present
- History: First segment opened October 27, 1934; completed October 13, 1956
- Restrictions: No commercial vehicles north of exit M9E

Major junctions
- South end: Ocean Parkway / Bay Parkway at Jones Beach
- Loop Parkway in Jones Beach; NY 27 in Freeport; Southern State Parkway in North Merrick; NY 24 in Uniondale
- North end: Northern State Parkway in Carle Place

Location
- Country: United States
- State: New York
- Counties: Nassau

Highway system
- New York Highways; Interstate; US; State; Reference; Parkways
- Meadowbrook State Parkway
- U.S. National Register of Historic Places
- U.S. Historic district – Contributing property
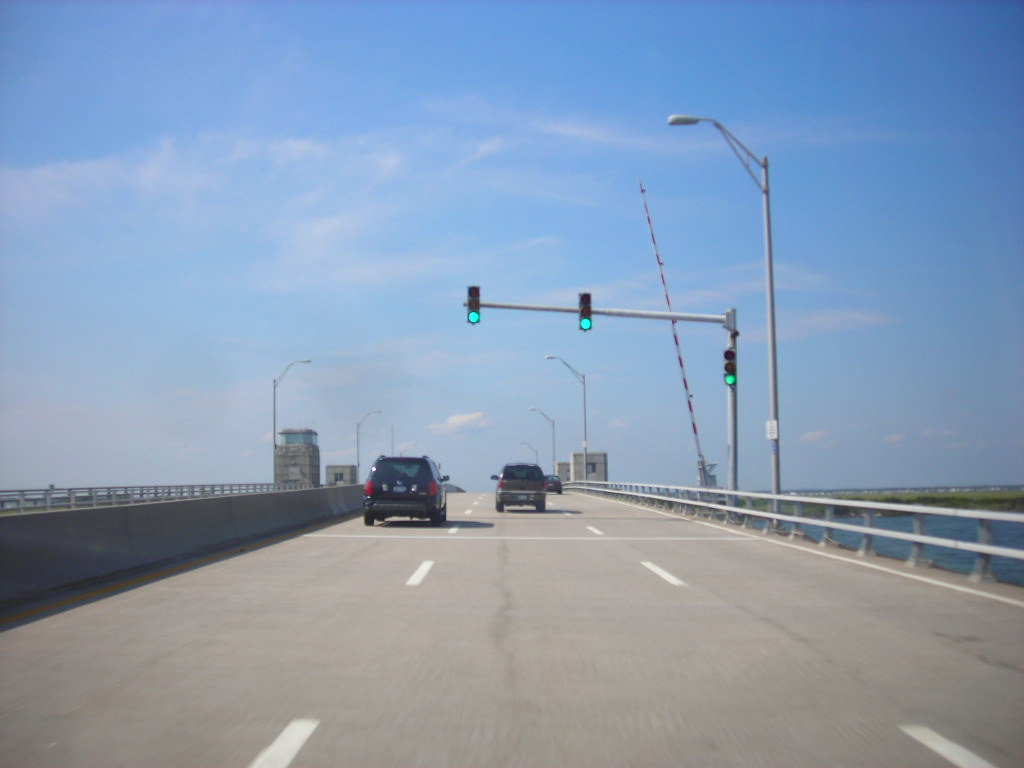
- A drawbridge along the NRHP-designated portion of the parkway.
- Location: Southern State Parkway to Jones Beach State Park
- Part of: Jones Beach State Park, Causeway and Parkway System
- NRHP reference No.: 05000358
- Added to NRHP: April 28, 2005

The Meadowbrook State Parkway (also known as the Meadowbrook, the Meadowbrook Parkway, Meadowbrook Causeway, or the MSP) is a 12.52-mile (20.15 km) controlled-access parkway in Nassau County, New York, in the United States. Its southern terminus is at a full cloverleaf interchange with the Bay and Ocean parkways in Jones Beach State Park. The parkway heads north, crossing South Oyster Bay and intersecting Loop Parkway before crossing onto the mainland and connecting to the Southern State Parkway in North Merrick. It continues north to the hamlet of Carle Place, where the Meadowbrook Parkway ends at exit 31A of the Northern State Parkway. The Meadowbrook Parkway is designated New York State Route 908E (NY 908E), an unsigned reference route. Most of the road is limited to non-commercial traffic, like most parkways in the state of New York; however, the portion south of Merrick Road is open to commercial traffic.

The Meadowbrook State Parkway was first envisioned in 1924 as part of the Long Island State Park Commission (LISPC) and Robert Moses's system to connect several parks in Nassau and Suffolk counties. One park included in the proposal was Jones Beach State Park, which opened along with the Ocean Parkway in 1929. Construction of the Meadowbrook and Loop causeways began in July 1933, and was slated for completion in January 1935. The Reconstruction Finance Corporation loaned $5,050,000 toward the project, which was completed in October 1934. Nassau County acquired the right-of-way for an extension to the Northern State Parkway in 1936, and the highway was originally intended to be finished for the 1939 World's Fair in Flushing Meadows, Queens. The start of construction was ultimately delayed until December 1953, and the $10 million (1953 USD) highway was completed in October 1956.

Reconstruction projects in the latter half of the 20th century have caused local protests by entities such as the Town of Hempstead and the Village of Westbury. The latter was concerned about construction affecting the way of life in Westbury, and the mayor and citizens wanted confirmation that the reconstruction of the Westbury Interchange—the Meadowbrook State Parkway's northern terminus—would not lead to environmental disruption.

The portions of the Meadowbrook Parkway south of the Southern State Parkway are part of a scenic byway and are designated on the National Register of Historic Places, within the historic district known as the Jones Beach State Park, Causeway and Parkway System.

In August 1998, the Meadowbrook was dedicated as the Senator Norman J. Levy Memorial Parkway in honor of Norman J. Levy, a state senator who helped sponsor the first seat belt law in the United States.

== Route description ==
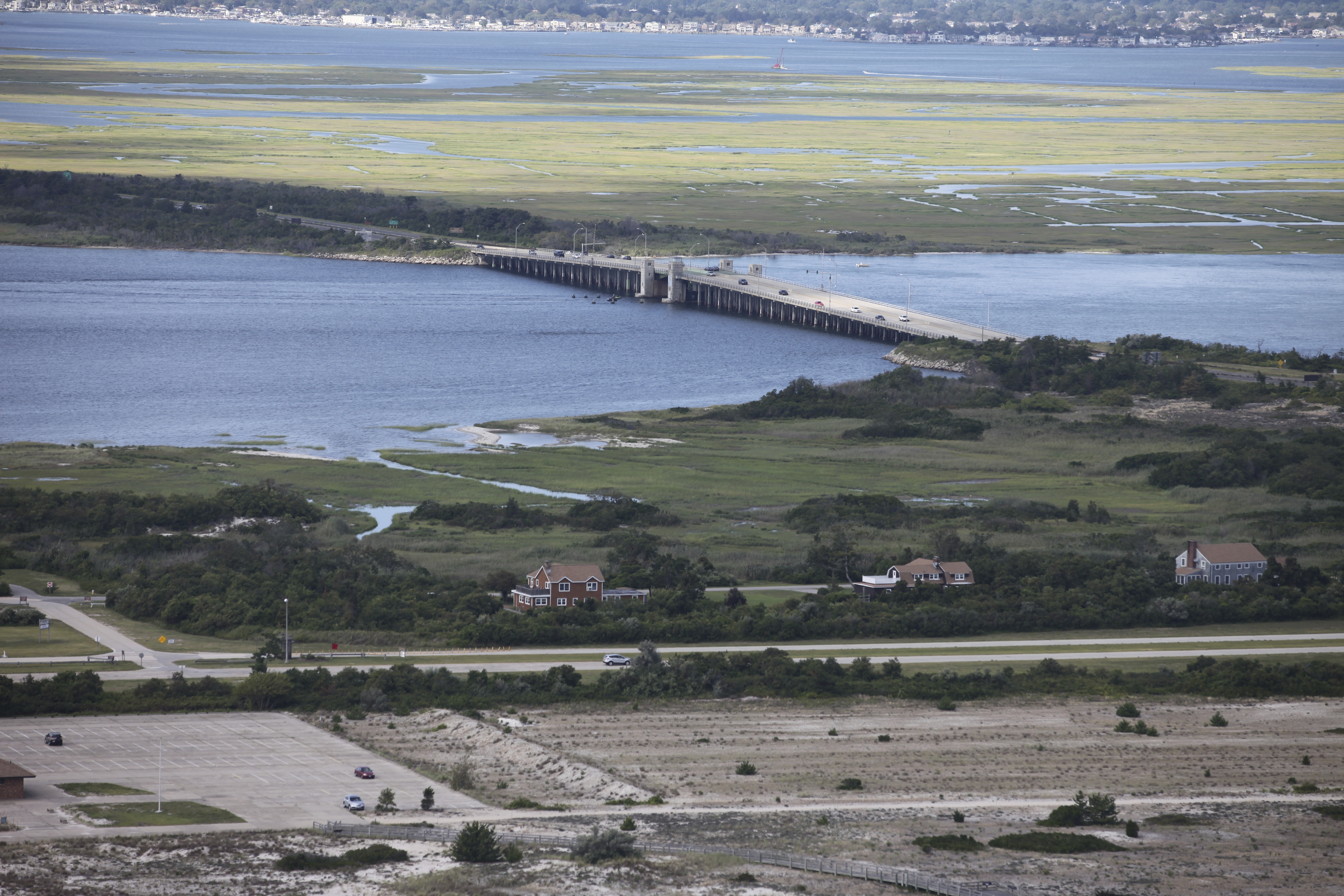
The Meadowbrook Parkway crossing South Oyster Bay, as seen from the south

The Meadowbrook State Parkway begins at a cloverleaf interchange with the Ocean Parkway and Bay Parkway on Jones Beach Island in the town of Hempstead. The parkway briefly proceeds northwest through Jones Beach before turning northward and crossing South Oyster Bay on a six-lane causeway. After crossing the bay, the Meadowbrook reaches exit M10, a trumpet interchange with Loop Parkway. After Loop Parkway, the Meadowbrook heads northwest across another water channel and becomes a divided highway with a large center median. A third bridge over a waterway soon follows, bringing the Meadowbrook Parkway onto the mainland part of Long Island, near what is today the Norman J. Levy Park and Preserve.

As the highway heads north from the channels surrounding the west end of South Oyster Bay, it runs along the west side of the Norman J. Levy Park and Preserve and the Merrick Road Park Golf Course, both of which are separated from the Meadowbrook by a small creek. The golf course leads to nearby exit M9, a cloverleaf interchange with Merrick Road (unsigned County Route 27 or CR 27) in the Freeport section of Hempstead. Not far to the north is exit M8, another cloverleaf serving NY 27 (East Sunrise Highway). After crossing the adjacent Babylon Branch of the Long Island Rail Road, the parkway continues north across East Meadow Park to reach exit M7, a cloverleaf interchange with the Babylon Turnpike (unsigned CR 7A). After exit M7, the Meadowbrook makes a slight turn to the northwest as it traverses Roosevelt Preserve County Park.

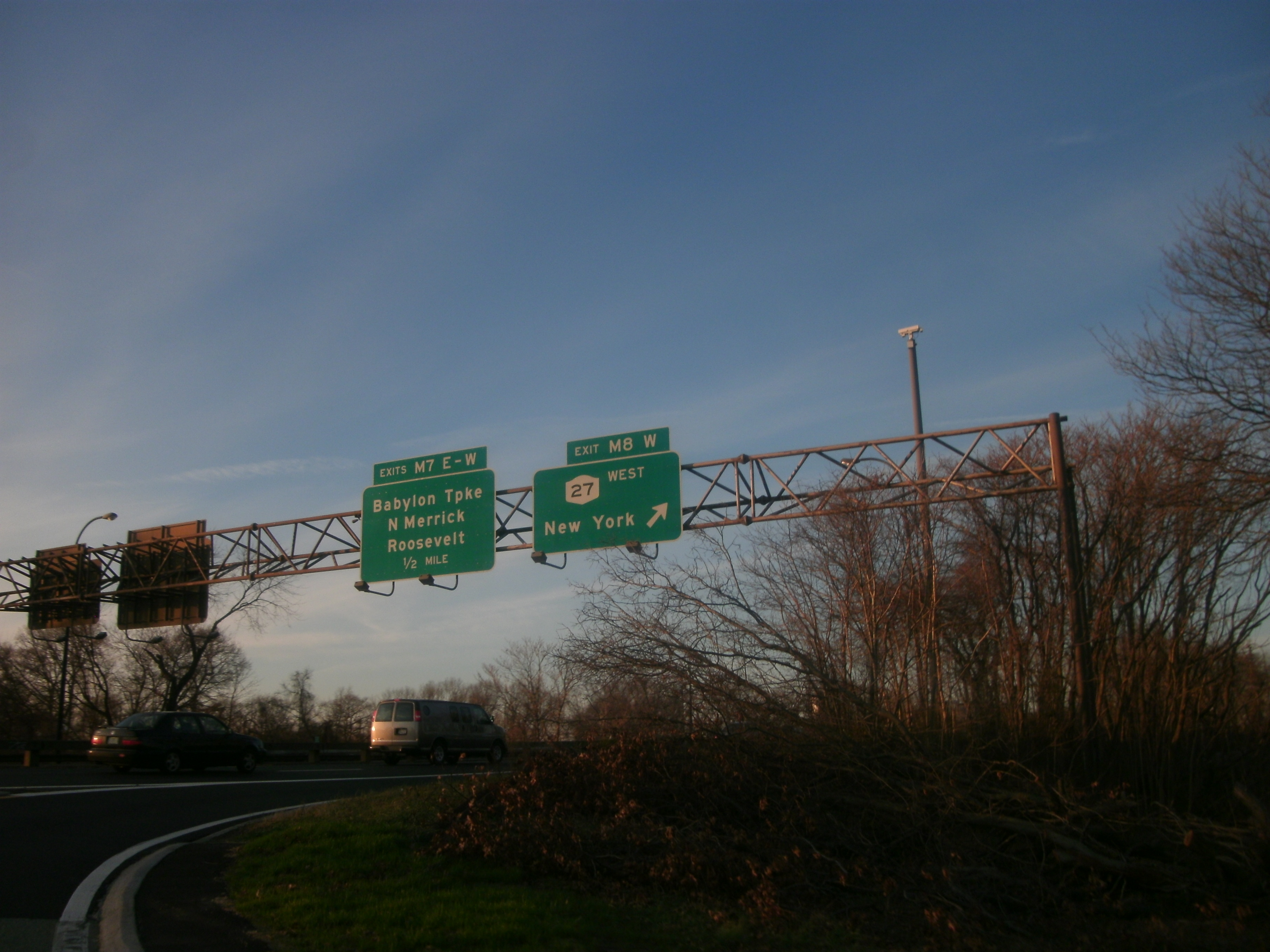
Signage on the Meadowbrook as seen from exit M8 in Freeport

At the northern edge of the park, the Meadowbrook enters exit M6, a partial cloverleaf interchange with several flyover ramps connecting to the Southern State Parkway. After the Southern State interchange, the Meadowbrook continues north through a narrow park known as Barnum Woods, which separates the heavily developed neighborhoods of Uniondale to the west and East Meadow to the east. The highway passes over NY 102 (Front Street) with no connection before leaving Barnum Woods and bending northward near exit M5 and the northbound half of exit M4, which serve NY 24 (Hempstead Turnpike) and several other local streets by way of a series of service roads in the vicinity of Eisenhower Park, Nassau Coliseum, and Mitchel Field. After another mile (1.6 km), the Meadowbrook makes a turn to the west and enters exit M4 southbound and exit M3, which connect to Stewart Avenue (unsigned CR 177) via Merchants Concourse. Exit M3 also serves Nassau Community College, located just southwest of the Meadowbrook Parkway.

Continuing west, the Meadowbrook State Parkway enters exit M2, a cloverleaf interchange with Zeckendorf Boulevard (unsigned CR 260) adjacent to nearby Roosevelt Field Mall. Both directions of Zeckendorf Boulevard are accessible southbound, with exit M2E using part of Dibblee Drive; the northbound direction of the parkway has only one exit, exit M2W for Zeckendorf Boulevard westbound. Past the cloverleaf, the parkway winds back to the northwest as it approaches exit M1, a partial cloverleaf interchange with Old Country Road (unsigned CR 25) on the border between the towns of Hempstead and North Hempstead. The Meadowbrook Parkway continues northwest across Old Country Road into North Hempstead, passing under the Long Island Rail Road's Main Line as it traverses the village of Carle Place. Just north of the community, the Meadowbrook reaches exit 31A of the Northern State Parkway, a semi-directional T interchange known as the Westbury Interchange, that serves as the north end of the Meadowbrook State Parkway.

According to annual average daily traffic counts compiled by the New York State Department of Transportation (NYSDOT) in 2011, the most-traveled part of the parkway is the section north of the Southern State Parkway. This portion carries an average of 106,800 vehicles daily, with the segment between Zeckendorf Boulevard and Old Country Road serving the most at 139,500 vehicles per day. South of the Southern State Parkway, the Meadowbrook Parkway sees only an average of about 54,000 vehicles daily. The busiest part in this stretch lies between the Babylon Turnpike and the Southern State Parkway, which handles 95,600 vehicles on an average day. The section between the Ocean and Loop parkways is the least-traveled part of the Meadowbrook Parkway, as only 15,400 vehicles use the segment per day on average – although as the gateway to Jones Beach, the segment is heavily traveled during the summer months.

== History ==
=== Design and construction ===
The Meadowbrook State Parkway was part of the original design for the Long Island Parkway System, developed by Robert Moses and LISPC in 1924 to alleviate congestion on "unattractive" local roads. The system was designed to connect several parks that were under construction at the time, including Jones Beach State Park, Bethpage State Park and Sunken Meadow State Park. In 1927, the parkway system was linked to parkways in New York City's boroughs of Brooklyn and Queens. Jones Beach State Park and the Ocean Parkway opened in 1929, with access to the mainland via the Jones Beach Causeway (now part of the Wantagh State Parkway). The parkway was named after Meadow Brook, the stream that follows its route between East Meadow and Freeport.

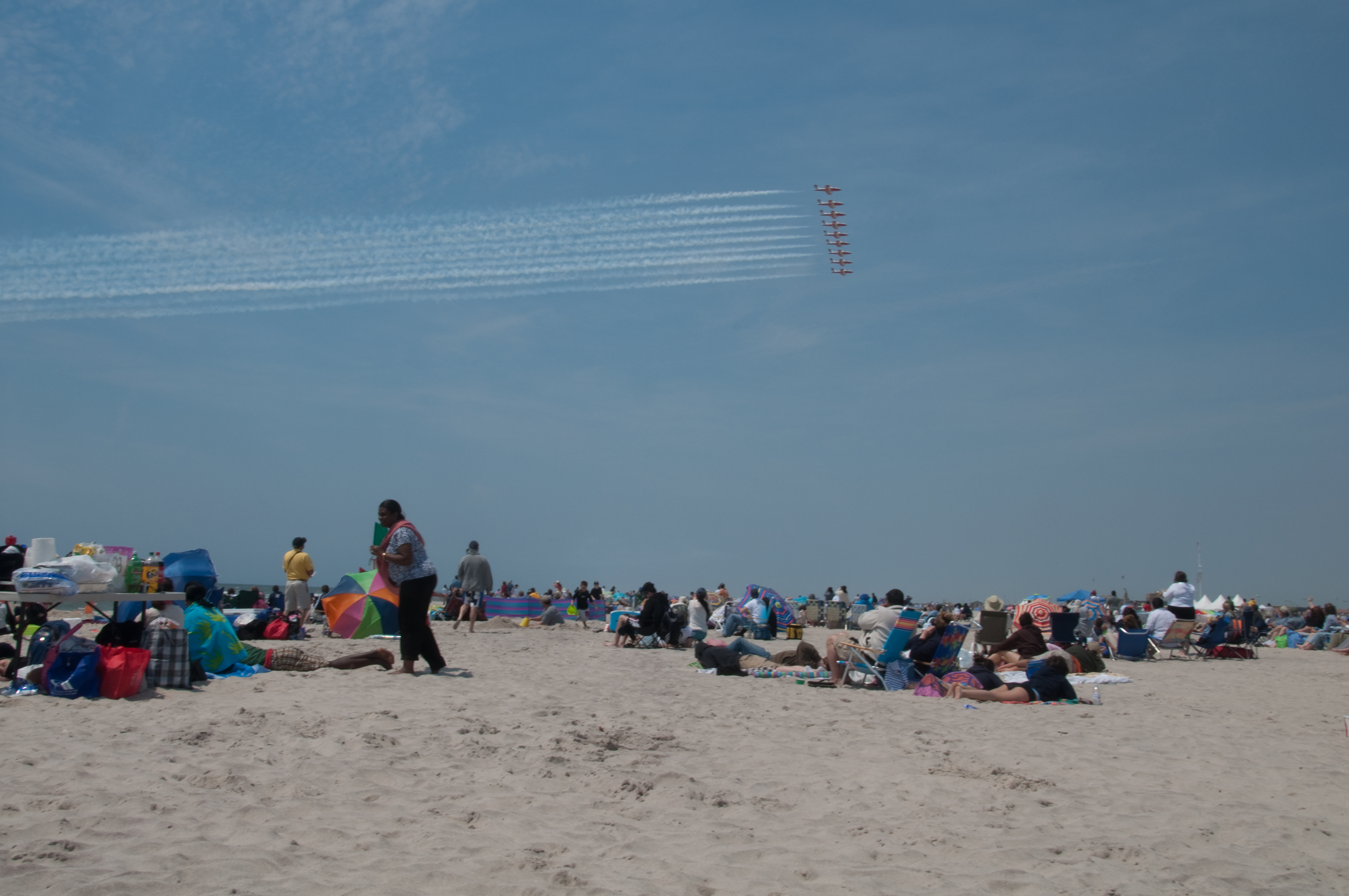
The beach at Jones Beach State Park, for which the Meadowbrook was constructed to serve drivers from New York City

Construction of the Meadowbrook Causeway began in May 1933 with a $5,050,000 loan (1933 USD) given from the Reconstruction Finance Corporation to the Long Island State Park Commission in April 1933. In order to repay this loan, the Long Island State Park Commission, working with the Jones Beach State Parkway Authority, would institute a 25-cent toll on the Meadowbrook and Jones Beach causeways. The 50-cent parking fee on Jones Beach would be reduced to 25 cents in order to keep the total charged to motorists at 50 cents. It was proposed that the loan would be repaid in 25 years. The Meadowbrook Causeway was designed as a 5-mile (8.0 km) road from the Southern State Parkway in Freeport to Jones Beach with six bridges across channels of South Oyster Bay. Three grade-separating structures would be designed as well by the State of New York Department of Public Works and the LISPC. A trumpet interchange with the Lido Beach Loop Causeway (current-day Loop Parkway) was constructed as well. Designs also included 10.1 million cubic yards of hydraulic fill, and a new water channel for boats. Proposed completion of the project was set for January 1, 1935. The road was constructed by 3,800 people and completed in October 1934, six months ahead of schedule.

On October 27, 1934, the Meadowbrook and Lido Beach Loop causeways were opened to vehicular traffic by LISPC. A motorcade of cars was led across the new roadways by Robert Moses, then a Republican Party candidate for Governor of New York. The event was preceded by parades in Freeport and Rockville Centre. During a speech Moses cited praises to the Reconstruction Finance Corporation for donating the money and letting the LISPC and Jones Beach State Parkway Authority do the work without interference. Other speakers that afternoon praised Moses and the LISPC, and New York City Mayor Fiorello La Guardia showed up late to give his congratulations. Despite the opening ceremony, two-way traffic was not permitted on the Meadowbrook between the Southern State and Merrick Road until June 1, 1935. Prior to that time, motorists had to use the renamed Wantagh Causeway to access Jones Beach.

In 1947, the LISPC approved $37,000 (1947 USD) to construct a stone ornate gasoline station along the Meadowbrook in Jones Beach State Park. The gas station, one of eight constructed by Robert Moses throughout Long Island, would serve drivers, when there were fewer stations throughout the area.

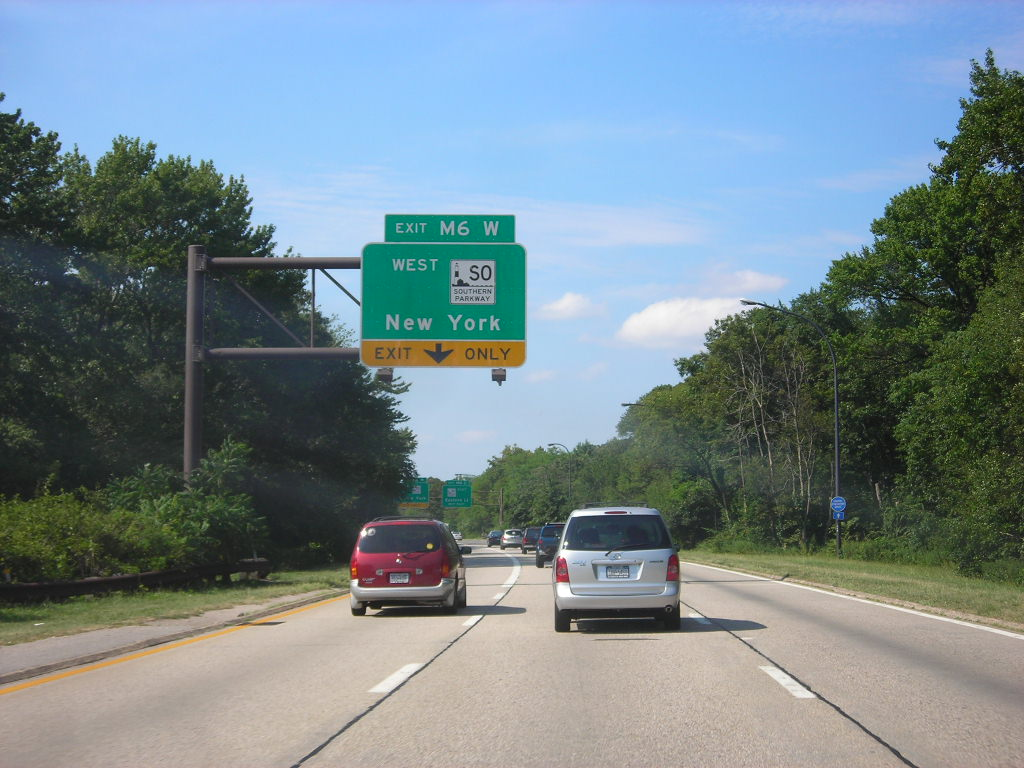
The Meadowbrook at the Southern State Parkway (exit M6W) in Barnum Woods

Moses announced during the opening of the Bethpage State Parkway in November 1936 that the land for extending the Meadowbrook from the Southern State Parkway to the Northern State Parkway had been acquired by Nassau County and plans for the road were being designed by the State Division of Highways. Moses stated that the funds would be requested at the next session of the New York State Legislature, with a completion date of 1939 to coincide with the opening of the 1939 World's Fair in Flushing, Queens. This would make it plausible for motorists to go from Flushing to Jones Beach State Park directly. The new extension would also alleviate congestion along several north–south highways in Nassau County and provide quicker access to Jones Beach. However, construction on the $10 million (1956 USD) highway was delayed until December 1953.

On October 13, 1956, Governor Averell Harriman officially opened the new extension of the Meadowbrook State Parkway with a ribbon-cutting ceremony at 11:30 a.m. near the Jerusalem Avenue overpass. Robert Moses, Hempstead Town Supervisor Edward Larkin, and Nassau County Executive Holly Patterson also attended the event. After the ceremony, a motorcade led by Moses traveled from the Northern State Parkway south to Roosevelt Field Shopping Center. At Roosevelt Field, the board chairman for Roosevelt Field, Inc., William Zeckendorf, honored Moses and Harriman with brand new tankards made of sterling silver.

=== Subsequent history ===
On July 5, 1962, the New York State Assembly announced the opening of bids on the widening of a 4.4-mile (7.1 km) section of the Meadowbrook between Merrick Road and the Southern State Parkway. Bids were to be accepted on the project in August, with a price tag of $3.851 million (1962 USD). The construction would widen the segment from four lanes to six and add a new center median. The widening was prompted by the frequency of accidents along the stretch, and efforts to develop the project were sped up as a result. Completion was set for 1964, and the reconstruction and repaving was finished on November 18, 1964.

The Westbury Interchange was given minor improvements in 1968.

In the early 1970s, the Mitchel Field Interchange was reconfigured to better serve the Nassau Hub area, which was being developed on the site of the former airfield by Nassau County.

In 1975, NYSDOT, which took control of the parkways from the LISPC, began demolishing some of the stations – including the Meadowbrook plaza, which ended up being one of the first buildings to go. The stations, which were once useful, would fork from the left lane into the median. However, according to NYSDOT, with the change in traffic patterns, the entrances to these stations became dangerous. By 1997, over two decades after demolition, the station site became a problematic place for people parking and walking up the Meadowbrook and Loop to fish on the bridges. According to the New York State Police, the site is legal for use as a repair stop or for emergencies. However, not for use of dropping people off for fishing, which is also illegal to fish from atop the bridge, except it is around and under the bridges.

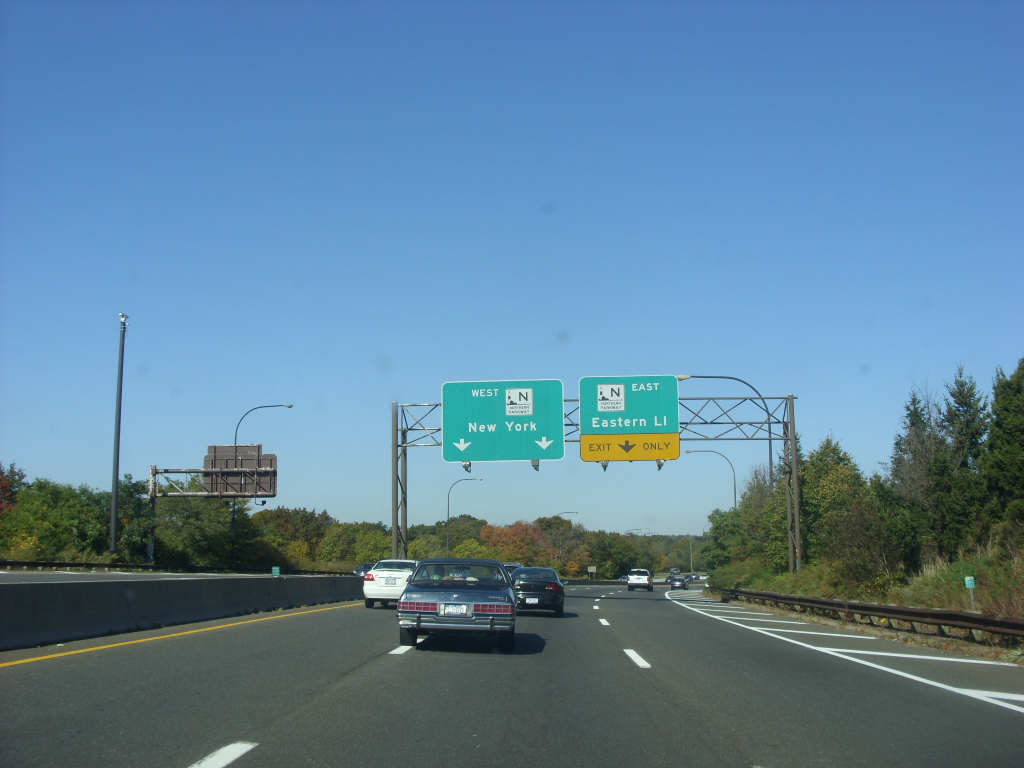
The Meadowbrook Parkway northbound, nearing the Westbury interchange.

In 1989, during a reconstruction project at the Westbury Interchange, a lawsuit was filed against NYSDOT by the Village of Westbury, regarding environmental impacts; the lawsuit claimed that NYSDOT did not follow proper environmental guidelines while designing the project because their environmental impact report failed to consider the impacts of a nearby future widening project on the Northern State Parkway. Construction began in May 1988, and the project was expected to be completed on October 31, 1991. It was proceeding on schedule until lawsuit was filed in February 1989. The Appellate Division of the New York State Supreme Court ruled on that NYSDOT had to provide a new environmental report by May 12 of that year or face having the reconstruction shut down. That December 19, the Court of Appeals announced their decision on the case of Village of Westbury v. Department of Transportation of the State of New York, et al., ruling in favor of Westbury. In its decision, the court stated NYSDOT should have issued a joint report for the interchange and widening projects because both projects improved the flow of traffic on the Northern State Parkway and were therefore related – although the widening portion of the project did not have a projected start date at the time the lawsuit was filed. The previous court's ruling was affirmed, and NYSDOT was advised to consider the environmental impacts of projects in the future on other, nearby projects. A settlement was eventually reached between NYSDOT and the Village of Westbury, allowing construction on the interchange to restart in February 1990; the reconstruction project was ultimately completed in 1991.

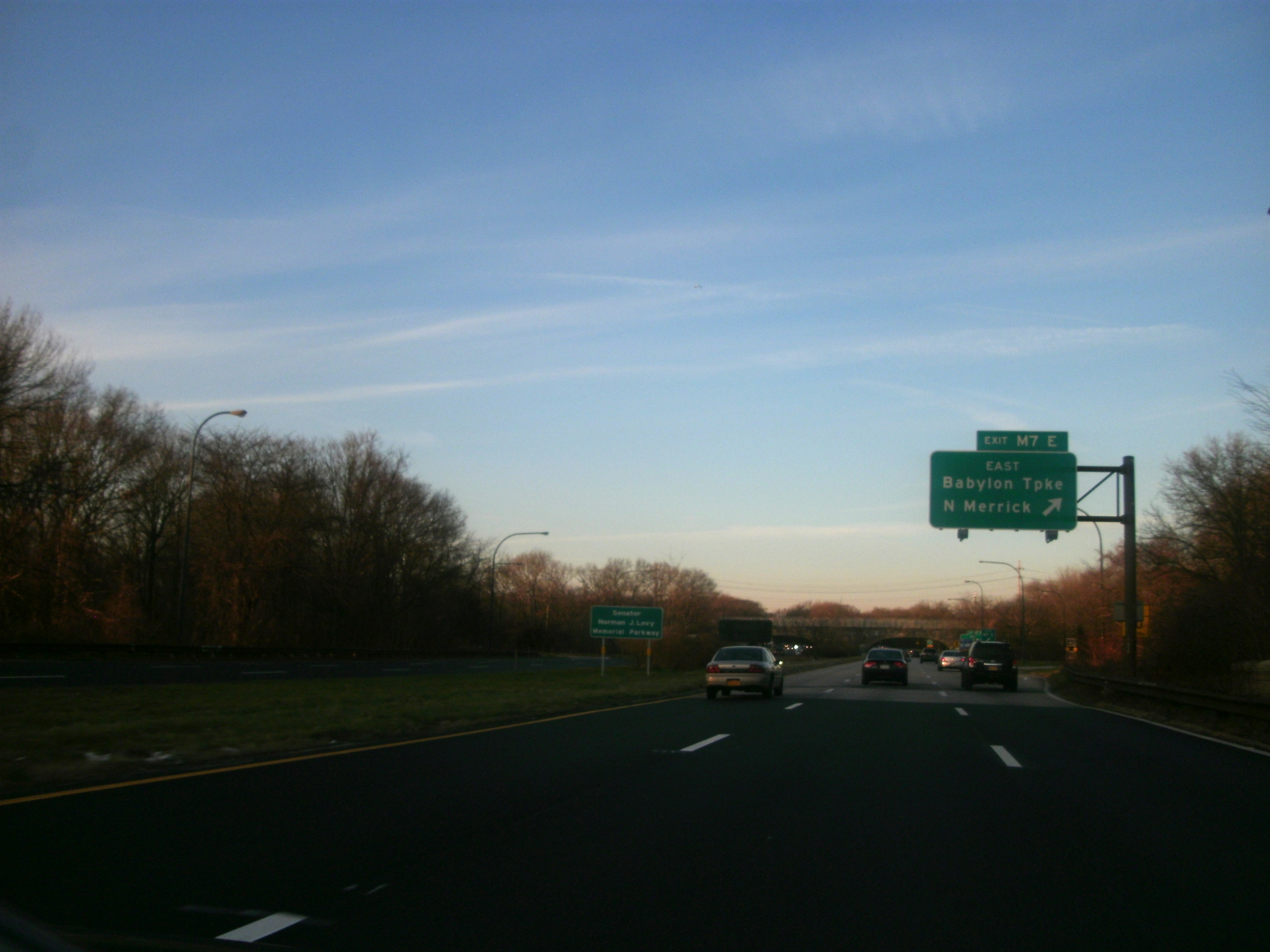
Signage denoting the State Senator Norman J. Levy Memorial Parkway designation just south of exit M7E on the northbound Meadowbrook

In August 1998, signs were installed along the Meadowbrook State Parkway dedicating the road in honor of State Senator Norman J. Levy, who died in February 1998 after brain surgery. Levy had served on the State Senate Transportation Committee since 1982 and sponsored the first seat belt law in the United States, and had also been part of the negotiations that helped work resume on the Meadowbrook–Northern State interchange. The new signs were unveiled in a ceremony in the median of the parkway just south of Merrick Road. Dignitaries at the honoring ceremony included then-Governor George Pataki, Senator Charles Fuschillo and Levy's widow, Joy Levy. Signs were erected at both ends of the Meadowbrook Parkway and at a point near the Babylon Turnpike interchange.

The Long Island Transportation Plan 2000, a study of how to handle Long Island traffic issues in 2020, was started in 1997 by engineers from NYSDOT. The preferred alternative in the study would widen several parkways on the island, inserting high-occupancy vehicle lanes (HOV lanes) for buses and carpools. The Meadowbrook would receive a new HOV lane between the Southern and Northern state parkways, while everything south of the Southern State Parkway would remain the same. The Northern State Parkway would get lanes from the Long Island Expressway to the Meadowbrook, and the Southern State would get lanes from the Meadowbrook to the Sunrise Highway.

In 2005, the portions of the Meadowbrook south of the Southern State Parkway – along with several other Long Island parkways – were listed on the National Register of Historic Places, as part of a historic district, known as the Jones Beach State Park, Causeway and Parkway System.

In October 2008, Nassau County Legislator David Denenberg demonstrated with ten civic leaders in front of the NYSDOT building in East Meadow about the slow progress of construction on the NY 102 (Front Street) overpass. Construction was causing rush hour traffic to back up for miles near the Hempstead Turnpike (NY 24) exit, and evidence showed no work had been done for several months. After residents and commuters started demanding answers, NYSDOT stated that a project that began as just basic bridge repair had become a larger-scale project that required a redesign due to the fact that the bridge had more damage than initially realized.

In 2022, it was announced that a modernization project would be undertaken on the Westbury Interchage. The $3.8 million project would mitigate bottlenecks on Glen Cove Road and Jericho Turnpike. One such feature added as part of this project was a raised median barrier on Glen Cove Road to prevent illegal turns from being made. Construction was underway by December of that year, continuing into 2023. The project was completed in late December 2023.

== Exit list ==
The entire route is in Nassau County.

Location	mi	km	Exit	Destinations	Notes
Jones Beach State Park	0.00	0.00	–	Ocean Parkway east	Continuation east
Jones Beach State Park	0.00	0.00	–	Bay Parkway – Energy & Nature Center, Northwell Health at Jones Beach Theater	
Jones Beach State Park	0.10– 0.40	0.16– 0.64	Bridge over Jones Bay		
Jones Beach State Park	1.30	2.09	Former Jones Beach fee booths (southbound only; closed 2017)		
Jones Beach State Park	1.10– 1.50	1.77– 2.41	M10	Loop Parkway – Point Lookout (NB) Loop Parkway – Long Beach (SB)	Northern terminus of Loop Parkway
Fundy Channel	1.50– 1.70	2.41– 2.74	Bridge		
Freeport Creek	2.75	4.43	Bridge		
Freeport	4.40	7.08	M9	Merrick Road – Merrick, Freeport	Signed as exits M9E (east) and M9W (west); former NY 27A; all trucks must use exit M9E
Freeport	4.57	7.35	M8	NY 27 – Merrick, New York	Signed as exits M8E (east) and M8W (west)
Freeport	5.10	8.21	M7	Babylon Turnpike – North Merrick, Roosevelt	Signed as exits M7E (east) and M7W (west)
North Merrick	6.81	10.96	M6	Southern State Parkway – Eastern Long Island, New York	Signed as exits M6E (east) and M6W (west); exits 22S-N on Southern State Parkway
Uniondale	8.99	14.47	M5	NY 24 east – East Meadow, Farmingdale (NB) NY 24 east – Farmingdale (SB)	
Uniondale	9.30	14.97	M4	NY 24 west – Uniondale, Hempstead, Coliseum	Access to Eisenhower Park and Museum Row
Uniondale	10.50	16.90	M3	Merchants Concourse / Stewart Avenue	Signed as exits M3E (Merchants Concourse) and M3W (Stewart Avenue)
Uniondale	11.28	18.15	M2	Zeckendorf Boulevard / Shopping Mall	Signed as exits M2E (Zeckendorf Boulevard) and M2W (Shopping Mall); access to Shopping Mall via Ring Road
Carle Place	11.68	18.80	M1	Old Country Road – Westbury, Mineola	Signed as exits M1E (east) and M1W (west) southbound
Carle Place	12.52	20.15	–	Northern State Parkway west – Eastern Long Island	Northbound exit and southbound entrance; exit 31A on Northern State Parkway west
Carle Place	12.52	20.15	–	Northern State Parkway east – New York	Northern terminus; exit 31A on Northern State Parkway east
1.000 mi = 1.609 km; 1.000 km = 0.621 mi: Closed/former; Incomplete access
