= Munson, New York =

- Hamlet
- Location on Long Island Location within the state of New York
- Coordinates: 40.69432°N 73.66753°W
- Country: United States
- State: New York
- County: Nassau
- Town: Hempstead
- Named for: Harry Munson
- Time zone: UTC-5 (Eastern (EST))
  - Summer (DST): UTC-4 (EDT)
- ZIP Codes: 11010 (Franklin Square); 11552 (West Hempstead)
- Area codes: 516, 363

Munson is a hamlet in the Town of Hempstead in Nassau County, on Long Island, in New York, United States. Although often now associated as being part of Franklin Square and West Hempstead, the name lives on through the local fire department.

Prior to May 1895, the area was known as Washington Square.

== History ==
The community is named for Harry Munson, who was a prominent local and a veteran of the Civil War; Munson had moved to the area in 1891. The name was chosen when the residents wanted the United States Postal Service to open a local post office. Like Franklin Square, the area was known for some time as Washington Square, and like what happened in Franklin Square some twenty years prior when residents there wanted a post office, the USPS refused so long as the name had "Washington" in it, in order to avoid confusion with all of the other places in New York with Washington in their names.

In May 1895, residents met to resolve the issue by choosing a new name. They chose the name Munson as the community's new name in honor of Munson; the other name proposals were Burnside and Talmageville. The name was soon made official, and the United States Postal Service opened the Munson Post Office a few months later, in August 1895.

In 1907, the first fire department in Munson, the Franklin Hook and Ladder Co. #1, was established. In 1925, the fire company merged with the Franklin Square Hose & Chemical Company. The merger led to the creation of the Franklin Square and Munson Fire Department, which serves the area to this day.

== Services ==
=== Fire ===
Munson is served by the Franklin Square and Munson Fire Department.

=== Police ===
Munson is served by the Nassau County Police Department's 5th Precinct.

== See also ==
- Hagerman, New York – A similar hamlet in the Town of Brookhaven in Suffolk County, slightly to the east.
- Locust Grove, New York
- North Woodmere, New York
- Strathmore, New York
