= Wantagh State Parkway =

Highway on Long Island, New York

Wantagh State Parkway
- Wantagh State Parkway highlighted in red

Route information
- Maintained by NYSDOT and NYS OPRHP
- Length: 13.33 mi (21.45 km)
- Existed: August 4, 1929–present
- History: First section opened August 4, 1929; Full length completed on December 17, 1938
- Restrictions: No commercial vehicles north of exit W5E

Major junctions
- South end: Ocean Parkway at Jones Beach
- NY 27 in Wantagh; Southern State Parkway in North Wantagh; NY 24 in Levittown
- North end: Northern State Parkway in Westbury

Location
- Country: United States
- State: New York
- Counties: Nassau

Highway system
- New York Highways; Interstate; US; State; Reference; Parkways

The Wantagh State Parkway is a 13.33-mile (21 km) controlled-access parkway on Long Island, New York, in the United States. It links the Ocean Parkway in Jones Beach State Park with the Northern State Parkway in Westbury. The parkway is located approximately 30 miles (48 km) east of Manhattan and 14 miles (23 km) east of the Nassau–Queens border.

One of the earliest Long Island parkways, construction on the Wantagh Parkway began in 1927, with the initial 5-mile (8 km) segment opening two years later as the Jones Beach Causeway, connecting Merrick Road in Wantagh to newly opened Jones Beach State Park.

The parkway is inventoried by the New York State Department of Transportation (NYSDOT) as New York State Route 908T (NY 908T) – an unsigned reference route.

== Route description ==
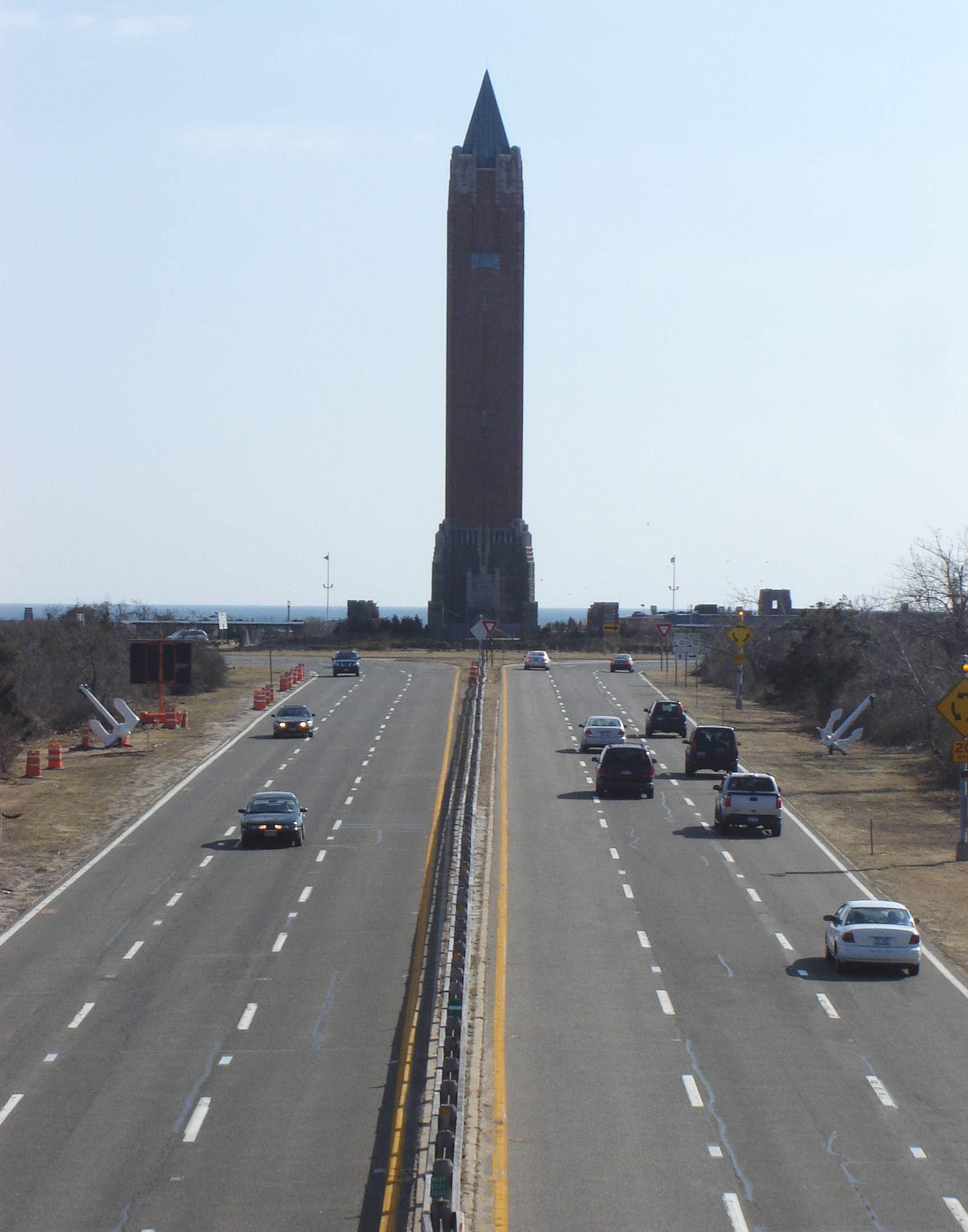
Approaching Jones Beach on the Wantagh State Parkway south.

The Wantagh State Parkway begins at a traffic circle with the Ocean Parkway in Jones Beach State Park just north of the Atlantic Ocean shoreline. The parkway proceeds northward as a six-lane freeway, passing several of the park's parking fields. It then crosses under Bay Parkway and the Detective Betsy Horner Miller Cutrone Memorial Bridge, before bending northeast into an unnumbered interchange with the Bay Parkway. The parkway then widens to eight lanes as it bends northeast through Jones Beach State Park, intersecting with several u-turn ramps between directions. As the parkway makes a large bend to the northwest, it gains elevation and narrows to five lanes, and then crosses over Sloop Channel by way of the Sloop Channel Bridge. The Wantagh State Parkway then lands on Green Island, bending slightly to the northeast and running across the island. Upon reaching the north end of Green Island, the parkway crosses Goose Creek by way of the Goose Creek Bridge, landing on Great Island.

Still consisting of five lanes, the Wantagh State Parkway continues north across Great Island before bending northwest at the island's northern end. It then proceeds northwest over Seaman's Creek by way of the Seaman's Creek Bridge, on the north end of which the parkway finally lands on Long Island. After crossing onto Long Island, the parkway enters the hamlet of Wantagh, with Wantagh County Park on its west side Cedar Creek County Park on its east side. It soon enters downtown Wantagh where it is flanked on both sides by residential neighborhoods and side streets, soon reaching exit W6. Exit W6 serves as an interchange between the Wantagh and Merrick Road (CR 27). The Wantagh Parkway then crosses over Merrick Road, turning northwest and widening to six lanes. The parkway then bends back to the northeast, running along the eastern edge of Millpond County Park towards exit W5, which connects the parkway to NY 27 (Sunrise Highway).

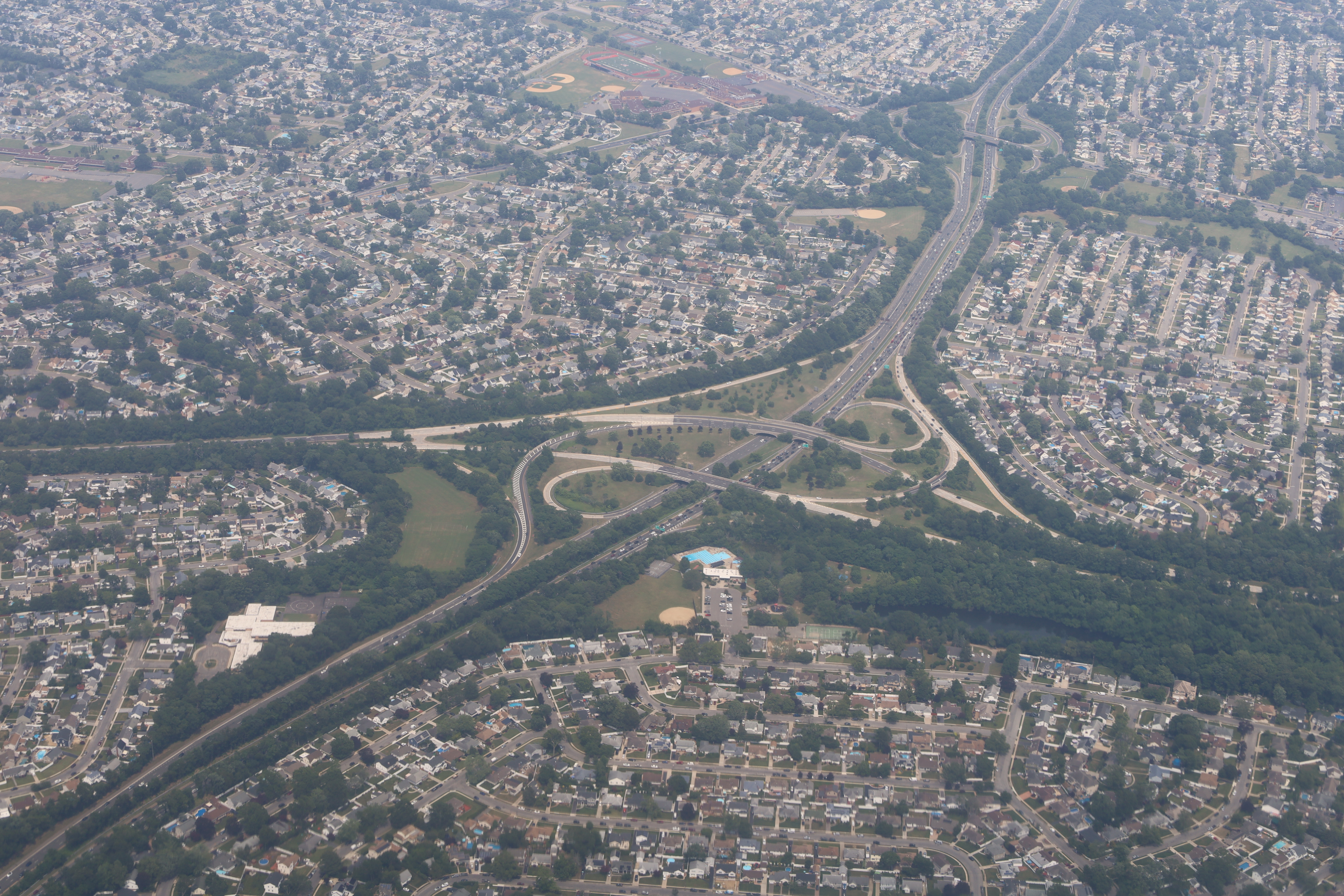
The interchange between the Wantagh State Parkway and the Southern State Parkway in 2021

After the ramps for exit W5 W, the Wantagh State Parkway continues north through Wantagh, crossing underneath the Babylon Branch of the Long Island Rail Road. The parkway, now running along the eastern edge of the Twin Lakes Preserve, passes Seaman Pond as it bends northwest into the Forest Lake section. The parkway passes a large pet cemetery and Wantagh High School before crossing under NY 105 (Jerusalem Avenue). After NY 105, the parkway bends northeast once again, entering exit W4, which connects to the Southern State Parkway. After the Southern State, Wantagh continues north, narrowing down to four lanes through the community of North Wantagh. The parkway then continues northwest, crossing under North Jerusalem Road and leaving North Wantagh.

Now running along the border between East Meadow and Levittown, the Wantagh State Parkway passes west of McLaren Memorial Park and continues northeast into an interchange with NY 24 (Hempstead Turnpike), where the parkway becomes four undivided lanes. A short distance later, the parkway crosses under NY 106 (Newbridge Road). The parkway bends north before briefly entering the hamlet of Hicksville in the Town of Oyster Bay. In the Town of Oyster Bay, the parkway soon reaches exit W2 – the parkway's interchange with Old Country Road (CR 25); it then immediately leaves the Town of Oyster Bay and enters the hamlet of New Cassel in the Town of North Hempstead. After exit W2, the Wantagh State Parkway continues northwest, soon crossing over the Main Line of the Long Island Rail Road. The parkway then proceeds northwest, soon entering the Incorporated Village of Westbury and reaching exit W1, which is a trumpet interchange with the Northern State Parkway's exit 33. This interchange serves as the northern terminus of the Wantagh, as its northbound lanes merge into the Northern State.

Many have erroneously referred to the Loop Parkway as the Jones Beach Causeway, most notably in Mario Puzo's 1969 novel The Godfather.

== History ==
=== Early history ===
The original section of the parkway, known as the Jones Beach Causeway, opened on August 4, 1929, along with Jones Beach State Park, running from Merrick Road in Wantagh to Jones Beach Island. It was built specifically by Robert Moses and the Long Island State Park Commission to enable vehicular access to Jones Beach. The Wantagh Parkway was subsequently extended north to the Southern State Parkway in July 1932.

=== Extension to the Northern State Parkway ===
In February 1937, the Long Island State Park Commission announced the design of an extension of the Wantagh State Parkway north to an interchange with an extended Northern State Parkway in the Incorporated Village of Westbury. This new 9.5-mile (15.3 km) set of roadway, designated the "Northern–Wantagh State Parkway Extension", saw the Wantagh be extended north from the Southern State Parkway to the extended Northern State – as well and the Northern State to the trumpet interchange with the Wantagh. The plans called for the new road to open by 1939 to ensure that drivers would have easier access to Jones Beach State Park from the 1939 World's Fair at Flushing Meadows–Corona Park in Flushing, Queens. The new roadways were to have a total of eighteen stone faced bridges combined between the sections, with construction beginning in 1937. Work on landscaping and paving had commenced by 1938. On April 7, the LISPC announced that bids on the new extensions would open on April 20 for the new project, with the expectation that the erection of all at-grade structures associated with the project would be completed by the year's end.

On November 20, 1938, the LISPC announced at their headquarters in Babylon that the Wantagh Parkway's extension to the Northern State Parkway would open to traffic a month later. Although the $4.4 million (1938 USD) project was roughly $2.2 million over-budget, the construction and opening of the roadway was three months ahead of its slated 1939 completion date. The new roadway would be opened on December 17 and be attended by officials such as Herbert H. Lehman, J. Russell Sprague, Alfred Smith, and Robert Moses.

During the December 17 opening ceremony, 300 cars were lined up on the asphalt, which was designed to make night driving much easier over the concrete. Smith cut the ribbon, located on the Northern State Parkway portion of new extension in Westbury, about 500 yards (460 m) east of Glen Cove Road. After the ribbon was cut, the group traveled east along the new alignment of the Northern State through Westbury to the new Northern State–Wantagh Parkway Interchange, where they turned south onto the Wantagh. They then proceeded south along the Wantagh to the interchange with the Southern State.

New lights had been installed along the median of the parkways improve the lighting along the highways.

=== Unbuilt extensions & interchanges ===
A proposed extension to Interstate 495 (the Long Island Expressway) has been on the books since the late 1950s, for which the right-of-way was acquired. This extension of the Wantagh Parkway would proceed north from the interchange with the Northern State Parkway, soon reaching a cloverleaf interchange with Jericho Turnpike (NY 25). It would then continue north and enter the Incorporated Village of Old Westbury, soon reaching the Long Island Expressway, onto which it would merge in the vicinity of Powells Lane.

When the Seaford–Oyster Bay Expressway (NY 135) was planned, it was intended to have its southern terminus at the Jones Beach Causeway section of the Wantagh State Parkway, onto which it would merge. However, while the right-of-way was purchased for the extension, this extension of NY 135 was never constructed. Freeway stubs exist at the south end of the Seaford–Oyster Bay Expressway for this unbuilt extension.

== Exit list ==
The entire route is in Nassau County.

Location	mi	km	Exit	Destinations	Notes
Jones Beach; State Park	0.00	0.00	–	Ocean Parkway to Meadowbrook State Parkway north – Robert Moses Causeway, East Islip, Mineola	Roundabout; southern terminus
Jones Beach; State Park	0.50	0.80	–	Bay Parkway west – Theater, West End Beaches	Southbound exit and northbound entrance; eastern terminus of Bay Parkway
Jones Beach; State Park	1.45	2.33	Bridge over the Hudson Channel		
Green Island			–	Green Island Fishing Pier	Southbound exit and entrance
Green Island	1.90	3.06	Former Jones Beach fee booths (southbound only; closed 2017)		
South Oyster Bay	2.10– 3.40	3.38– 5.47	Jones Beach Causeway		
Wantagh	5.05	8.13	W6	Merrick Road – Seaford, Bellmore	Signed as exits W6E (east) and W6W (west) southbound; former NY 27A
Wantagh	5.75	9.25	W5	NY 27 – Montauk, New York	Signed as exits W5E (east) and W5W (west); access to Wantagh and Bellmore; all trucks must use exit W5E
North Wantagh	7.63	12.28	W4	Southern State Parkway – Eastern Long Island, New York	Signed as exits W4E (east) and W4W (west); exits 27S-N on Southern State Parkway
Levittown	9.65	15.53	W3	NY 24 – Farmingdale, Hempstead	Signed as exits W3E (east) and W3W (west); access to Levittown and East Meadow
Westbury	12.12	19.51	W2	Old Country Road – Hicksville, Westbury	Signed as exits W2E (east) and W2W (west)
Westbury	13.20	21.24	–	Northern State Parkway east – Hauppauge	Northbound exit and southbound entrance; exit 33 on Northern State Parkway
Westbury	13.20	21.24	W1	Brush Hollow Road – Westbury	Southbound exit and entrance
Westbury	13.33	21.45	–	Northern State Parkway west – New York	Northern terminus
1.000 mi = 1.609 km; 1.000 km = 0.621 mi: Closed/former; Incomplete access
