= Short Beach (New York) =

Beach in New York, United States

Coordinates: 40.589722°N 73.555833°W

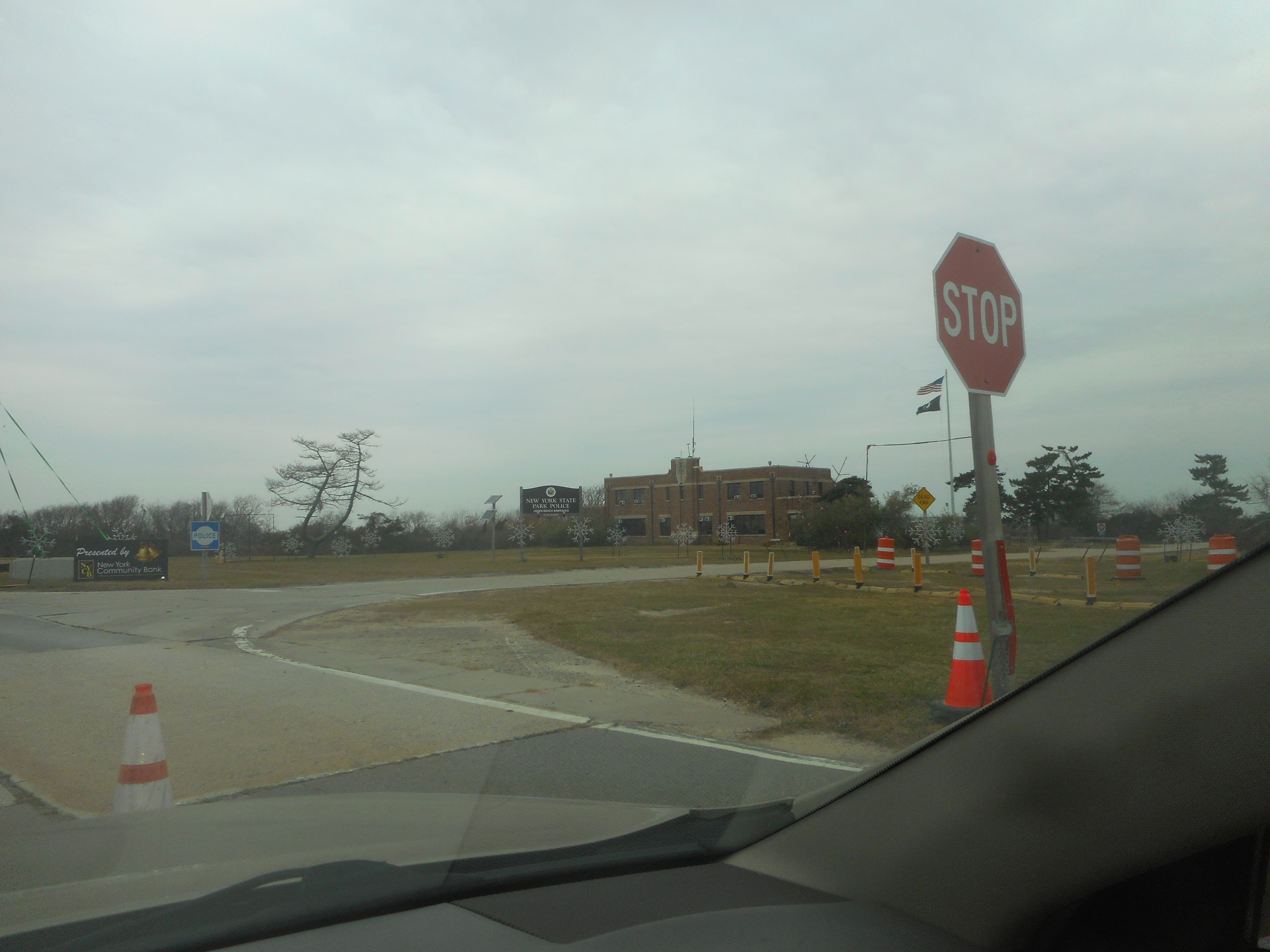
The New York State Park Police station on Short Beach as seen from Bay Parkway

Short Beach is the beach on the northern shore of the western end of Jones Beach Island.

== Description ==
The beach faces South Oyster Bay instead of the Atlantic Ocean, thereby providing some shelter from storm waves. Since 1851 it has been the home of a coastal lifesaving station operated (at first) by the United States Life-Saving Service and later by the United States Coast Guard. The current facility, Station Short Beach, typically does around 500 search and rescue missions each year —one of the busiest units in the Coast Guard's First District.

The Jones Beach State Park's West End Boat Basin is also on Short Beach. The Jones Beach West End barracks of the New York State Park Police is around 200 feet south of the Short Beach shoreline. An uninhabited islet, Short Beach Island, is usually just offshore, but occasionally connects to the beach when low tide exposes sandbars to the surface.
