= Loop Parkway =

Highway in Nassau County, New York

Loop Parkway
- Loop Parkway highlighted in red

Route information
- Maintained by NYSDOT
- Length: 2.65 mi (4.26 km)
- Existed: October 27, 1934–present

Major junctions
- West end: Lido Boulevard in Point Lookout
- East end: Meadowbrook State Parkway at Jones Beach

Location
- Country: United States
- State: New York
- Counties: Nassau

Highway system
- New York Highways; Interstate; US; State; Reference; Parkways

The Loop Parkway (also known as the Loop) is a 2.65-mile (4.26 km) controlled-access parkway in Nassau County, New York, in the United States. It serves the barrier islands south of Long Island itself, beginning on Long Beach Barrier Island at an intersection with Lido Boulevard in Point Lookout. From here, it heads generally east–west across Alder and Meadow islands to an interchange with the Meadowbrook State Parkway on Jones Island, a part of Jones Beach State Park located just north of Jones Beach Island. The islands served by the Loop Parkway are separated by narrow channels of water, all of which connect to Jones Inlet. The parkway is maintained by the New York State Department of Transportation (NYSDOT) and inventoried by the department as New York State Route 908C (NY 908C), an unsigned reference route.

The highway was built in 1934 as the Long Beach Loop Causeway, funded with money from the Reconstruction Finance Corporation. It was completed six months ahead of schedule and officially opened on October 27, 1934, by Robert Moses, then a candidate for Governor of New York, and New York City Mayor Fiorello LaGuardia. The plans to fund the highway included the implementation of tolls, which went into effect on January 2, 1935. These tollbooths, once considered the murder site of Sonny Corleone in Mario Puzo's The Godfather, were closed in 1978 as part of Governor Hugh Carey's efforts to establish that year's state budget.

== Route description ==
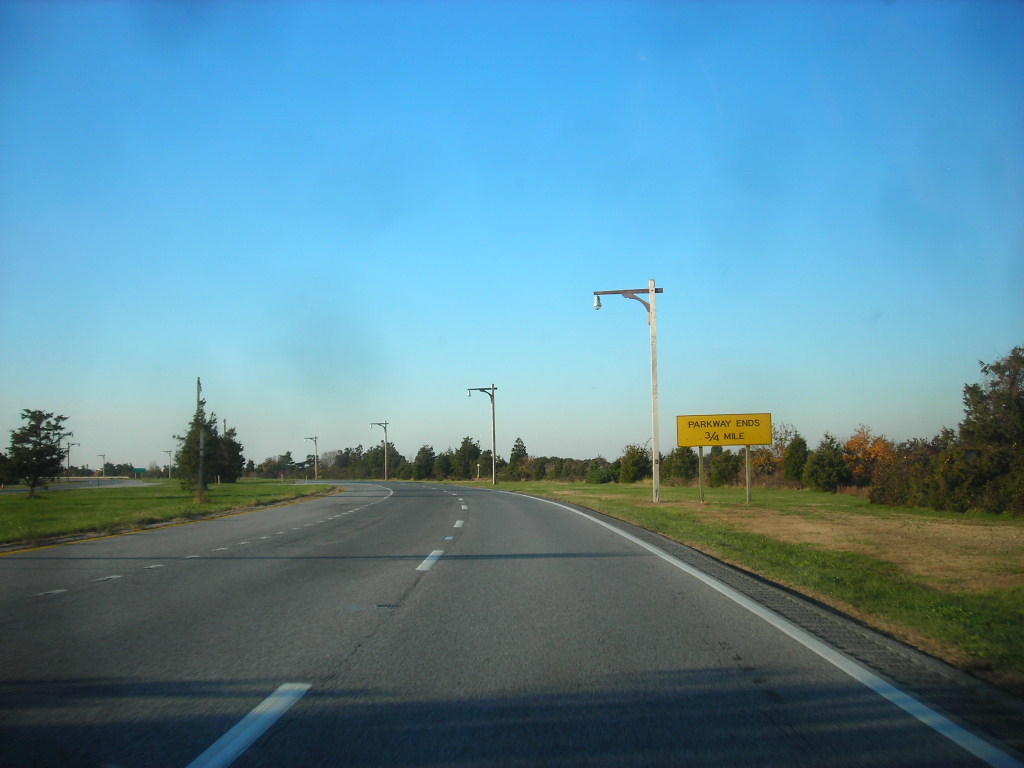
The Loop Parkway westbound approaching Lido Boulevard in Point Lookout

The Loop Parkway begins at an at-grade intersection with Lido Boulevard on the eastern end of Long Beach Barrier Island in the neighborhood of Point Lookout. It proceeds north as a four-lane divided highway, crossing over Reynolds Channel to reach Alder Island, one of several islands comprising Jones Beach State Park. Here, the road slowly bends eastward as it runs across the marshy island. Two U-turn ramps are built into the median near the western end of the island, serving as the only intersections or interchanges of any kind on Alder Island.

The Loop Parkway heads east from Alder Island, traversing Long Creek on a drawbridge leading to Meadow Island. The road quickly continues northeast across the island with no connections via interchanges or intersections.

At the eastern edge of the island, the highway reaches Swift Creek, another channel separating Meadow Island from Jones Island. The parkway crosses the waterway and immediately enters a trumpet interchange with the Meadowbrook State Parkway. The right-of-way of the Loop Parkway connects to and from the northbound direction of the Meadowbrook Parkway while two other ramps provide access to the southbound Meadowbrook Parkway. The Loop Parkway handled an average of 30,520 vehicles per day in 2011 according to estimates made by NYSDOT. Traffic along the highway has steadily increased since 2003, when the department recorded a daily average of 24,740 vehicles.

== History ==
=== Construction ===
The Loop Parkway, originally envisioned as the Long Beach Loop Causeway, was conceived as part the original design for the Long Island Parkway System, developed by Robert Moses and the Long Island State Park Commission (LISPC) in 1924. Moses wanted a parkway system to alleviate congestion on "unattractive" local roads. The system was designed to connect several parks that were under construction at the time, including Jones Beach State Park, Bethpage State Park and Sunken Meadow State Park. In 1927, the parkway system was linked to parkways within New York City's boroughs of Brooklyn and Queens, and in 1929, Jones Beach State Park and the Ocean Parkway opened, providing access to the mainland via the Jones Beach Causeway (now part of the Wantagh State Parkway).

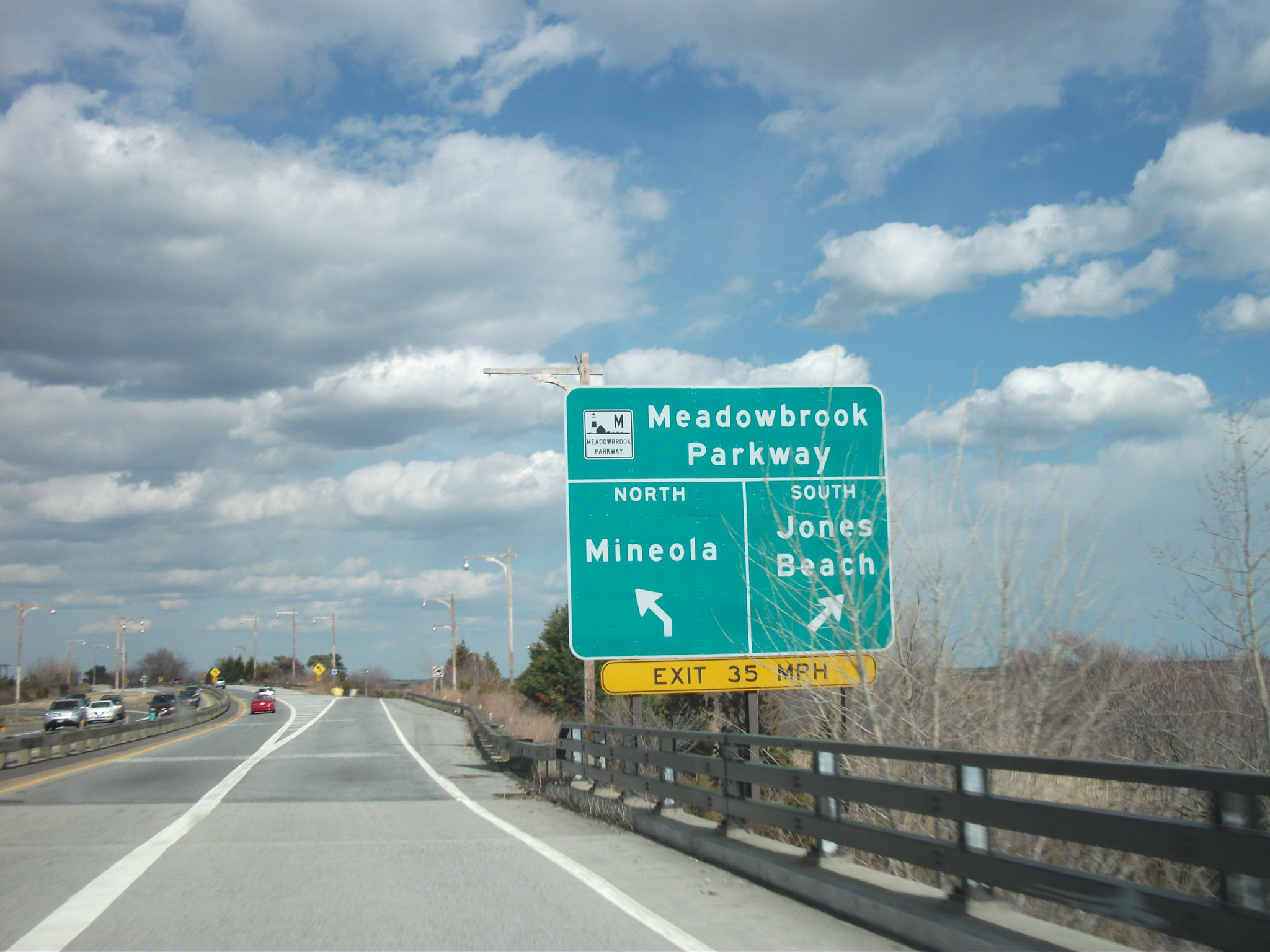
The Loop Parkway eastbound at the junction with the Meadowbrook in Freeport

In May 1933, construction began on the Meadowbrook State Parkway and the Long Beach Loop Causeway. It was financed by the Reconstruction Finance Corporation in Washington D.C., which loaned $5,050,000 (1933 USD) to the LISPC for the new parkways. It was proposed that the loan would be repaid in 25 years. The two highways would be connected by way of a trumpet interchange on Jones Island, with a total of 10,100,000 cubic yards (7,700,000 m^{3}) of hydraulic fill was used to build both parkways, and a new channel for boats heading to South Oyster Bay was constructed as part of the projects. The roadway of the 2.5-mile (4.0 km) Loop Causeway would be made of macadam pavement and be 44 feet (13 m) wide and help connect mainland Long Island to Jones Beach and Long Beach.

Both roadways were expected to be completed by January 1, 1935. They were ultimately completed in October 1934, six months ahead of schedule. The Long Beach Loop Causeway was opened to extreme fanfare on October 27, 1934, as was the Meadowbrook State Parkway with parades celebrating the event were held in Freeport and Rockville Centre, and they were attended by Robert Moses, at the time a candidate for Governor of New York, and Fiorello LaGuardia, the Mayor of New York City.

=== Tolls ===
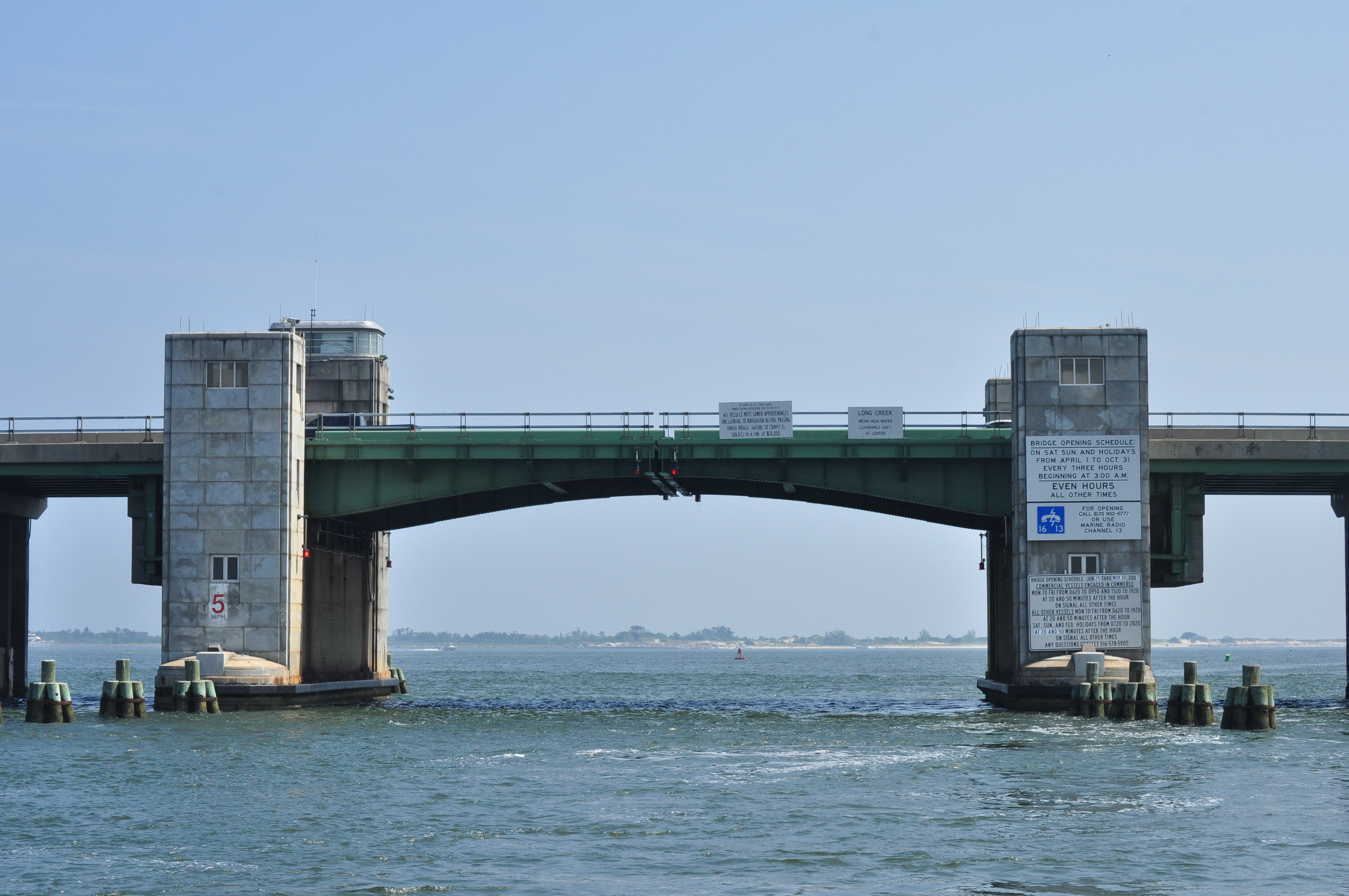
Long Creek Bridge

When the Jones Beach State Park Authority was given the loan by the Reconstruction Finance Corporation in March 1933, a toll was planned for both the Meadowbrook Causeway and the Long Beach Loop Causeway to help repay the loan. Tollbooths were constructed, and a 25-cent toll (equivalent to $6 in 2024) went into effect on both roadways on January 2, 1935. On that day, the supervisor with the LISPC reported that 300 people used the highway.

In 1975, the Jones Beach Parkway Authority increased the toll on the Southern State Parkway to 25 cents, while the Loop Parkway retained its 25 cent toll. The change faced immediate criticism from the New York State Legislature, and the Democratic members tried to rescind the toll hike. The power Robert Moses still had in a deal with the State of New York made sure that only his authority could choose when to raise and rollback tolls. However, the deals never prohibited the state from buying out the bonds the authority had themselves and thus take over the roads maintained by the Jones Beach Parkway Authority. Governor Hugh Carey had yet to craft the $12 billion state budget for 1978, and he proposed a deal to forgo the $24 million debt that the agency had accumulated and eliminate the toll on the Loop Parkway by taking over the roads.

After the governor and his department decided that the state could do without the $3.8 million that the toll would produce each year, a bill permitting the state to take over the Loop Parkway was passed on March 31, 1978. The removal of the tolls helped Governor Carey gain enough support to pass that year's state budget. The decision to eliminate the Loop Parkway tolls was influenced by Long Beach Supervisor Hannah Komanoff, who also unsuccessfully fought to have the tollbooth on the Atlantic Beach Bridge removed in 1979.

== Popular culture ==
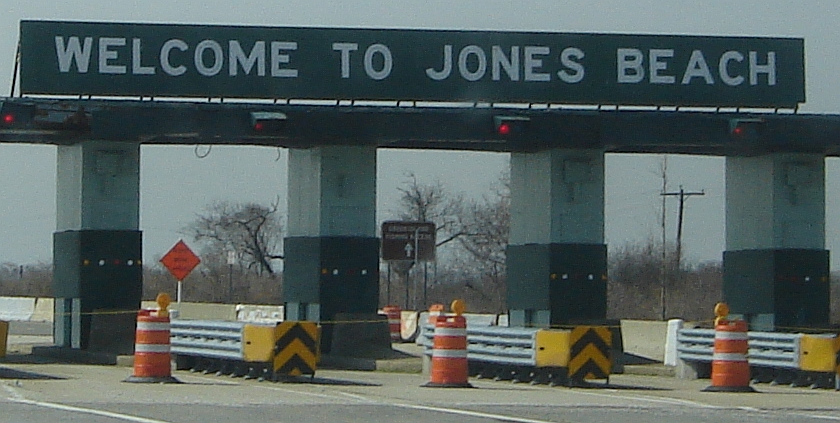
The tollbooths on the Wantagh State Parkway, where Sonny Corleone was supposedly murdered

In Mario Puzo's 1969 novel, The Godfather, Sonny Corleone was in the process of running to go and settle a years-long dispute with Carlo Rizzi when he drove his 1941 Lincoln Continental across Jones Beach from the Wantagh State Parkway (mentioned as the Jones Beach Causeway) towards the "causeway that would take him over the water from Long Beach". However, when Corleone approached the toll on the Jones Beach Causeway, the toll-taker fumbled his money and soon two men approached him with guns along with a fake toll-taker from another booth. All three men shot Corleone and flew back via car to the Meadowbrook State Parkway and into Long Beach via the Loop Parkway. A common misconception is that the murder occurred on either the Loop or the Meadowbrook parkways; however, the book specifies that the event occurred at the tollbooth on the Wantagh State Parkway. Some of Puzo's descriptions in this scene in the novel contradict one another (for example, there was never an outbound toll on the Wantagh), so it is possible Puzo either had forgotten the exact layout of the road system, or simply remade it in his own liking for the sake of the narrative.

== Exit list ==
The entire route is in Nassau County.

Location	mi	km	Destinations	Notes
Point Lookout	0.00	0.00	Lido Boulevard – Point Lookout, Long Beach	Western terminus; at-grade intersection
Reynolds Channel	0.15	0.24	Bridge	
Long Creek	1.50	2.41	Drawbridge	
Jones Beach State Park	2.65	4.26	Meadowbrook State Parkway – Mineola, Jones Beach	Eastern terminus; exit M10 on Meadowbrook State Parkway
1.000 mi = 1.609 km; 1.000 km = 0.621 mi: Incomplete access
