= County Route C83 (Nassau County, New York) =

- Franklin Avenue
- CR C83 (Franklin Avenue), highlighted in red

Route information
- Maintained by NCDPW
- Length: 3.31 mi (5.33 km)

Major junctions
- South end: Hempstead Avenue (CR D09), Hendrickson Avenue (CR D12), and South Franklin Avenue (CR D28) in North Lynbrook
- Southern State Parkway in North Valley Stream; Dutch Broadway (CR C62) in Franklin Square; Corona Avenue (CR C47) in Franklin Square
- North end: NY 24 and New Hyde Park Road (CR 5B) in Franklin Square

Location
- Country: United States
- State: New York
- County: Nassau

Highway system
- County routes in New York; County Routes in Nassau County

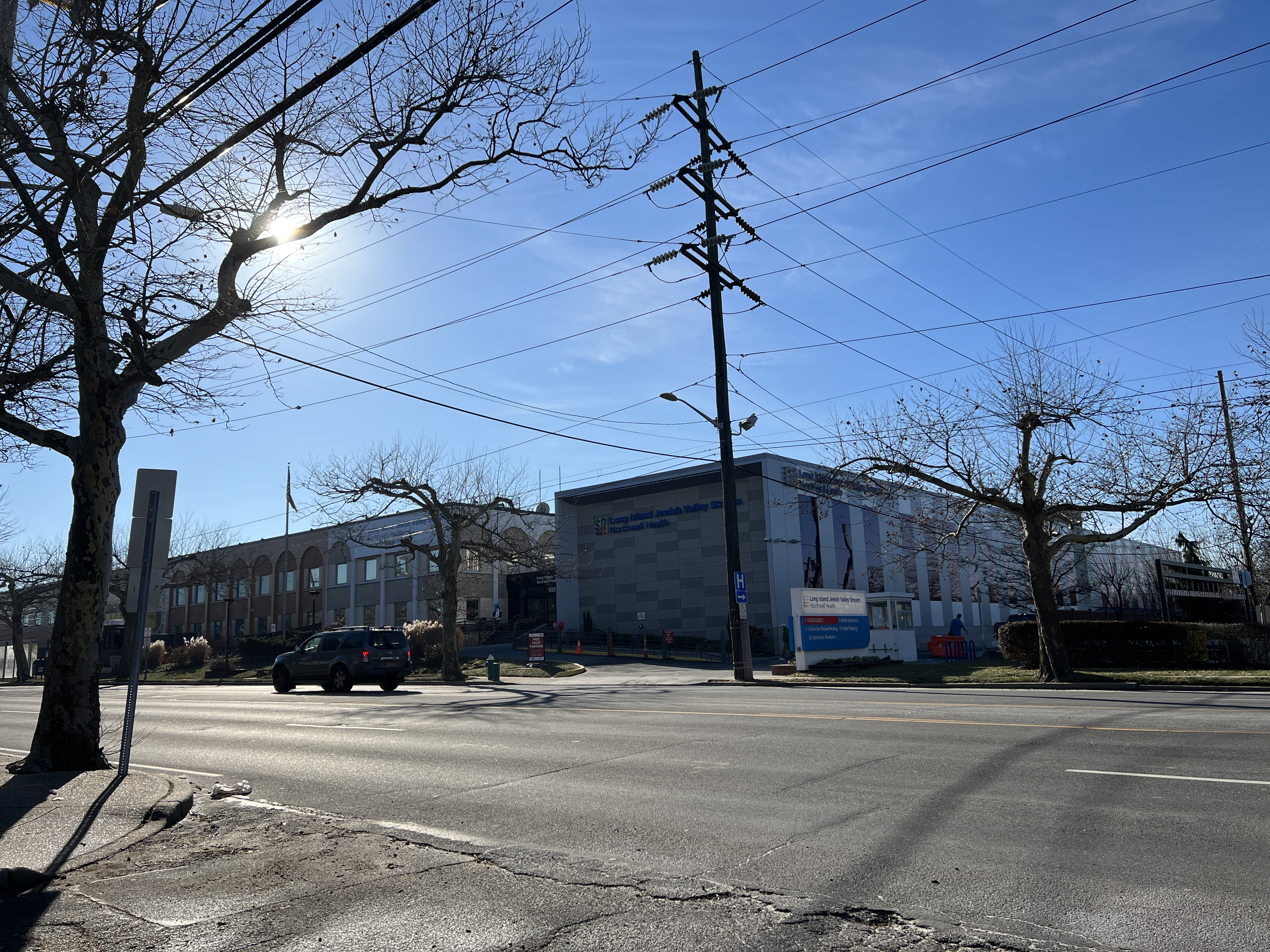
CR C83 in front of LIJ Valley Stream Hospital in North Valley Stream, in 2022

Nassau County Route C83 (known more commonly by the road's name, Franklin Avenue) is a major, 3.31-mile (5.33 km) county road linking North Lynbrook and Franklin Square within the Town of Hempstead, in Nassau County, New York, United States.

The road, in its entirety, is owned by Nassau County and maintained by the Nassau County Department of Public Works.

What is now CR C83 was formerly part of County Route 5, along with the road's northern continuation, New Hyde Park Road (CR 5B).

== Route description ==
CR C83 begins in North Lynbrook, at an intersection with Hendrickson Avenue (CR D12) and Hempstead Avenue (CR D09). From there, it travels north-northwest, passing Whitehall Street (CR E61) before curving to the northwest and crossing the Long Island Rail Road's West Hempstead Branch at-grade, entering Malverne. It then, soon thereafter, intersects Wagg Avenue, thence curves towards the west-northwest and enters Valley Stream. It then passes Wheeler Avenue before curving back towards the northwest and entering North Valley Stream. The road then continues towards the north, eventually passing Long Island Jewish Valley Stream Hospital before interchanging with – and crossing above – the Southern State Parkway.

North of its crossing over the Southern State Parkway, Franklin Avenue enters Franklin Square and soon intersects Dutch Broadway (CR C62) before reaching an intersection with Corona Avenue (CR C47), at which point CR C83 curves towards the north-northeast, continuing to First Avenue. From there, CR C83 continues north-northeast to Hempstead Turnpike (NY 24), where the CR C83 designation ends; Franklin Avenue continues north from this intersection as New Hyde Park Road (CR 5B).

CR C83 – in its entirety – is classified as a minor arterial highway by the New York State Department of Transportation and is eligible for federal aid.

== History ==
In the 1970s, Franklin Avenue became one of the first county roads in Nassau County to receive computerized traffic signals. These new, modern signals were installed to improve traffic flow and ease congestion along the roadway, which had been notorious for its traffic.

=== Route number and shield ===
Former route shield for Franklin Avenue (CR 5)

Beginning in 1959, when the Nassau County Department of Public Works created a numbered highway system as part of their "Master Plan" for the county highway system, Franklin Avenue was originally designated as part of County Route 5, with New Hyde Park Road. This route, along with all of the other county routes in Nassau County, became unsigned in the 1970s, when Nassau County officials opted to remove the signs as opposed to allocating the funds for replacing them with new ones that met the latest federal design standards and requirements stated in the federal government's Manual on Uniform Traffic Control Devices.

Subsequently, CR 5 was split into two, discontinuous segments, with CR 5A being assigned to a separate Franklin Street/Avenue in the villages of Hempstead and Garden City (formerly part of CR 6) and CR 5B being assigned to New Hyde Park Road; the Franklin Avenue between North Lynbrook and New Hyde Park Road in Franklin Square, meanwhile, would not be included as part of CR 5B and would instead receive the CR C83 designation.

== Major intersections ==
Location	mi	km	Destinations	Notes
North Lynbrook	0.00	0.00	Hempstead Avenue (CR D09), Hendrickson Avenue (CR D12), and South Franklin Avenue (CR D28)	
Malverne	0.31	0.50	Wagg Avenue	
North Valley Stream	1.49	2.40	Park Drive	Access to eastbound Southern State Parkway
Franklin Square	1.60	2.57	Dutch Broadway (CR C62)	
Franklin Square	1.77	2.85	Corona Avenue (CR C47)	
Franklin Square	2.33	3.75	First Avenue	
Franklin Square	3.31	5.33	NY 24 – New York, East Farmingdale; New Hyde Park Road (CR 5B)	At-grade intersection; becomes New Hyde Park Road (CR 5B) at the north side of the intersection
1.000 mi = 1.609 km; 1.000 km = 0.621 mi: Incomplete access

== South Franklin Avenue ==
South Franklin Avenue (also known as Lakeview Avenue Spur) is a short, 0.06-mile (0.097 km) spur off Franklin Avenue in North Lynbrook, New York, linking the intersection of Franklin Avenue (CR C83), Hendrickson Avenue (CR D12), and Hempstead Avenue (CR D06) with Lakeview Avenue (CR D28). It is owned by Nassau County and maintained by the Nassau County Department of Public Works as part of the unsigned Nassau County Route D28, with Lakeview Avenue.

South Franklin Avenue was formerly designated as part of CR 5, prior to the route numbers in Nassau County being altered – much like Franklin Avenue, itself.

== See also ==
- List of county routes in Nassau County, New York
- Covert Avenue
- Elmont Road
