= Stewart Avenue (Nassau County, New York) =

Major road in Nassau County, New York

- Stewart Avenue, showing county-maintained (red), village-maintained (blue), and former (black) sections

Route information
- Maintained by NCDPW, VFP DPW, and VGC DPW
- Length: 7.40 mi (11.91 km)

Major junctions
- West end: Stewart Street at the Floral Park–New Hyde Park border
- Covert Avenue (CR C52) at the New Hyde Park–Stewart Manor line New Hyde Park Road (CR 5B) in Garden City; Nassau Boulevard (CR D66) in Garden City; Rockaway Avenue in Garden City; Cherry Valley Avenue in Garden City; Hilton Avenue in Garden City; Franklin Avenue (CR 5A) in Garden City; Washington Avenue (CR 7A) in Garden City; Clinton Road (CR 1) in Garden City; Meadowbrook State Parkway in East Garden City; Merrick Avenue (CR 4) at the East Garden City–East Meadow line Salisbury Park Drive in Salisbury; Carman Road (CR C30) at the Salisbury–Levittown line
- East end: NY 106 in Hicksville

Location
- Country: United States
- State: New York
- County: Nassau

Highway system
- County routes in New York; County Routes in Nassau County

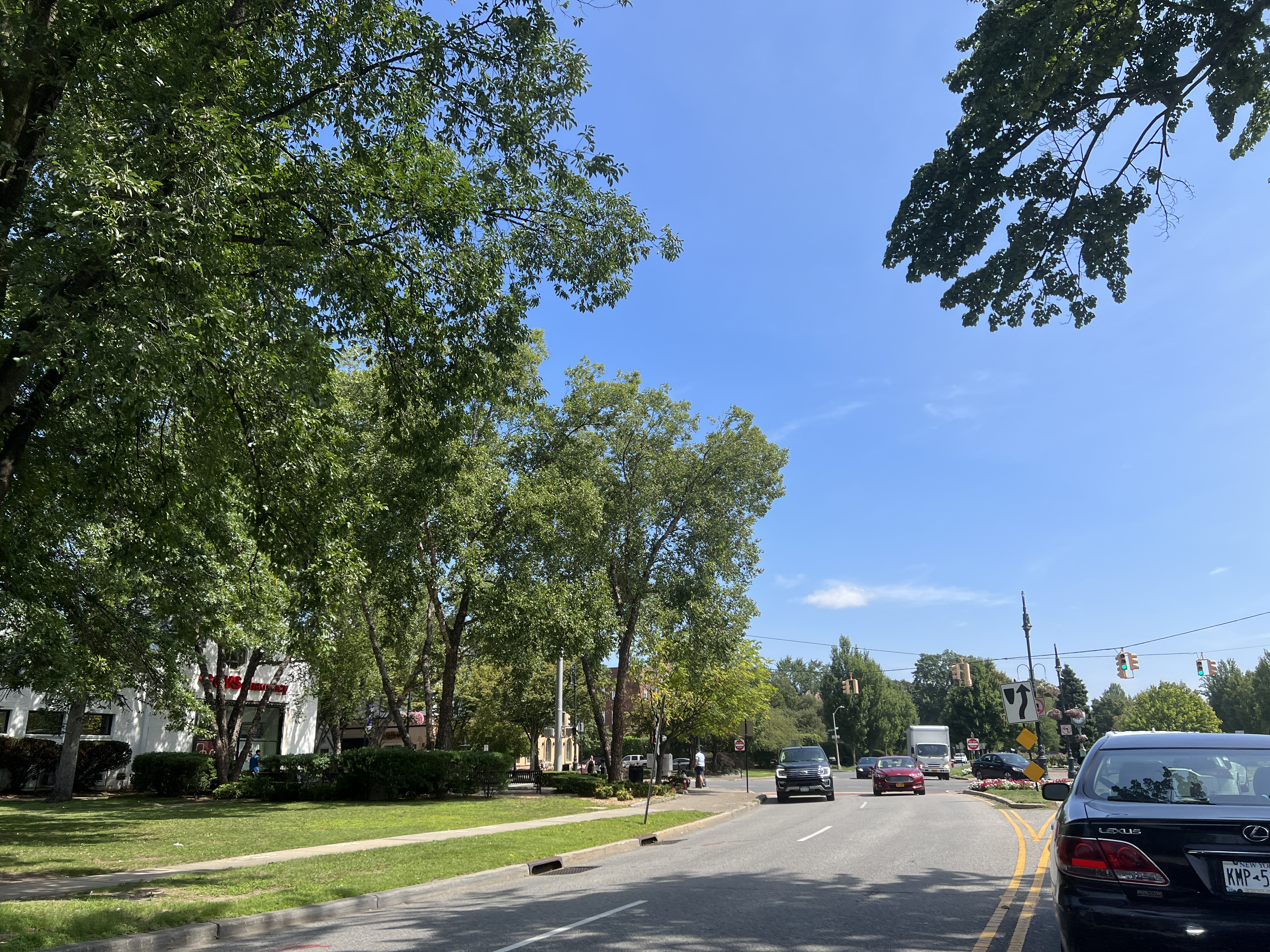
Stewart Avenue in Garden City in 2023

Stewart Avenue is a major, 7.40-mile (11.91 km) road in three discontiguous segments, linking the Village of Floral Park with the Village of Garden City and hamlet of East Meadow – along with the hamlet of Salisbury with the hamlet of Hicksville – within the towns of Hempstead and Oyster Bay, in Nassau County, New York, United States.

Colloquially known as Stewart, the western part of the road runs from the Floral Park–New Hyde Park border at its western end, to Garden City at its eastern end. The middle part runs from Garden City's downtown to Merrick Avenue (CR 4) and Park Boulevard at Eisenhower Park – at the border between East Meadow and the East Garden City section of Uniondale – at its eastern end. The eastern part, meanwhile, runs from Salisbury Park Drive (CR E15) in Salisbury to Newbridge Road (NY 106) in Hicksville.

The portions of the road between Covert Avenue (CR C52) and Cherry Valley Avenue – and from Clinton Road (CR 1) to CR 4 – are owned by Nassau County and maintained by the Nassau County Department of Public Works, as the unsigned Nassau County Route 177, while the entirety of the road east of the park is designated as the unsigned Nassau County Route E32. All other portions of the road are maintained by either the Village of New Hyde Park or the Village of Garden City.

== Route description ==
=== Western segment (Floral Park – Garden City) ===
==== West of Covert Avenue ====
Stewart Avenue begins as a residential street at the border between the villages of Floral Park and New Hyde Park, as an eastern continuation of Stewart Street. It runs 0.33 miles (0.53 km) east, eventually reaching its intersection with Covert Avenue (CR C52) at the border between the villages of New Hyde Park and Stewart Manor, where the maintenance of the road shifts from the Village of New Hyde Park to the County of Nassau, and the CR 177 designation begins.

==== Western segment of CR 177 ====
At its intersection with Covert Avenue (CR C52), Stewart Avenue becomes a county-maintained highway and the CR 177 designation starts. The road travels east from there through Stewart Manor, before entering the Village of Garden City and intersecting New Hyde Park Road (CR 5B). It then continues east through that village, eventually intersecting Clinch Road and thence Tanners Pond Road/Edgemere Road. Stewart Avenue continues straight and towards the east from there, passing several more residential streets and thence intersecting Nassau Boulevard (CR D66).

Continuing east from its intersection with Nassau Boulevard, Stewart Avenue eventually reaches its intersection with Rockaway Avenue (CR E06) upon reaching the east end of the Estates Section of Garden City. It then continues east one more block – along the northern perimeter of Garden City Middle School – to its intersection with Cherry Valley Avenue and Cathedral Avenue. This location marks the east end of the western segment of the road and of the CR 177 designation, with a one-block gap separating it from the eastern segment; the gap is made up via Cathedral Avenue, Seventh Street, and Hilton Avenue.

=== Middle segment (Garden City – East Meadow) ===
==== East of Hilton Avenue ====
The eastern segment of Stewart Avenue begins as a Village of Garden City-maintained road at Hilton Avenue, adjacent to the Garden City Hotel. it heads east from there, intersecting Franklin Avenue (CR 5A) in the heart of Garden City's downtown. It then continues east as a divided highway and as the main East–West thoroughfare through the eastern half of the village, passes the Mott Section of Garden City and eventually reaching Clinton Road (CR 1), where county ownership and maintenance – along with the CR 177 route designation – resume.

==== Eastern segment of CR 177 ====
Continuing east from Clinton Road, Stewart Avenue eventually enters the East Garden City section of unincorporated Uniondale, almost immediately intersecting with an entrance to Roosevelt Field Mall and thence with Quentin Roosevelt Boulevard (CR E01). From there, it continues east past Selfridge Avenue before reaching an intersection with Endo Boulevard/Merchants Concourse. Stewart Avenue then curves slightly to the east-southeast, passing over – and interchanging with – the Meadowbrook State Parkway, before reaching an interaction with Merrick Avenue (CR 4) and Park Boulevard (CR D82) at the East Garden City–East Meadow border; the middle segment of Stewart Avenue and the eastern segment of CR 177 both end at this location.

=== Eastern segment (CR E32) ===
At the east end of the park, the eastern part of Stewart Avenue begins at an intersection with Salisbury Park Drive (CR E32); this location marks the western end of the CR E32 designation. From this location, the road heads northeast through Salisbury, passing many residential streets before reaching Carman Avenue (CR C30) and entering Levittown. From there, Stewart Avenue veers towards the east, passing a few more residential streets before crossing into the Town of Oyster Bay and entering Hicksville.

Upon entering Hicksville, Stewart Avenue continues east, and it soon passes over the Wantagh State Parkway, before intersecting Abode Lane and thence Levittown Parkway. The road then passes the Dutch Lane Elementary School before curving slightly towards the east-southeast, passing Key Lane and thence Belfry Lane, before reaching its eastern terminus at Newbridge Avenue (NY 106) a short distance later; the intersection with NY 106 serves as the east end of both Stewart Avenue and of the CR E32 route designation.

== History ==
Stewart Avenue is named for Alexander Turney Stewart. Stewart was the founder and developer of Garden City, as well as the creator of the Central Railroad of Long Island.

The portion of Stewart Avenue between Hilton Avenue and CR 4 originally traversed what is now Eisenhower Park, connecting to the eastern segment of Stewart Avenue at that segment's intersection with Salisbury Park Road.

=== Route numbers and shields ===
Former CR 177 route shield

Beginning in 1959, when the Nassau County Department of Public Works created a numbered highway system as part of their "Master Plan" for the county highway system, the Nassau County-maintained portion of Stewart Avenue west of Cherry Valley Avenue was originally designated as County Route 175, the portion between Hilton Avenue and Eisenhower Park as CR 177, and the portion between Salisbury Park Drive and NY 106 as CR 111. This route, along with all of the other county routes in Nassau County, became unsigned in the 1970s, when Nassau County officials opted to remove the signs as opposed to allocating the funds for replacing them with new ones that met the latest federal design standards and requirements stated in the federal government's Manual on Uniform Traffic Control Devices.

Subsequently, Nassau County renumbered many of its county roads, with the county-maintained portions of Stewart Avenue west of Eisenhower Park being renumbered as Nassau County Route 177, while the portion between Hilton Avenue and CR 1 was transferred to the Village of Garden City and removed from Nassau County's highway system. Meanwhile, the entire road east of the park was renumbered as Nassau County Route E32.

== Major intersections ==
| Location | mi | km | Destinations | Notes |
|---|---|---|---|---|
| Floral Park–New Hyde Park line | 0.00 | 0.00 | Stewart Street | Continues west through Floral Park as Stewart Street |
| New Hyde Park–Stewart Manor line | 0.33 0.00 | 0.53 0.00 | Covert Avenue (CR C52) | Mileage resets; western terminus of western segment of CR 177 |
| Garden City | 0.43 | 0.69 | New Hyde Park Road (CR 5B) | |
| Garden City | 1.41 | 2.27 | Nassau Boulevard (CR D66) | |
| Garden City | 2.19 | 3.52 | Rockaway Avenue (CR E06) | |
| Garden City | 2.34 | 3.77 | Cherry Valley Avenue (CR C38) and Cathedral Avenue (CR C31) | Eastern terminus of the western segment of Stewart Avenue and the CR 177 route designation |
| Garden City | One-block gap in route | | | |
| Garden City | 0.00 | 0.00 | Hilton Avenue | |
| Garden City | 0.24 | 0.39 | Franklin Avenue (CR 5A) | |
| Garden City | 0.57 | 0.92 | Washington Avenue (CR 7A) | |
| Garden City | 1.03 0.00 | 1.66 0.00 | Clinton Road (CR 1) | Western terminus of the eastern segment of CR 177; mileage resets and county maintenance begins |
| Garden City–East Garden City line | 0.38 | 0.61 | Roosevelt Field | Access to Roosevelt Field Mall |
| East Garden City | 0.82 | 1.32 | Quentin Roosevelt Boulevard (CR E01) | |
| East Garden City | 1.52 | 2.45 | Endo Boulevard (CR C73/Merchants Concourse | Access to Meadowbrook State Parkway northbound via Merchants Concourse |
| East Garden City | 1.61 | 2.59 | Meadowbrook State Parkway – Jones Beach | Access to southbound Meadowbrook State Parkway only; access to Stewart Avenue from the Meadowbrook State Parkway via Merchants Concourse |
| East Garden City | 1.76 | 2.83 | Meadowbrook State Parkway – Carle Place | |
| East Garden City–East Meadow line | 2.02 | 3.25 | Merrick Avenue (CR 4) and Park Boulevard (CR D82) | Eastern terminus of middle segment of middle segment of Stewart Avenue and eastern terminus of the CR 177 route designation; access to Eisenhower Park via Park Boulevard |
Gap in route formed by Eisenhower Park; connection between middle and eastern segments of road severed
| Salisbury | 0.00 | 0.00 | Salisbury Park Drive | Western terminus of CR E32 route designation |
| Salisbury–Levittown line | 1.29 | 2.08 | Carman Avenue (CR C30) | |
| Hicksville | 1.68 | 2.70 | NY 106 (Newbridge Road) – Bellmore, Oyster Bay (hamlet) | Eastern terminus of CR E32 route designation |
1.000 mi = 1.609 km; 1.000 km = 0.621 mi: Incomplete access; Route transition

== See also ==
- List of county routes in Nassau County, New York
- Old Country Road
