= Foxhurst Road =

County highway in Nassau County, New York

County Route C82
- Foxhurst Road
- Foxhurst Road (CR C82), highlighted in red

Route information
- Maintained by NCDPW
- Length: 1.54 mi (2.48 km)

Major junctions
- West end: Long Beach Road (CR D39) in Oceanside
- Oceanside Road (CR D75) in Oceanside
- East end: Merrick Road (CR 27) and Grand Avenue (CR 55) in Baldwin

Location
- Country: United States
- State: New York
- County: Nassau

Highway system
- County routes in New York; County Routes in Nassau County

Foxhurst Road is a 1.54-mile (2.48 km) county road connecting Oceanside and Baldwin within the Town of Hempstead, in Nassau County, New York, United States.

Owned by Nassau County and maintained by the Nassau County Department of Public Works, the road is designated by the county as the unsigned Nassau County Route C82.

== Route description ==
Foxhurst Road begins at Long Beach Road (CR D39). It then continues east-southeast, soon reaching Oceanside Road (CR D75).

From Oceanside Road, Foxhurst Road continues east to Loftus Avenue. There, the road then turns towards the north-northeast, and soon thereafter, it reaches its intersection with Soper Avenue. The road then curves towards the northeast, eventually intersecting The Fenway in front of Silver Lake County Park, before continuing northeast to its terminus at Grand Avenue (CR 55) and Merrick Road (CR 27). Foxhurst Road and the CR C82 designation both end at this location, and the roadway continues north as Grand Avenue (CR 55).

Foxhurst Road – in its entirety – is classified as a major collector road by the New York State Department of Transportation and is eligible for federal aid.

== History ==
In the 1950s, a proposal was made by the Nassau County Department of Public Works to widen Foxhurst Road to four lanes. The project proposal caused a considerable amount of controversy amongst locals, who were concerned that such a project would make the road less safe and jeopardize the safety of local children.

In the 1970s, a 714-foot (218 m) portion of Foxhurst Road in Baldwin was realigned by Nassau County, in front of Silver Lake County Park. The project was carried out in order to improve safety along that section of the road. A sharp turn was located at the location, which presented a significant safety hazard to motorists on the road – especially for motorists traveling eastbound. As part of the project, the road was realigned, widened, and banked, coated with a skid-resistant asphalt, received new sidewalks, and improved drainage infrastructure was installed.

=== Route number and signage ===
Former CR 13 route shield used for Foxhurst Road

Beginning in 1959, when the Nassau County Department of Public Works created a numbered highway system as part of their "Master Plan" for the county highway system, Foxhurst Road was originally designated as County Route 13. This route, along with all of the other county routes in Nassau County, became unsigned in the 1970s, when Nassau County officials opted to remove the signs as opposed to allocating the funds for replacing them with new ones that met the latest federal design standards and requirements stated in the federal government's Manual on Uniform Traffic Control Devices.

Subsequently, Nassau County renumbered many of its county roads, with Foxhurst Road being renumbered as Nassau County Route C82.

== Major intersections ==
Location	mi	km	Destinations	Notes
Oceanside	0.00	0.00	Long Beach Road (CR D39)	Western terminus
Oceanside	0.25	0.40	Oceanside Road (CR D75)	
Oceanside	0.63	1.01	Loftus Avenue	
Oceanside	0.90	1.45	Soper Avenue	
Baldwin	1.29	2.08	The Fenway	Pedestrian access to Silver Lake County Park
Baldwin	1.54	2.48	Merrick Road (CR 27) and Grand Avenue (CR 55)	Eastern terminus; roadway continues north as Grand Avenue (CR 55)
1.000 mi = 1.609 km; 1.000 km = 0.621 mi

== See also ==
- List of county routes in Nassau County, New York
