= County Route 4 (Nassau County, New York) =

Road on Long Island, New York

- CR 4, highlighted in red

Route information
- Maintained by NCDPW
- Length: 9.94 mi (16.00 km)
- Existed: 1959–present

Major junctions
- South end: Merrick Road (CR 27) in Merrick
- North end: Wheatley Road (CR E60) in Old Westbury

Location
- Country: United States
- State: New York
- County: Nassau

Highway system
- County routes in New York; County Routes in Nassau County

County Route 4 is a major, 9.94-mile (16.00 km) county road connecting Merrick and Old Westbury, in Nassau County, on Long Island, New York. The unsigned, north-south county route consists of Merrick Avenue, Post Avenue, and Post Road.

CR 4, in its entirety, is owned by Nassau County and is maintained by the Nassau County Department of Public Works.

== Route description ==
=== Merrick Road to Old Country Road ===
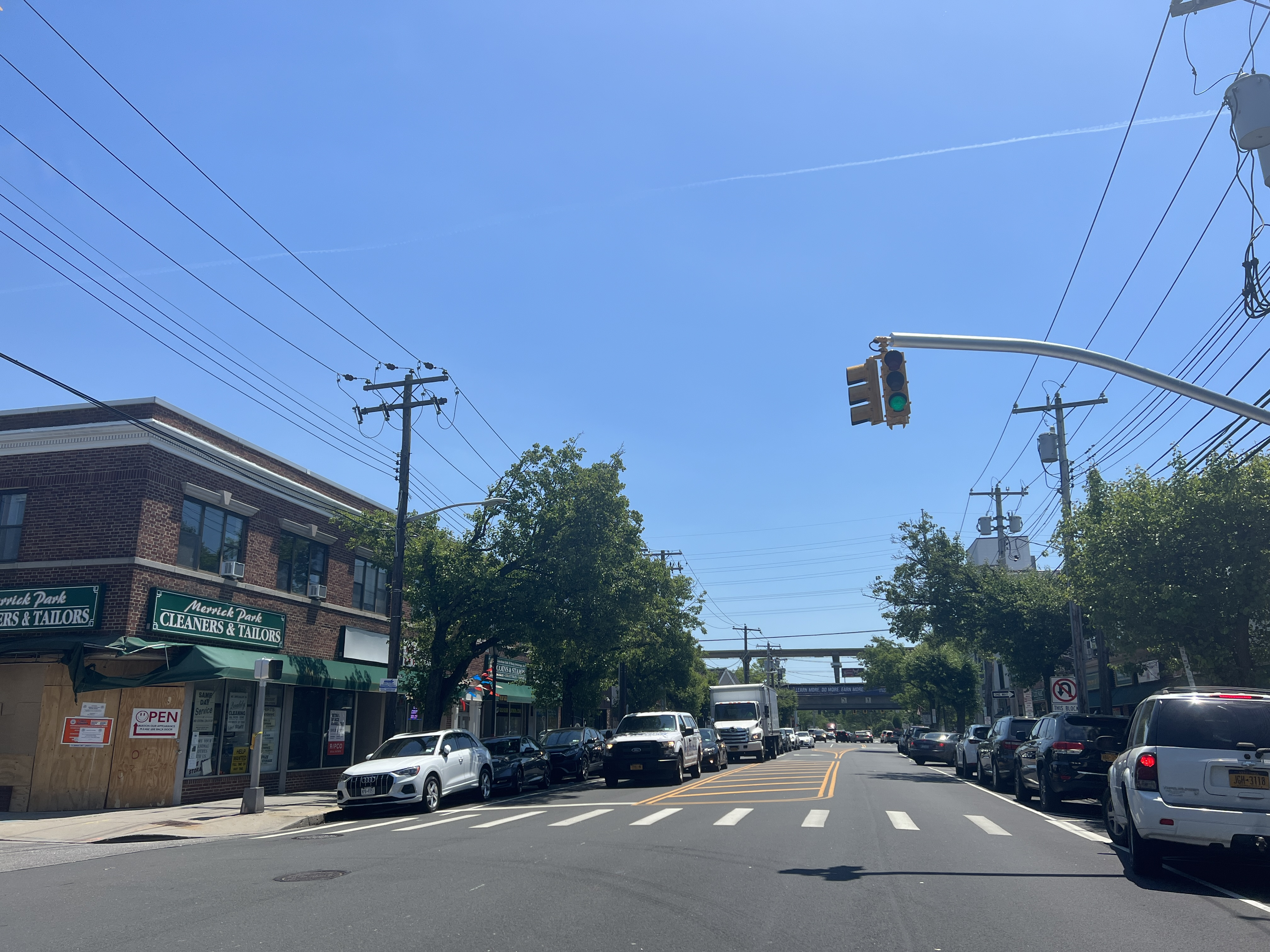
Merrick Avenue in Merrick's downtown in 2022.

County Route 4 begins at Merrick Road (CR 27) in Merrick. From there, it heads north-northwest, eventually intersecting Sunrise Highway (NY 27), before crossing underneath the Merrick station on the Long Island Rail Road's Babylon Branch and reaching Bedford Avenue. The road then continues north-northwest, passing the Chatterson School before intersecting Smith Street. It then continues north-northwest from there, soon intersecting Loines Avenue before passing Merrick Avenue Middle School, thence reaching Camp Avenue shortly thereafter, entering North Merrick. CR 4 then continues north-northwest, passes the Camp Avenue School, eventually reaching Old Mill Road before crossing over the Southern State Parkway, with which it interchanges via exit 24.

Just north of its interchange with the Southern State Parkway, CR 4 intersects with Jerusalem Avenue (CR 105), before continuing north-northeast and eventually reaching – and intersecting with – North Jerusalem Road (CR 181), at which point Merrick Avenue enters East Meadow. After this intersection, CR 4, still heading north-northwest, soon reaches a junction with Bellmore Avenue (CR 26), which merges into Merrick Avenue at this location. From there, County Route 4 continues north-northwest, intersecting with several local streets, before reaching its intersection with Front Street (NY 102). CR 4, north of this intersection, continues north-northwest, intersecting Glenn Curtiss Boulevard (CR C93) and thence reaching Hempstead Turnpike (NY 24) shortly thereafter – still running straight and towards the north-northwest.

North of Hempstead Turnpike (NY 24), CR 4 continues straight and towards the north-northwest, now forming the western boundary of Eisenhower Park and serving as a frontage road for the Meadowbrook State Parkway. It then reaches Charles Lindbergh Boulevard (CR C28) at the Mitchel Field Interchange (exit M4 of the Meadowbrook State Parkway). CR 4 continues north-northwest from this intersection, still along the border of Eisenhower Park and as the parkway's frontage road, until it reaches an intersection with Stewart Avenue (CR 177) and Park Boulevard (CR D82) – the latter of which is the main thoroughfare through Eisenhower Park; the Meadowbrook State Parkway curves towards the west at this location, away from Merrick Avenue. From here, CR 4 continues north-northwest along the western edge of Eisenhower Park, eventually intersecting Corporate Drive (CR C48), before reaching Old Country Road (CR 25) at the East Meadow–Westbury line (which, in turn, is also the boundary between the towns of Hempstead and North Hempstead); CR 4 continues north from here as Post Avenue.

=== Old Country Road to Wheatley Road ===
At the Old Country Road intersection, CR 4 veers towards the north-northeast, with Merrick Avenue becoming Post Avenue; this intersection marks the first major change in the CR 4's heading, with the road having followed roughly the same, straight heading between Merrick Road and Old Country Road. Now in Westbury, CR 4 continues north-northeast, passing the Cemetery of the Holy Rood and intersecting several local streets, before crossing underneath the Main Line of the Long Island Rail Road just west of the Westbury station, thence intersecting with Union Avenue (CR 63) on the north side of the underpass, now in downtown Westbury. North of this intersection, CR 4 continues north-northeast through Westbury's downtown as its main north-south thoroughfare, soon intersecting Maple Avenue (CR D44), thence intersecting several additional local streets before eventually reaching Wilson Avenue, at which point Post Avenue curves towards the northeast. Shortly after the intersection with Wilson Avenue, CR 4 crosses over the Northern State Parkway, with which Post Avenue interchanges via exit 32. After crossing over – and interchanging with – the Northern State Parkway, CR 4 reaches an intersection with Park Avenue and Advent Place, where it curves back towards the north-northwest. Shortly thereafter, Post Avenue intersects with Jericho Turnpike (NY 25) and enters Old Westbury; Post Avenue becomes Post Road at this location.

North of NY 25, CR 4 continues north through Old Westbury, passing Westbury High School and passing several estates, before winding its way around Old Westbury Pond and, shortly thereafter, intersecting the South Service Road of the Long Island Expressway (I-495). CR 4 then passes underneath the Long Island Expressway and, immediately thereafter, intersects the North Service Road (Store Hill Road). It then continues north, meandering through the area, and eventually reaches Wheatley Road (CR E60) – its northern terminus.

North of this intersection, CR 4 (Post Road) continues north as CR E60 (Wheatley Road).

== History ==
The former route shield for CR 4.

Like all of the other county routes in Nassau County, CR 4 became unsigned in the 1970s, when Nassau County officials opted to remove the signs as opposed to allocating the funds for replacing them with new ones that met the latest federal design standards and requirements, as per the federal government's Manual on Uniform Traffic Control Devices. When Nassau County first signed its highways in 1959, CR 4 continued north from its current terminus to Chicken Valley Road (CR C39) in Matinecock, via Wheatley Road (present-day CR E60) and Wolver Hollow Road (CR E65). The route was truncated to the intersection of Post Road and Wheatley Road following the removal of the signs, after which the route numbering system was overhauled.

In the 1960s, the Nassau County Department of Public Works reconstructed the Merrick Avenue section of CR 4 between Hempstead Turnpike and Old Country Road. When first announced in June 1960, the reconstruction project, which saw the 1.8-mile (2.9 km) segment of CR 4 be widened, was estimated to cost $750,000 (1960 USD).

In October 2017, the Long Island Rail Road replaced the original train bridge over Post Avenue. The old bridge, constructed during a 1914 rebuild of the Main Line through Westbury, had an 11-foot-10-inch (3.61 m) clearance; the bridge was hit by between five and nine high trucks per year between 2010 and 2016, causing numerous train delays in both directions. While the previous bridge was 103 years old, it was still considered to be in good condition. However, the bridge had to be replaced in preparation for the LIRR Third Track Project; the new span has a 14-foot (4.3 m) clearance and carries three tracks.

== Major intersections ==
Location	mi	km	Destinations	Notes
Merrick	0.00	0.00	Merrick Road (CR 27)	Southern terminus of CR 4 designation; continues south as a residential, town-owned street
Merrick	0.45	0.72	NY 27 (Sunrise Highway) – New York, Montauk	At-grade intersection; access to Merrick LIRR station
Merrick	0.68	1.09	Smith Street	
Merrick	0.85	1.37	Loines Avenue	
Merrick–North Merrick line	1.46	2.35	Camp Avenue	
North Merrick	2.41	3.88	Southern State Parkway – New York, East Islip	Cloverleaf interchange; exit 24 on the Southern State Parkway
North Merrick	2.52	4.06	Jerusalem Avenue (CR 105)	
North Merrick–East Meadow line	2.99	4.81	North Jerusalem Road (CR 181)	
East Meadow	3.57	5.75	Bellmore Avenue	
East Meadow	4.18	6.73	NY 102 (Front Street) – Hempstead Village, East Meadow	At-grade intersection
East Meadow	4.4	7.1	Glenn Curtiss Boulevard (CR C93)	
East Meadow	4.81	7.74	NY 24 (Hempstead Turnpike) – New York, East Farmingdale	At-grade intersection
East Meadow	5.31	8.55	Charles Lindbergh Boulevard (CR C28)	
East Meadow	5.81	9.35	Stewart Avenue (CR 177); Park Boulevard (CR D82)	Access to Eisenhower Park, via Park Boulevard
East Meadow–Westbury line	6.63	10.67	Old Country Road (CR 25)	Road name changes from Merrick Avenue to Post Avenue
Westbury	6.99	11.25	Union Avenue (CR 63)	Access to Westbury LIRR station
Westbury	7.69	12.38	Northern State Parkway – New York, Hauppauge	Diamond interchange; exit 32 on Northern State Parkway
Westbury–Old Westbury line	7.98	12.84	NY 25 (Jericho Turnpike) – New York, Orient Point	Road name changes from Post Avenue to Post Road; at-grade intersection
Old Westbury	9.14	14.71	LIE South Service Road (Store Hill Road)	Eastbound traffic only; access to I-495 at exit 40, via South Service Road
Old Westbury	9.21	14.82	North Service Road (Store Hill Road)	Westbound traffic only; access to I-495 at exit 39, via North Service Road
Old Westbury	9.94	16.00	Wheatley Road (CR E60)	Northern terminus of CR 4; road continues north as Wheatley Road (CR E60)
1.000 mi = 1.609 km; 1.000 km = 0.621 mi: Route transition

== See also ==
- List of county routes in Nassau County, New York
