= List of county routes in Nassau County, New York =

Example of a county route marker used by Nassau County for its county routes prior to the mid-1970s.

County routes in Nassau County, New York are maintained by the Nassau County Department of Public Works. Route numbers were originally posted in 1958 on unique blue-on-orange pentagonal route markers, which reflected the county's official colors; however, all county route signage was removed in the mid-1970s after the Federal Highway Administration enacted new standards for county route markers in 1973. The county legislature refused to allocate funds to replace the signs with new markers conforming to the federal government's Manual on Uniform Traffic Control Devices, leaving the routes unsigned. The route numbers are still used by the county for internal purposes only.

County route designations in Nassau County are of two types: some routes are numbered, while others feature a letter followed by a number for their designations.

== Numbered routes ==
Route numbers, lengths, and termini are derived from the New York State Department of Transportation's county road listing for Nassau County, unless otherwise noted.

Route	Length (mi)	Length (km)	From	Via	To	Notes
CR 1	7.72	12.42	Peninsula Boulevard (CR 2) in Hempstead	Clinton Street, Clinton Road, Glen Cove Road	North Hempstead-Oyster Bay border, Greenvale	Becomes NY 900B on the north side of the North Hempstead-Oyster Bay border. Formerly extended north to Centre Island Road in Centre Island and south to Lido Boulevard in Point Lookout.
CR 2	9.03	14.53	Bay Boulevard (CR 2A) / Rockaway Turnpike (CR 257) in Cedarhurst	Peninsula Boulevard	Fulton Street (NY 24/CR 107) in Hempstead	
CR 2A	0.15	0.24	Nassau Expressway (NY 878) in Inwood	Bay Boulevard	Peninsula Boulevard (CR 2)/Rockaway Turnpike (CR 257) in Cedarhurst	
CR 4	9.94	16.00	Merrick Road (CR 27) in Merrick	Merrick Avenue, Post Avenue, Post Road	Wheatley Road (CR E60) in Old Westbury	Formerly extended to Chicken Valley Road (CR C39) in Matinecock.
CR 5A	2.41	3.88	Front Street in Hempstead village	Franklin Avenue, North Franklin Street	Old Country Road (CR 25) in Garden City	Formerly part of CR 6.
CR 5B	4.39	7.07	Hempstead Turnpike (NY 24) in Franklin Square	New Hyde Park Road	I-495 exit 34 in North Hills	Formerly part of CR 5, prior to the modification of the route.
CR 7A	7.16	11.52	Peninsula Boulevard (CR 2) in Hempstead village	Washington Avenue, Roslyn Road, Main Street, Old Northern Boulevard	Old Northern Boulevard (CR D71) and West Shore Road (CR 15) in Roslyn	Formerly CR 7, travelling between Freeport and Glen Cove. Additionally, CR 7A overlaps with CR D71 at its northern end in Roslyn.
CR 7B	4.48	7.21	Broadway (CR C21) in Freeport	North Main Street, Nassau Road, Greenwich Street	Front Street in Hempstead village	Formerly CR 7, travelling between Freeport and Glen Cove. Additionally, CR 7A overlaps with CR D71 at its northern end in Roslyn.
CR 8	5.00	8.05	Old Country Road (CR 25) in Garden City	Herricks Road, Shelter Rock Road	NY 25A (Northern Boulevard) in Manhasset	
CR 9	6.09	9.80	South Broadway (NY 107) in Bethpage	South Oyster Bay Road, Jackson Avenue, Berry Hill Road	NY 25A (North Hempstead Turnpike) in Oyster Bay Cove	Formerly extended to West Main Street (CR E52) in Oyster Bay
CR 11	6.45	10.38	Jericho Turnpike (NY 25) in New Hyde Park	Lakeville Road, Middle Neck Road	Kings Point Road in Kings Point	Formerly included Redbrook Road.
CR 11A	1.35	2.17	I-495 Exit 33 in Lake Success	Community Drive	Northern Boulevard (NY 25A) and East Shore Road (CR E25) in Manhasset	Formerly extended from I-495 Exit 33 in Lake Success to Bayview Avenue in Great Neck.
CR 12	6.28	10.11	Cantiague Lane in Hicksville	West John Street, East Barclay Street, Woodbury Road	Suffolk County line in Woodbury	Formerly extended west to Roslyn Road (CR 7A) in Mineola.
CR 15	4.02	6.47	Old Northern Boulevard (CR D71; CR 7A) in Roslyn	West Shore Road, Beacon Hill Road	Port Washington Boulevard (NY 101) in Port Washington	Formerly extended west and north to Manorhaven via Main Street, Shore Road, Manorhaven Boulevard, and Orchard Beach Road.
CR 22	1.91	3.07	The Plaza in Atlantic Beach	Beech Street, Park Street	Long Beach city line at Nevada Avenue in East Atlantic Beach	
CR 25	11.34	18.25	Herricks Road (CR 8) at Rockaway Avenue in Garden City	Herricks Road, Old Country Road, Round Swamp Road	Round Swamp Road (CR 110) in Plainview	Overlaps with Round Swamp Road east to the Nassau–Suffolk County border.
CR 25S	0.11	0.18	Round Swamp Road (CR 110)	Old Country Road Connector in Plainview	Old Country Road (CR 25)	
CR 26	3.88	6.24	Merrick Road (CR 27) in Bellmore	Bellmore Avenue	Merrick Avenue (CR 4) in East Meadow	
CR 27	16.75	26.96	New York City (Queens) line at Hook Creek Boulevard in Valley Stream	Merrick Road	Suffolk County line in East Massapequa (becomes Montauk Highway)	Overlaps with NY 27A east of Carman Mill Road.
CR 55	4.46	7.18	Atlantic Avenue in Baldwin	Grand Avenue, Baldwin Road	Jerusalem Avenue (CR 105) in Hempstead	
CR 63	2.51	4.04	Post Avenue (CR 4) in Westbury	Union Avenue, Brush Hollow Road	Jericho Turnpike (NY 25) and Cantiague Rock Road (CR C29) in Jericho	
CR 75	1.04	1.67	Broadway (CR 22) in Lawrence	Doughty Boulevard	Burnside Avenue (CR C27) in Inwood	
CR 85	0.69	1.11	Railroad tracks at the East Williston–Williston Park village line	East Williston Avenue in East Williston	East Williston–Mineola village line	Entire length overlaps with NY 25B; formerly designated as CR 25B.
CR 101	2.79	4.49	Herricks Road (CR 8) in Herricks	Searingtown Road	NY 25A /NY 101 at the Flower Hill–Manhasset–Munsey Park–Roslyn Estates quadripoint	Historically known as Searington Road and Manhasset Avenue.
CR 105	4.16	6.69	Greenwich Street (CR 7B) in Hempstead village	Jerusalem Avenue	NY 105 / NY 106 in North Bellmore	
CR 106	1.30	2.09	NY 24 (Fulton Avenue) and CR 3 (Hempstead Avenue) in West Hempstead	Front Street	William Street in Hempstead village	Entire length overlaps with NY 102.
CR 107	0.9	1.45	Franklin Avenue (CR 5A) in Hempstead	Fulton Avenue	Truro Lane in Hempstead	Overlaps with NY 24; formerly designated CR 24.
CR 110	3.33	5.36	Quaker Meeting House Road (CR D99) in Old Bethpage	Round Swamp Road	Suffolk County line in Plainview	
CR 177	4.36	7.02	Covert Avenue (CR C52) in Stewart Manor	Stewart Avenue	Merrick Avenue (CR 4) in East Meadow	
CR 181	3.97	6.39	Jerusalem Avenue (CR 105) in North Merrick	North Jerusalem Road, Old Jerusalem Road	Wantagh Avenue (CR 189) in Wantagh	
CR 188	2.03	3.27	Southern State Parkway at the Roosevelt–Uniondale border	Uniondale Avenue in Uniondale	Hempstead Turnpike (NY 24)	
CR 189	5.25	8.45	Merrick Road (CR 27) in Wantagh	Wantagh Avenue	NY 107 in Bethpage	Formerly NY 115 from 1930 to July 1, 1972.
CR 231	3.91	6.29	Long Beach Boulevard in Long Beach	Park Street, Lido Boulevard	Parkside Drive in Point Lookout	
CR 257	1.45	2.33	Broadway (CR C22) in Lawrence	Rockaway Turnpike	New York City (Queens) line in Inwood	Formerly part of NY 104 from c. 1931 to c. 1933
CR 260	0.87	1.40	Meadowbrook State Parkway	Zeckendorf Boulevard in East Garden City (Uniondale)	Old Country Road (CR 25)	
CR 878T	0.57	0.92	Rockaway Turnpike (CR 257) in Inwood	Nassau Expressway Tem.	Burnside Avenue (CR C27) in Inwood	

== Lettered routes ==
This list of county routes (derived from the New York State Department of Transportation's county road listing for Nassau County) have designations that begin with a letter, followed by a number.

Route	Length (mi)	Length (km)	From	Via	To	Notes
CR C01	0.90	1.45	Bayview Avenue in Kings Point	Arrandale Avenue	Middle Neck Road in Great Neck	
CR C02	1.21	1.95	Main Street in East Rockaway	Atlantic Avenue	Merrick Road (CR 27) in Lynbrook	Formerly part of CR 3.
CR C03	2.51	4.04	Waukena Avenue in Oceanside	Atlantic Avenue	South Main Street in Freeport	Formerly part of CR 90.
CR C04	1.29	2.08	Main Street in East Rockaway	Atlantic Avenue	Long Beach Road in Oceanside	Formerly part of CR 10 and former NY 103.
CR C05	1.39	2.24	Long Beach Road in Island Park	Austin Boulevard	Long Beach Road in Barnum Island	
CR C06	0.81	1.30	New York City (Queens) line	Bates Road and Horace Harding Boulevard in Lake Success	Long Island Expressway (I-495) North Service Road	
CR C09	1.66	2.67	Cutter Mill Road in Great Neck Estates	Bayview Avenue	Arrandale Avenue (CR C01) in Kings Point	Formerly CR 43.
CR C10	1.87	3.01	Lattingtown village line in the Town of Oyster Bay	Bayville Avenue	Ludlam Avenue in Bayville	CR C11 continues southbound from CR C10's western terminus.
CR C11	2.15	3.46	Buckram Road in Locust Valley	Bayville Road	Oyster Bay town line in Lattingtown	CR C10 continues eastbound from CR C11's northern terminus.
CR C12	1.26	2.03	Ludlam Avenue in Bayville	Bayville Avenue & Centre Island Road	Centre Island village line in the Town of Oyster Bay	
CR C16	2.04	3.28	NY 25A (North Hempstead Turnpike) in Oyster Bay Cove	Berry Hill Road	Pine Hollow Road/Lexington Avenue/South Street in Oyster Bay	
CR C17 (1)	0.35	0.56	Round Swamp Road (CR 110)/Quaker Meeting House Road	Bethpage Road in Farmingdale	Main Street/Powell Place	Formerly part of CR 110.
CR C17 (2)	0.18	0.29	Piping Rock Road in Matinecock	Birch Hill Road	Forest Avenue in Locust Valley	Formerly part of CR 29.
CR C18	0.92	1.48	Peninsula Boulevard (CR 2) in Valley Stream	Branch Boulevard	Hungry Harbor Road in North Woodmere	Formerly CR 135.
CR C19	0.34	0.55	Mill Hill Road	Brewster Street in the City of Glen Cove	Cottage Row	
CR C21	0.37	0.60	North Main Street	Broadway in Freeport	North Columbus Avenue	
CR C22 (1)	5.20	8.37	Hempstead town line in Lawrence	Broadway	Merrick Road (CR 27) in Lynbrook	Formerly designated as CR 54.
CR C22 (2)	0.18	0.29	Central Avenue	Broadway in Bethpage	Bethpage Fire Department	Formerly part of CR 65.
CR C23 (1)	0.11	0.18	North Grove Street (CR D04)	Brooklyn Avenue in Freeport	North Main Street	
CR C23 (2)	1.10	1.77	Freeport Village line	Brookside Avenue North in Roosevelt	Nassau Road/Uniondale Avenue	
CR C24 (1)	0.31	0.50	Merrick Road (CR 27)	Brookside Avenue South in Freeport	NY 27 (Sunrise Highway)	
CR C24 (2)	0.83	1.34	Oceanside Road	Brower Avenue in Oceanside	Waukena Avenue	Formerly part of CR 90.
CR C25	0.37	0.60	Woodmere Boulevard (CR E68) in Hewlett Neck	Browers Point Branch Road	Woodmere Boulevard in Woodsburgh	
CR C26 (1)	1.85	2.98	Old Northern Boulevard (CR E65) in Roslyn	Bryant Avenue	Glen Cove Avenue (CR C91) in Roslyn Harbor	Formerly part of CR 7 and CR 183.
CR C26 (2)	0.64	1.03	Forest Avenue	Buckram Road in Locust Valley	Bayville Road	
CR C27	0.69	1.11	Doughty Boulevard (CR 75)	Burnside Avenue in Inwood	West Broadway (CR E51)	Formerly part of CR 10 and former NY 103.
CR C28 (1)	1.52	2.45	Quentin Roosevelt Boulevard	Charles Lindbergh Boulevard in East Garden City (Uniondale)	Merrick Avenue (CR 4)	
CR C28 (2)	0.78	1.26	Quentin Roosevelt Boulevard	Charles Lindbergh Boulevard West in East Garden City (Uniondale)	Earle Ovington Boulevard (CR C63)	
CR C28 (3)	0.24	0.39	Charles Lindbergh Boulevard West	Charles Lindbergh Boulevard Spurs in East Garden City (Uniondale)	Charles Lindbergh Boulevard	
CR C29	1.30	2.09	West John Street (CR 12) in New Cassel	Cantiague Rock Road	Jericho Turnpike (NY 25) in Jericho	
CR C30	2.49	4.01	Hempstead Turnpike (NY 24) in East Meadow	Carman Avenue, Carman Avenue Extension	Old Country Road (CR 25) in Salisbury	Formerly CR 36.
CR C31	1.59	2.56	Front Street (NY 102) in Hempstead village	Cathedral Avenue	Cherry Valley Avenue in Garden City	Formerly part of CR 62.
CR C32	0.52	0.84	Bayview Avenue (CR C09)	Cedar Drive in Great Neck Estates	Middle Neck Road (CR 11)	Formerly CR 76.
CR C33	0.43	0.69	Oyster Bay town line	Cedar Swamp Road in the City of Glen Cove	Long Island Rail Road	Formerly part of CR 107.
CR C34	1.25	2.01	Grand Avenue (CR 55) / DeMott Avenue (CR C57) westbound	Centennial Avenue West in Roosevelt	Babylon Turnpike (CR D11)	Formerly part of CR 23.
CR C35	1.34	2.16	Hicksville Road (NY 107) in Bethpage	Central Avenue	Thorne Drive in Plainedge	Formerly part of CR 186.
CR C36 (1)	2.48	3.99	Sunrise Highway (NY 27) in Valley Stream	Central Avenue, Linden Boulevard	New York City Line (Queens County Line) in North Valley Stream	Formerly part of CR 20.
CR C36 (2)	0.52	0.84	Shore Road (CR E25)	Central Drive in Baxter Estates	Main Street	Formerly CR 15A.
CR C37	0.42	0.68	Stewart Avenue	Cherry Avenue in Bethpage	Broadway	
CR C38	0.25	0.40	Rockaway Avenue (CR E06)	Cherry Valley Avenue in Garden City	Stewart Avenue (CR 177)	Formerly part of CR 84.
CR C39	3.37	5.42	Cedar Swamp Road (NY 107) in Old Brookville	Chicken Valley Road	Oyster Bay Road in Matinecock	
CR C43	0.34	0.55	Scudders Lane in Roslyn Harbor	Cody Avenue	Glenwood Road in Glenwood Landing	Formerly CR 115.
CR C44	0.08	0.13	Broadway	Columbus Avenue North in Freeport	Grand Avenue	
CR C45 (1)	0.59	0.95	Garden City village line	Commercial Avenue in East Garden City (Uniondale)	Railroad Avenue	
CR C45 (2)	0.05	0.08	Marjorie Lane	Compton Street in Bay Park	Waterview Street	
CR C46	0.28	0.45	Southern State Parkway overpasses	Cornwell Avenue in West Hempstead	Hempstead Avenue	
CR C47	1.77	2.85	Merrick Road (CR 27) in Valley Stream	Corona Avenue & Corona Avenue North	Franklin Avenue in Franklin Square	
CR C48 (1)	0.87	1.40	Zeckendorf Boulevard (CR 260)	Corporate Drive in Westbury	Merrick Avenue (CR 4)	
CR C48 (2)	0.23	0.37	Landing Road	Cottage Row in the City of Glen Cove	Brewster Street	Formerly part of CR 48, with Cottage Row.
CR C49	0.55	0.89	Eleventh Street (CR 70)	County Seat Drive in Garden City	Old Country Road (CR 25)	
CR C50	0.17	0.27	County Seat Drive (CR C49)	Court House Drive in Garden City	Washington Avenue (CR 7A)	
CR C51	0.98	1.58	Oyster Bay Town line	Cove Neck Road in Cove Neck	Sagamore Hill Road	Formerly part of CR 50.
CR C52 (1)	1.68	2.70	NY 24 in Elmont	Covert Avenue	NY 25 (Jericho Turnpike) in New Hyde Park	Formerly part of CR 174, with Meacham Avenue.
CR C52 (2)	0.02	0.03	NY 24	Covert Avenue Spur in Elmont	Covert Avenue	
CR C53	1.04	1.67	Shore Road (CR E25) in Port Washington	Cow Neck Road	Middle Neck Road (CR D55) in Sands Point	Formerly CR 45.
CR C54	1.32	2.12	Landing Road	Crescent Beach Road in the City of Glen Cove	Dead End	Formerly CR 69.
CR C55 (1)	0.63	1.01	Great Neck Road in Great Neck Estates	Cutter Mill Road	Middle Neck Road (CR 11) in Great Neck Plaza	Former CR 75.
CR C55 (2)	0.65	1.05	Hampton Road	Daly Boulevard in Oceanside	Long Beach Boulevard (CR D39)	Formerly part of CR 57.
CR C56	0.47	0.76	Woods Avenue	Davison Avenue in Oceanside	Brower Avenue	Formerly part of CR 90.
CR C57	1.74	2.80	North Village Avenue in Rockville Centre	DeMott Avenue	Grand Avenue (CR 55) / West Centennial Avenue (CR C34) eastbound in Roosevelt	Formerly part of CR 23, with Centennial Avenue.
CR C58 (1)	0.04	0.06	Main Street	Denton Avenue in East Rockaway	Atlantic Avenue	
CR C58 (2)	1.49	2.40	Cornwell Avenue in West Hempstead	Dogwood Avenue	Nassau Boulevard in Franklin Square	
CR C58 (3)	0.95	1.53	Jericho Turnpike (NY 25) in North New Hyde Park	Denton Avenue	Marcus Avenue in Garden City Park	Formerly CR 72.
CR C59 (1)	1.34	2.16	Forest Avenue	Dosoris Lane in the City of Glen Cove	Lattingtown Road	
CR C59 (2)	0.48	0.77	Forest Avenue	Dosoris Way in the City of Glen Cove	Walnut Road	
CR C60	2.51	4.04	Pearsall Avenue in the City of Glen Cove	Duck Pond Road	Oyster Bay Road in Matinecock	Formerly part of CR 30.
CR C62 (1)	2.38	3.83	New York City Line (Queens County Line) in Elmont	Dutch Broadway	Franklin Avenue in North Valley Stream	Formerly CR 100.
CR C62 (2)	1.95	3.14	Newbridge Road (NY 106) in North Bellmore	East Meadow Avenue	NY 24 in East Meadow	
CR C63 (1)	0.57	0.92	Hempstead Turnpike (NY 24)	Earle Ovington Boulevard in East Garden City (Uniondale)	Charles Lindbergh Boulevard (CR C28)	
CR C63 (2)	0.09	0.14	Charles Lindbergh Boulevard (CR C28)	Earle Ovington Boulevard Spur in East Garden City (Uniondale)	Earle Ovington Boulevard	
CR C64	1.00	1.61	Broadway in Hewlett	East Rockaway Road	East Rockaway Village line in Hewlett Harbor	Formerly part of NY 103 from c. 1931 to c. 1934; also formerly part of CR 10.
CR C65	0.76	1.22	Main Street (CR 7A)	East Broadway & Old Northern Boulevard in Roslyn	Northern Boulevard (NY 25A)	Follows the former alignments of Northern Boulevard (NY 25A), CR 25A, and CR 7C.
CR C66	1.38	2.22	NY 106 in Oyster Bay	East Main Street	Cove Neck Road (CR C51) in Oyster Bay Cove	Formerly part of CR 17.
CR C67	1.36	2.19	North Hempstead Town line in Thomaston	East Shore Road	Station Road in Kings Point	
CR C69	1.53	2.46	NY 106 in Muttontown	Eastwoods Road	Cold Spring Road in Syosset	Formerly CR 33.
CR C70 (1)	0.58	0.93	Hilton Avenue	Eleventh Street in Garden City	Washington Avenue	Formerly part of CR 84.
CR C70 (2)	0.04	0.06	Selfridge Avenue	Ellington Avenue East in Garden City	County maintenance ends / Town of Hempstead maintenance begins eastbound	
CR C70 (3)	0.11	0.18	County maintenance ends / Town of Hempstead maintenance begins westbound	Ellington Avenue West in Garden City	Selfridge Avenue	
CR C71	2.08	3.35	New York City Line (Queens County Line) in North Valley Stream	Elmont Road	Plainfield Avenue in Elmont	Formerly part of CR 99.
CR C73	0.20	0.32	Perimeter Drive in East Garden City (Uniondale)	Endo Drive	Stewart Avenue in Westbury	Access to Nassau Community College.
CR C74 (1)	0.09	0.14	North Gate Road	Fairview Avenue in Kings Point	Station Road (CR E30)	Formerly part of CR 79.
CR C74 (2)	0.10	0.16	Waterview Street	Fifth Avenue in Bay Park	East Rockaway Village line	
CR C75	0.95	1.53	Bayville Road in Lattingtown	Feeks Lane	Factory Pond Road in Mill Neck	Formerly CR 49
CR C76	0.31	0.50	Suffolk Lane	Fifteenth Street in Garden City	Franklin Avenue (CR 5A)	Formerly CR 146
CR C77	0.09	0.14	Williamson Street	Fifth Avenue in East Rockaway	Morton Avenue (CR D61)	Formerly part of CR 163
CR C78	0.85	1.37	Herricks Road (CR 8)	First Street in Mineola	Willis Avenue (CR E64)	
CR C79	2.04	3.28	Cottage Row in the City of Glen Cove	Forest Avenue	Buckram Road in Locust Valley	Formerly part of CR 16.
CR C81	0.16	0.26	Hempstead Town line	Fourth Avenue in East Rockaway	Morton Avenue	
CR C82	1.54	2.48	Long Beach Road (CR D39) in Oceanside	Foxhurst Road	Merrick Road (CR 27) Baldwin	Formerly CR 13.
CR C83	3.31	5.33	Hendrickson Avenue (CR D12) and Hempstead Avenue (CR D09) in North Lynbrook	Franklin Avenue	Hempstead Turnpike (NY 24) and New Hyde Park Road (CR 5B) in Franklin Square	Formerly part of CR 5.
CR C84	0.05	0.08	Morton Avenue (CR D61)	Front Street in East Rockaway	Bend on Front Street (CR C85)	Formerly part of CR 163.
CR C85	0.15	0.24	Bend on Front Street (CR C84)	Front Street in East Rockaway	Main Street (CR D42)	Formerly part of CR 163.
CR C87	1.50	2.41	North Jerusalem Road	Gardiners Avenue in Levittown	Hempstead Turnpike (NY 24)	Formerly part of CR 34.
CR C88	0.14	0.23	Carman Avenue (CR C30)	Gasser Avenue (Bob Reed Lane) in Salisbury	Salisbury Park Drive (CR E15)	Formerly CR 64A. Renamed Bob Reed Lane in 2003.
CR C89	0.92	1.48	Prospect Avenue (CR E25)	Glen Avenue in Sea Cliff	Glen Cove Avenue (CR C91)	Formerly CR 67.
CR C90	2.47	3.98	Duck Pond Road (CR C60) in Mill Neck	Glen Cove Oyster Bay Road & Mill River Road	Lexington Avenue (CR D34) in Oyster Bay	Formerly part of CR 16.
CR C91	3.45	5.55	Bryant Avenue (CR C26) in Roslyn Harbor	Glen Cove Avenue	Mill Hill Road in the City of Glen Cove	Formerly part of CR 142 and CR 183.
CR C93	0.80	1.29	Hempstead Turnpike (NY 24) in Uniondale	Glenn Curtiss Boulevard	Merrick Avenue (CR 4) in East Meadow	
CR C94	1.87	3.01	Shore Road (CR E25) in Glenwood Landing	Glenwood Road, Glen Head Road	NY 107 in Old Brookville	Formerly CR 37.
CR C95	0.37	0.60	Cedar Swamp Road (CR C33)	Glen Street in the City of Glen Cove	Town Path (CR E40)	Formerly part of CR 107.
CR C96	0.97	1.56	Middle Neck Road (CR 11) in Great Neck Plaza	Grace Avenue	East Shore Road (CR C67) in Thomaston	Formerly CR 46.
CR C98	0.51	0.82	Peninsula Boulevard (CR 2)	Graham Avenue in the Village of Hempstead	Franklin Street (CR D10)	Formerly part of CR 62 and CR 62A
CR C99	0.79	1.27	North Columbus Avenue (CR C44)	Grand Avenue in Freeport	Babylon Turnpike (CR D11)	
CR D01 (1)	1.01	1.63	Northern Boulevard (NY 25A) in University Gardens	Great Neck Road	Middle Neck Road (CR 11) in Great Neck Plaza	Formerly CR 74.
CR D04 (2)	0.43	0.69	School House Hill Road (CR E17) in Glenwood Landing	Grove Street	Cody Avenue in Roslyn Harbor	Formerly part of CR 114.
CR D04	0.05	0.08	NY 27 (Sunrise Highway)	Grove Street North in Freeport	Brooklyn Avenue (CR C23)	
CR D06	1.11	1.79	Roslyn Road (CR 7A)	Harbor Hill Road in East Hills	Glen Cove Road (CR 1)	Formerly part of CR 32, which was the designation for all of Harbor Hill and Red Ground Roads.
CR D07	0.85	1.37	Shore Road (CR E25) in Port Washington North	Harbor Road	Middle Neck Road (CR D55) in Port Washington	Formerly part of CR 47, with Mill Pond Road.
CR D08	1.12	1.80	NY 107	Hegemans Lane in Old Brookville	Chicken Valley Road	Formerly CR 53.
CR D09	4.06	6.53	Merrick Road (CR 27) in Lynbrook	Hempstead Avenue	NY 102 (Front Street) in West Hempstead	Formerly CR 3.
CR D10	3.56	5.73	North Village Avenue in Rockville Centre	Hempstead Avenue & South Frankin Street	NY 102 (Front Street) in Hempstead Village	Formerly part of CR 3 and CR 6.
CR D11	2.61	4.20	North Main Street/Nassau Road (CR 7B) in Roosevelt	Babylon Turnpike	Merrick Road (CR 27) in Merrick	Formerly CR 7A.
CR D12	0.86	1.38	Horton Avenue	Hendrickson Avenue in Lynbrook	Franklin Avenue	Formerly part of CR 41.
CR D13 (1)	0.56	0.90	Tompkins Place	Henry Street in Hempstead village	Peninsula Boulevard (CR 2)	
CR D13 (2)	0.47	0.76	Hoff Court	Henry Street in Freeport	Merrick Road (CR 27)	
CR D14	0.14	0.23	West Marie Street	Herzog Place in Hicksville	Jerusalem Avenue	
CR D15	0.78	1.26	Middle Neck Road in Great Neck	Hicks Lane	Station Road in Kings Point	
CR D16	1.09	1.75	Long Island Rail Road overpass	East Marie Street & Plainview Road	South Oyster Bay Road (CR 9) and Old Country Road (CR 25) in Plainview	Formerly CR 98.
CR D17	0.88	1.42	Brewster Street	Highland Road in the City of Glen Cove	Glen Cove Station	Formerly part of CR 70.
CR D18	0.23	0.37	The Place	Hill Street in the City of Glen Cove	Landing Road	Formerly CR 141.
CR D19	0.24	0.39	Lake Success village line	Hollow Lane in North Hills	New Hyde Park Road (CR 5B)	
CR D20	0.90	1.45	Lattingtown Road	Horse Hollow Road in Lattingtown	Bayville Road	
CR D21	0.91	1.46	Rockaway Parkway in Valley Stream	Horton Avenue	Hendrickson Avenue (CR D12) in Lynbrook	Formerly part of CR 173.
CR D22	0.11	0.18	Branch Boulevard (CR C18)	Hungry Harbor Road in North Woodmere	Entrance to North Woodmere Park	
CR D23	0.38	0.61	Hempstead Town line	Island Parkway in Island Park	Long Beach Road	Formerly CR 1B.
CR D24 (1)	-	-	•Shelter Rock Road (CR 8) in North Hills; •Guinea Woods Road (CR 1) in Old Westbury	I.U. Willets Road	•Searingtown-North Hills border •Old Westbury Road in Old Westbury	Formerly CR 31; middle segment now owned by the Town of North Hempstead.
CR D24 (2)	0.39	0.63	Hempstead Turnpike (NY 24)	James Doolittle Boulevard in East Garden City (Uniondale)	Charles Lindbergh Boulevard (CR C28)	
CR D25	3.04	4.89	Hempstead Turnpike (NY 24) in Levittown	Jerusalem Avenue	East Barclay Street in Hicksville	Formerly part of CR 34, with Gardiners Avenue
CR D26						Designation unused
CR D27	0.84	1.35	Glenwood Road (CR C94) in Glenwood Landing	Kissam Lane	Glen Cove Avenue (CR C91) in Glenwood Landing	Formerly CR 158.
CR D28 (1)	2.83	4.55	Hempstead Avenue (CR D09) at the Lynbrook–North Lynbrook border	Lakeview Avenue	Seaman Avenue West (CR E21) in Rockville Centre	Formerly part of CR 41.
CR D28 (2)	0.06	0.1	Hempstead Avenue (CR D09)	Lakeview Avenue Spur in North Lynbrook	Lakeview Avenue (CR D28)	Also known as South Franklin Avenue.
CR D29	0.94	1.51	Hill Street	Landing Road in Glen Cove	Dead End	Formerly part of CR 48, with Cottage Row.
CR D30	2.21	3.56	Dosoris Lane (CR C59) in Glen Cove	Lattingtown Road	Ludlam Lane in Lattingtown	Formerly CR 167.
CR D32	1.42	2.29	Daly Boulevard (CR C55)	Lawson Boulevard in Oceanside	Atlantic Avenue (CR C04)	Formerly part of CR 57; Daly Boulevard was originally part of Lawson Boulevard.
CR D33	0.07	0.11	Old Northern Boulevard (CR D71)	Layton Street in Roslyn	Mott Avenue	Formerly part of CR 112, with Mott Avenue.
CR D34	0.54	0.87	Pine Hollow Road	Lexington Avenue in Oyster Bay	West Main Street	
CR D35	1.11	1.79	Long Beach Road (CR 1) in Oceanside	Lincoln Avenue, Lower Lincoln Avenue	Merrick Road (CR 27) in Rockville Centre	Formerly CR 150.
CR D37 (1)	0.71	1.14	Round Hill Road (CR E13) in East Hills	Locust Lane	East Hills-Roslyn Heights border	Formerly part of former CR 7B.
CR D37 (2)	0.03	0.05	Glen Avenue in Sea Cliff	Locust Place	Prospect Avenue in Sea Cliff	
CR D38	0.49	0.79	Park Avenue in Long Beach	Long Beach Boulevard	Long Beach Road (CR D39) at Long Beach-Island Park border	Becomes Long Beach Road (CR D39) at its north end; formerly part of CR 1.
CR D39	7.62	12.26	Long Beach Boulevard at Long Beach-Island Park border	Long Beach Road	Baldwin Road (CR 55) in Hempstead	Becomes Long Beach Boulevard (CR D39) at its south end; formerly part of CR 1.
CR D40	1.28	2.06	North Jerusalem Road (CR 181) in Levittown	Loring Road	NY 24 (Hempstead Turnpike) in Levittown	Formerly CR 156.
CR D41	0.26	0.41	Bayville Bridge (CR E54)	Ludlam Avenue in Bayville	Bayville Avenue	Formerly part of CR 14.
CR D42 (1)	0.25	0.4	Old Country Road (CR 25)	Main Street in Mineola	First Street	Formerly CR 121.
CR D42 (2)	2.01	3.23	Nassau-Suffolk County border in South Farmingdale	Main Street	Bethpage Road in Farmingdale	Formerly part of CR 110.
CR D42 (3)	1.15	1.85	East Rockaway-Woodmere border	Main Street in East Rockaway	Atlantic Avenue	Formerly part of NY 103 from c. 1931 to c. 1934; also formerly part of CR 10 and CR 10A.
CR D43	1.96	3.15	Plainview Road (CR D91) in Plainview	Manetto Hill Road	Woodbury Road (CR 12) in Woodbury	Formerly part of CR 28, with Old Bethpage Road
CR D44 (1)	0.55	0.89	Orchard Beach Road (CR D79)	Manorhaven Boulevard in Manorhaven	Shore Road (CR E25)	Formerly part of CR 15.
CR D44 (2)	1.18	1.9	Carle Road in Westbury	Westbury Avenue, Maple Avenue	Union Avenue in Westbury	Formerly part of CR 12.
CR D46	2.2	3.54	Queens-Nassau border	Marcus Avenue	Jericho Turnpike (NY 25) in Garden City Park	Formerly part of NY 25C and then as former CR 25C.
CR D49	1.53	2.46	Dutch Broadway (CR C62)	Meacham Avenue in Franklin Square and Elmont	Hempstead Turnpike (NY 24)	Much of its length forms the Franklin Square–Elmont border; formerly part of CR 174, with Covert Avenue.
CR D50	0.69	1.11	Nassau Expressway (NY 878)	Rock Hall Road in Lawrence	Causeway	
CR D51	0.48	0.77	Causeway	Meadow Lane in Lawrence	Broadway (CR C22)	Formerly part of CR 104. Also formerly part of NY 104 from c. 1931 to c. 1933
CR D52	0.63	1.01	Main Street	Melville Road in Farmingdale	Suffolk County line	Formerly CR 108.
CR D54	0.88	1.42	Thorne Drive in Plainedge	Merritts Road	Fulton Street (NY 24) in Farmingdale	Formerly part of CR 186, with Central Avenue.
CR D55	2.51	4.04	NY 101 (Port Washington Boulevard) and Harbor Road (CR D07) in Port Washington	Middle Neck Road	Lighthouse Road in Sands Point	Formerly the northern segment of CR 101. Lighthouse Road was originally named Mill Neck Road.
CR D56	1.49	2.4	Atlantic Avenue	Milburn Avenue in Baldwin	Grand Avenue	Formerly CR 91.
CR D57 (1)	0.3	0.48	Shore Road (CR E25)	Mill Pond Road in Port Washington North	Harbor Road	Formerly part of CR 47, with Harbor Road.
CR D57 (2)	1.43	2.3	Glen Cove Oyster Bay Road (CR C90)	Frost Mill Road in Mill Neck	Cleft Road	
CR D58 (1)	1.67	2.69	West Broadway (CR E51) in Hewlett	Mill Road	Sunrise Highway (NY 27) in Valley Stream	Formerly part of CR 20.
CR D58 (2)	0.39	0.63	South Main Street (CR E27)	Mill Road in Freeport	Merrick Road (CR 27)	Formerly part of CR 90.
CR D60	1.22	1.96	Old Country Road (CR 25) in Garden City	Mineola Boulevard	Hillside Avenue (NY 25B) in Williston Park	Formerly part of CR 6.
CR D62	0.81	1.3	Merritts Road	Motor Avenue in Farmingdale	Main Street (CR 110)	Formerly CR 97.
CR D63	0.26	0.42	Layton Street (CR D33)	Mott Avenue in Roslyn	West Shore Road (CR 15)	Formerly part of CR 112, with Layton Street; roadway shifted in the 1940s for the construction of the William Cullen Bryant Viaduct.
CR D64	0.3	0.48	Long Beach Road (CR D39)	Mott Street in Oceanside	Oceanside Road (CR D75)	Formerly part of CR 56, with Oceanside Road.
CR D65	2.12	3.41	Lincoln Avenue	North Village Avenue in Rockville Centre	Allen Road	Formerly part of CR 40.
CR D66 (1)	4.15	6.68	Hempstead Avenue (CR D09) in West Hempstead	Nassau Boulevard	Marcus Avenue (CR D46) in Garden City Park	Formerly CR 39.
CR D66 (2)	0.55	0.89	Jericho Turnpike (NY 25) in Mineola	Nassau Boulevard	Hillside Avenue (NY 25B) in Williston Park	
CR D69	2.07	3.33	NY 105/NY 106 in North Bellmore	Newbridge Road	Merrick Road (CR 27) in Bellmore	Formerly designated as CR 102. County-maintained portion of Newbridge Road.
CR D71	0.7	1.13	Northern Boulevard (NY 25A) and Middle Neck Road in Flower Hill	Old Northern Boulevard	East Broadway (CR C65) in Roslyn	Former routing of NY 25A; formerly designated later as CR 25A following Nassau County's takeover when the William Cullen Bryant Viaduct opened.
CR D74	2.8	4.51	Atlantic Avenue (CR 10) and Ocean Avenue (CR 10A) in East Rockaway	Ocean Avenue	Hempstead Avenue (CR 3) in Malverne	Formerly CR 21.
CR D75	2.4	3.86	Mott Street (CR D64) in Oceanside	Oceanside Road	North Long Beach Road (CR D39) in Baldwin	Formerly part of CR 56, with Mott Street.
CR D76	1.12	1.8	Round Swamp Road (CR 110) in Old Bethpage	Old Bethpage Road	Plainview Road (CR D91) in Plainview	Formerly part of CR 28, with Manetto Hill Road
CR D78 (1)	0.6	0.97	Bayview Avenue (CR 43) in Great Neck	Old Mill Road	Middle Neck Road (CR 11) in Great Neck	Formerly CR 77.
CR D78 (2)	0.1	0.16	Shore Road (CR E25)	Old Shore Road in Port Washington North	Pleasant Avenue	
CR D79	0.18	0.29	Manorhaven Boulevard (CR D44)	Orchard Beach Road in Manorhaven	Dead end	Formerly part of CR 15.
CR D80	1.67	2.69	Northern Boulevard (NY 25A)	Oyster Bay Cove Road in Oyster Bay Cove	Cove Neck Road (CR C51)	Formerly part of CR 17. Also known as Cove Road.
CR D81	-	-	Ocean Avenue in East Rockaway	Park Avenue	Sunrise Highway (NY 27) in Rockville Centre	The portion from Ocean Avenue to Hillside Avenue was formerly designated as CR 92.
CR D82	0.75	1.21	Merrick Road (CR 27)	Park Boulevard in Massapequa Park	Sunrise Highway (NY 27)	Formerly CR 171.
CR D86	-	-	Ocean Avenue in East Rockaway	Pearl Street	Rockaway Avenue in Oceanside	Formerly CR 133.
CR D87	-	-	Glen Street	Pearsall Avenue in the City of Glen Cove	Duck Pond Road	Formerly part of CR 70.
CR D89	2.95	4.75	Wolver Hollow Road in Upper Brookville	Piping Rock Road	Birch Hill Road (CR C17) in Matinecock	Formerly part of CR 29.
CR D90	1.6	2.57	Elmont Road (CR C71) in Elmont	Plainfield Avenue	NY 25 (Jericho Turnpike) in New Hyde Park	Formerly part of CR 99.
CR D91	1.47	2.37	Seaford–Oyster Bay Expressway (NY 135) in Bethpage	Plainview Road	Manetto Hill and Old Bethpage Roads in Plainview	Formerly part of CR 65.
CR D92	0.38	0.61	Webster Avenue	Plandome Road in Plandome Heights	Terrace in Plandome	Formerly CR 170; formerly ran between Northern Boulevard (NY 25A) in Manhasset and the Plandome Heights-Plandome village line.
CR D93	0.04	0.06	Shore Road (CR E25) in Manorhaven	Pleasant Avenue	Old Shore Road (CR D78) in Port Washington North	
CR D96	0.36	0.58	Dead-end in North Hills	Powerhouse Road	Junction with the Long Island Expressway (I-495) North Service Road in Roslyn Heights	Formerly part of NY 25D, and then part of former CR 25D.
CR D97	0.51	0.82	Front Street	President Street in Hempstead village	Peninsula Boulevard (CR 2)	Formerly part of CR 62.
CR D98	0.16	0.26	Coles Street	Ellwood Street in the City of Glen Cove	Landing Road	
CR D99	-	-	Central Avenue and Merritts Road in Bethpage	Quaker Meeting House Road	Bethpage Road and Round Swamp Road in Farmingdale	Formerly CR 160
CR E01	0.79	1.27	Charles Lindbergh Boulevard (CR C28)	Quentin Roosevelt Boulevard in East Garden City (Uniondale)	Stewart Avenue (CR 177)	
CR E03	0.12	0.19	Merrick Road (CR 27) in Valley Stream	Railroad Avenue	Valley Stream–Lynbrook village line	Formerly part of CR 41; Railroad Avenue was originally named Railroad Boulevard.
CR E05	1.06	1.71	Glen Cove Road (CR 1) in East Hills	Red Ground Road	Long Island Expressway (I-495) in Old Westbury	Formerly part of CR 32, which was the designation for all of Harbor Hill and Red Ground Roads.
CR E06 (1)	0.59	0.95	Garden City-West Hempstead border	Rockaway Avenue	Cherry Valley Avenue in Garden City	Formerly part of CR 84.
CR E06 (2)	0.99	1.6	Stewart Avenue (CR 177) in Garden City	Rockaway Avenue	Old Country Road (CR 25) in Garden City	
CR E06 (3)	0.91	1.46	Atlantic Avenue in Oceanside	Rockaway Avenue	Woods Avenue in Rockville Centre	
CR E06 (4)	2.57	4.14	Broadway (CR C22) in Hewlett	Rockaway Avenue	North Corona Avenue (CR C47) in North Valley Stream	
CR E10	0.9	1.45	Hungry Harbor Road at the Queens-Nassau border	Rosedale Road, Brookfield Road	Mill Road (CR 20) in Valley Stream	Formerly CR 51.
CR E13	0.30	0.48	Roslyn Road (CR 7A) in Roslyn Heights	Round Hill Road	Locust Lane (CR D37) in East Hills	Part of former CR 7B, which ran along Locust Lane and Round Hill Road from Roslyn Road in Albertson to Roslyn Road in Roslyn Heights, via East Hills.
CR E14	0.48	0.77	Cove Neck Road (CR C51)	Sagamore Hill Road in Cove Neck	Sagamore Hill National Historic Site	Access to Sagamore Hill National Historic Site; formerly part of CR 50.
CR E15	2.82	4.54	Old Country Road (CR 25) in Westbury	Salisbury Park Drive	Newbridge Road (NY 106) in Levittown	Formerly designated as CR 64.
CR E16	0.15	0.24	Elmont Road (CR C71)	School Road in Elmont	NY 24 (Hempstead Turnpike)	Formerly CR 99A.
CR E17	0.14	0.23	Glenwood Road (CR C94)	School House Hill Road in Glenwood Landing	Grove Street (CR D04)	Formerly part of CR 114.
CR E18	-	-	Atlantic Avenue in East Rockaway	Scranton Avenue	NY 27 (Sunrise Highway) in Lynbrook	Formerly CR 58.
CR E19	-	-	Glenwood Road and Scudders Lane in Glenwood Landing	Scudders Lane	Glen Cove Avenue (CR C91) in Glen Head	Formerly CR 66.
CR E20	1.7	2.74	Prospect Avenue (CR 7) in Sea Cliff	Sea Cliff Avenue	Cedar Swamp Road (NY 107) in Glen Cove	Formerly CR 38.
CR E21 (1)	0.71	1.14	Lakeview Avenue (CR D28) in Rockville Centre	Seaman Avenue West	Grand Avenue (CR 55) in Baldwin	Formerly part of CR 41.
CR E21 (2)	1.79	2.88	Grand Avenue (CR 55) in Baldwin	Seaman Avenue East	Babylon Turnpike (CR D11) in Freeport	
CR E22	1.97	3.17	Tollgate Lane in North Wantagh	Seamans Neck Road, Union Avenue	NY 24 (Hempstead Turnpike) and Stewart Avenue (CR E32) in Plainedge	Formerly designated as CR 191.
CR E23	0.40	0.64	Third Avenue	Second Street in Mineola	Roslyn Road (CR 7A)	
CR E24 (1)	0.96	1.54	Queens-Nassau border	Sheridan Boulevard in Inwood	Doughty Boulevard (CR 75)	
CR E24 (2)	0.40	0.64	Westbury Avenue (CR E57)	Sheridan Boulevard in Mineola	Jericho Turnpike (NY 25)	Formerly designated as CR 120.
CR E25 (1)	0.89	1.43	Main Street in Baxter Estates	Shore Road	Cow Neck Road (CR C53) in Port Washington North	Formerly designated as part of CR 15.
CR E25 (2)	0.36	0.58	Northern Boulevard (NY 25A) and Community Drive (CR 11A) in Manhasset	East Shore Road, Bayview Avenue	Maple Avenue in Manhasset	East Shore Road portion formerly part of CR 11A; Bayview Avenue portion formerly CR 73.
CR E25 (3)	3.25	5.23	Scudders Lane (CR E19) in Glenwood Landing	Shore Road, Prospect Avenue, Cliff Way	Glen Cove Avenue (CR C91) in Glen Cove	Formerly part of CR 7.
CR E25 (4)	0.59	0.95	Bryant Avenue (CR C26)	Glenwood Road in Roslyn Harbor	Scudders Lane (CR E19)	
CR E26 (1)	0.27	0.43	Green Acres Road	Sidney Place in Valley Stream	Mill Road	Formerly CR 96.
CR E26 (2)	1.05	1.69	Forest Avenue (CR C79) in Glen Cove	Skunks Misery Road	Ludlam Lane in Lattingtown	Formerly part of CR 1.
CR E27	1.09	1.75	Cow Meadow Park	South Main Street in Freeport	Henry Street & Smith Street	Formerly part of CR 7 and CR 90.
CR E28	-	-	County Seat Drive	South Avenue in Garden City	Washington Avenue (CR 1)	Formerly CR 162.
CR E29	0.3	0.48	Seaman Avenue	St. Lukes Place in Baldwin	Grand Avenue (CR 55)	Formerly CR 41B.
CR E30	0.30	0.48	Kings Point village line	Station Road	East Shore Road and Hicks Lane (CR D15) in Kings Point	Formerly CR 138.
CR E31	1.27	2.04	Stepping Stone Lane	Steamboat Road in Kings Point	Middle Neck Road (CR 11)	Formerly CR 44.
CR E32	0.77	1.24	Salisbury Park Drive in Salisbury	Stewart Avenue	Newbridge Road (NY 106) in Hicksville	Formerly designated as CR 111.
CR E33	3.83	6.16	Hicksville Road (NY 107) in Plainedge	Stewart Avenue	South Oyster Bay Road (CR 9) in Bethpage	Formerly designated as CR E35.
CR E34	0.16	0.26	Post Road (CR 4)	Store Hill Road in Old Westbury	Dead End	
CR E36	0.18	0.29	County Seat Drive	Supreme Court Drive in Garden City	Washington Avenue (CR 1)	
CR E37	0.22	0.35	Graham Avenue (CR C98)	Sycamore Avenue in Hempstead Village	Peninsula Boulevard (CR 2)	Formerly part of CR 62.
CR E38	1.41	2.27	Syosset–Cold Spring Road in Syosset	Syosset–Woodbury Road	Woodbury Road (CR 12) in Woodbury	Formerly CR 180.
CR E39 (1)	1.41	2.27	Jackson Avenue in Syosset	Syosset–Cold Spring Road	North Hempstead Turnpike (NY 25A) in Laurel Hollow	Formerly part of CR 19; commonly known as Cold Spring Road.
CR E39 (2)	0.17	0.27	Piping Rock Road (CR D89) in Matinecock	Town Cocks Lane	Buckram Road (CR C26) in Locust Valley	
CR E40	0.42	0.68	NY 107	Town Path in Glen Cove	Pearsall Avenue	Formerly part of CR 30.
CR E41	2.02	3.22	Jericho Turnpike (NY 25) at the Queens-Nassau border	Tulip Avenue	New Hyde Park Road (CR 5) in Franklin Square	Formerly CR 42.
CR E42	1.25	2.01	Jericho Turnpike (NY 25) in Syosset	Underhill Boulevard	Jackson Avenue in Syosset	Formerly part of CR 19.
CR E43	1.17	1.88	East Rockaway Road (CR 10) in Hewlett	Union Avenue	Atlantic Avenue in Lynbrook	Formerly CR 59.
CR E45	0.73	1.17	Pearsall Avenue (CR D87)	Walnut Avenue in Glen Cove	Forest Avenue (CR C79)	
CR E47	0.29	0.47	Island Park village line	Warwick Boulevard	Long Beach Road (CR D39) in Island Park	Formerly CR 187.
CR E48	3.15	5.07	Manetto Hill Road (CR D43) in Plainview	Washington Avenue and Plainview Road	NY 25 (Jericho Turnpike) in Woodbury	Formerly part of CR 65.
CR E50	0.47	0.76	Forest Avenue in Locust Valley	Weir Lane, Weir Road	Skunks Misery Road (CR E26) in Lattingtown	Weir Lane was originally named Weir Avenue
CR E51	2.15	3.46	Rockaway Turnpike (CR 257) in Cedarhurst	West Broadway	Broadway (CR C22) in Hewlett	
CR E52	0.28	0.45	Lexington Avenue (CR D34)	West Main Street in Oyster Bay	South Street (NY 106)	
CR E53	0.06	0.1	Powells Lane	West Powells Lane in Old Westbury	South Service Road of I-495	
CR E54	2.44	3.93	Lexington Avenue (CR D34) in Oyster Bay	West Shore Road, West Main Street	Ludlam Avenue (CR D41) at Bayville village line	Crosses the Bayville Bridge.
CR E55	0.12	0.19	Fifteenth Street (CR C76)	West Street in Garden City	Old Country Road (CR 25)	
CR E57	1.86	2.99	Roslyn Road (CR 7A) in Mineola	Westbury Avenue	Maple Avenue in Westbury	Formerly part of CR 12.
CR E58	0.18	0.29	Oak Street (CR D74)	Westbury Boulevard in East Garden City (Uniondale)	Charles Lindbergh Boulevard (CR C28)	
CR E59	0.71	1.14	Hempstead Avenue (CR D09) in West Hempstead	Westminster Road	Garden City-West Hempstead border	
CR E60	3.42	5.50	Post Road	Wheatley Road in Old Westbury	Northern Boulevard (NY 25A) in Muttontown	Formerly part of CR 4.
CR E61	0.91	1.46	Hendrickson Avenue (CR D12) in Lynbrook	Whitehall Street	Franklin Avenue (CR C83) in North Lynbrook	
CR E62	0.42	0.68	Jerusalem Avenue (CR 105)	William Street in Hempstead Village	NY 102/CR 102 (Front Street)	Formerly CR 85.
CR E63	0.05	0.08	Fourth Avenue	Williamson Street in East Rockaway	Fifth Avenue	
CR E64	4.51	7.26	Old Country Road (CR 25) in Mineola	Willis Avenue, Mineola Avenue	Northern Boulevard (NY 25A) in Flower Hill	Formerly designated as CR 71.
CR E65	1.45	2.33	Northern Boulevard (NY 25A) in Muttontown	Wolver Hollow Road	Chicken Valley Road (CR C39) in Upper Brookville	Formerly part of CR 4.
CR E67	2.47	3.98	Lakeview Avenue in Lakeview	Woodfield Road	Hempstead Avenue (CR D09) in West Hempstead	
CR E68	1.59	2.56	Hickory Road in Hewlett Neck	Woodmere Boulevard	Peninsula Boulevard (CR 2) in Woodmere	Formerly designated as CR 93.

== See also ==
- County routes in New York
- List of county routes in Suffolk County, New York
- List of former state routes in New York (101–200)
