= East Meadow Avenue =

County highway in Nassau County, New York

- Nassau County Route C62
- East Meadow Avenue, highlighted in red

Route information
- Maintained by NCDPW
- Length: 1.95 mi (3.14 km)

Major junctions
- South end: NY 106 in North Bellmore
- NY 102 in East Meadow
- North end: NY 24 and Park Boulevard (CR D82) in East Meadow

Location
- Country: United States
- State: New York
- County: Nassau

Highway system
- County routes in New York; County Routes in Nassau County

East Meadow Avenue is a major, 1.95-mile (3.14 km) road in Nassau County, on Long Island, New York, connecting North Bellmore and East Meadow. The road, in its entirety, is designated as unsigned Nassau County Route C62, and is one of two separate Nassau County highways with this designation – the other being Dutch Broadway. It is owned by Nassau County and is maintained by the Nassau County Department of Public Works.

Historically, East Meadow Avenue was known as Newbridge Avenue.

== Route description ==
CR C62 begins at Newbridge Road (NY 106) in North Bellmore. From there, it travels northwest, soon intersecting Jerusalem Road (CR 181), entering East Meadow. It continues northwest from there, eventually intersecting Prospect Avenue, thence continuing northwest to Front Street (NY 102). From NY 102, CR C62 continues northwest, eventually reaching an intersection with Hempstead Turnpike (NY 24) and Park Boulevard (CR D82), where the route terminates.

North of the intersection with NY 24, East Meadow Avenue becomes Park Boulevard, at which point the CR C62 designation is replaced with the CR D82 designation.

The entirety of CR C69 is classified as a minor arterial road by the New York State Department of Transportation.

== History ==
East Meadow Avenue was originally known as Newbridge Avenue. The name of the road was changed to East Meadow Avenue in 1982, to distinguish it from, and avoid potential confusion with, Newbridge Road – East Meadow Avenue's southern terminus. The name change was unanimously approved by the Hempstead Town Council on March 23, 1982, and the name change was ultimately made official on May 28 of that year. Five years prior, an unsuccessful proposal to rename the road was made by the East Meadow Chamber of Commerce, which had asked the Hempstead Town Council to rename the road as East Meadow Boulevard.

East Meadow Avenue was formerly designated as CR 144, prior to the route numbers in Nassau County being altered. It, along with all of the other county routes in Nassau County, became unsigned in the 1970s, when Nassau County officials opted to remove the county route shields as opposed to allocating the funds for replacing them with new ones that met the latest federal design standards and requirements, as per the federal government's Manual on Uniform Traffic Control Devices.

== Major intersections ==
Location	mi	km	Destinations	Notes
North Bellmore	0.00	0.00	NY 106 – North Bellmore, Oyster Bay (hamlet)	At-grade intersection
North Bellmore–East Meadow line	0.2	0.32	Cold Spring Road (CR E39)	
East Meadow	1.07	1.72	McKinley Avenue	
East Meadow	1.17	1.88	Prospect Avenue	
East Meadow	1.64	2.64	NY 102 – Hempstead (village), East Meadow	At-grade intersection
East Meadow	1.95	3.14	NY 24 (Hempstead Turnpike) – New York, East Farmingdale; Park Boulevard (CR D82)	Roadway continues north as Park Boulevard (CR 82); access to Eisenhower Park via CR D82; at-grade intersection
1.000 mi = 1.609 km; 1.000 km = 0.621 mi

== See also ==
- List of county routes in Nassau County, New York
- Dutch Broadway
