= Grace Avenue =

County highway in Nassau County, New York

County Route C96
- Grace Avenue
- Grace Avenue, highlighted in red

Route information
- Maintained by NCDPW
- Length: 0.97 mi (1,560 m)

Major junctions
- West end: Middle Neck Road (CR 11) in Great Neck Plaza
- East end: East Shore Road (CR E67) in Thomaston

Location
- Country: United States
- State: New York
- County: Nassau

Highway system
- County routes in New York; County Routes in Nassau County

Grace Avenue is a 0.97-mile (1.56 km) road connecting the villages of Great Neck Plaza and Thomaston on the Great Neck Peninsula within the Town of North Hempstead, in Nassau County, New York, United States.

Owned by Nassau County and maintained by the Nassau County Department of Public Works, the road is designated by the county as the unsigned Nassau County Route C96.

== Route description ==
Grace Avenue begins at Middle Neck Road (CR 11) in the Village of Great Neck Plaza. From there, it runs east, intersecting Bond Street one block later. It continues straight from there, towards the east, soon reaching an intersection with Barstow Road. Continuing straight, Grace Avenue continues east, eventually reaching Gilchrest Road. From there – still running straight –,Grace Avenue continues heading east, soon reaching Colonial Road.

At its intersection with Colonial Road, Grace Avenue veers towards the east-northeast, paralleling the Long Island Rail Road's Port Washington Branch before the road curves its way down a hill. At the bottom of the hill, Grace Avenue reaches an intersection with East Shore Road (CR C67), where both the roadway and the CR C96 route designation terminate.

Grace Avenue – in its entirety – is classified as a minor arterial highway by the New York State Department of Transportation and is eligible for federal aid.

== History ==
Grace Avenue is named after the Grace family – a prominent New York family which formerly owned land in the vicinity of the road.

In the 1970s, Grace Avenue was extended one block west from its western terminus – from Middle Neck Road (CR 11) to Walnut Place. This segment, which is owned and maintained by the Incorporated Village of Great Neck Plaza, was constructed to alleviate congestion in the downtown area. The proposal for the one-block extension drew significant opposition from the government of the adjacent village, Thomaston. This one-block extension of the roadway would eventually become known as part of Gussack Plaza, and is owned and maintained by the Incorporated Village of Great Neck Plaza.

=== Route number ===
Beginning in 1959, when the Nassau County Department of Public Works created a numbered highway system as part of their "Master Plan" for the county highway system, Grace Avenue was originally designated as County Route 46. This route, along with all of the other county routes in Nassau County, became unsigned in the 1970s, when Nassau County officials opted to remove the signs as opposed to allocating the funds for replacing them with new ones that met the latest federal design standards and requirements stated in the federal government's Manual on Uniform Traffic Control Devices.

Subsequently, Nassau County renumbered many of its county roads, with Grace Avenue being renumbered as Nassau County Route C96.

== Major intersections ==
Location	mi	km	Destinations	Notes
Great Neck Plaza	0.00	0.00	Middle Neck Road (CR 11) and Gussack Plaza	Western terminus of CR C96 designation and county ownership; Grace avenue continues one block west as Gussack Plaza – a village-maintained road
Great Neck Plaza	0.08	0.13	Bond Street	Access to the Great Neck LIRR station
Great Neck Plaza–Thomaston line	0.43	0.69	Gilchrest Road	
Thomaston	0.58	0.93	Colonial Road	
Thomaston	0.97	1.56	East Shore Road (CR E67)	Eastern terminus
1.000 mi = 1.609 km; 1.000 km = 0.621 mi

== Transportation ==
As of September 2025, two Nassau Inter-County Express (NICE) bus routes travel along portions of Grace Avenue: the n57 and the n58.

== See also ==
- List of county routes in Nassau County, New York
- County Route 11 (Nassau County, New York)
