= West Shore Road (Oyster Bay, New York) =

County highway in Nassau County, New York

County Route E54

Route information
- Maintained by NCDPW
- Length: 2.44 mi (3.93 km)

Major junctions
- South end: Lexington Avenue (CR D34) in Oyster Bay
- Lake Avenue/Mill Hill Road at the Oyster Bay–Mill Neck border Cleft Road in Mill Neck
- North end: Ludlam Avenue (CR D41) in Bayville

Location
- Country: United States
- State: New York
- County: Nassau

Highway system
- County routes in New York; County Routes in Nassau County

CR E54, highlighted in red

Nassau County Route E54 is a major, 2.44-mile (3.93 km) thoroughfare in northeastern Nassau County, New York, linking the hamlet of Oyster Bay with the Village of Bayville, which it reaches by crossing Mill Neck Creek via the Bayville Bridge.

CR E54, in its entirety, is owned by Nassau County and maintained by the Nassau County Department of Public Works, and consists of West Shore Road and the western portions of West Main Street. An unbuilt extension of the Seaford–Oyster Bay Expressway to Rye via the Rye–Oyster Bay Bridge would have followed portions of West Shore Road.

== Route description ==
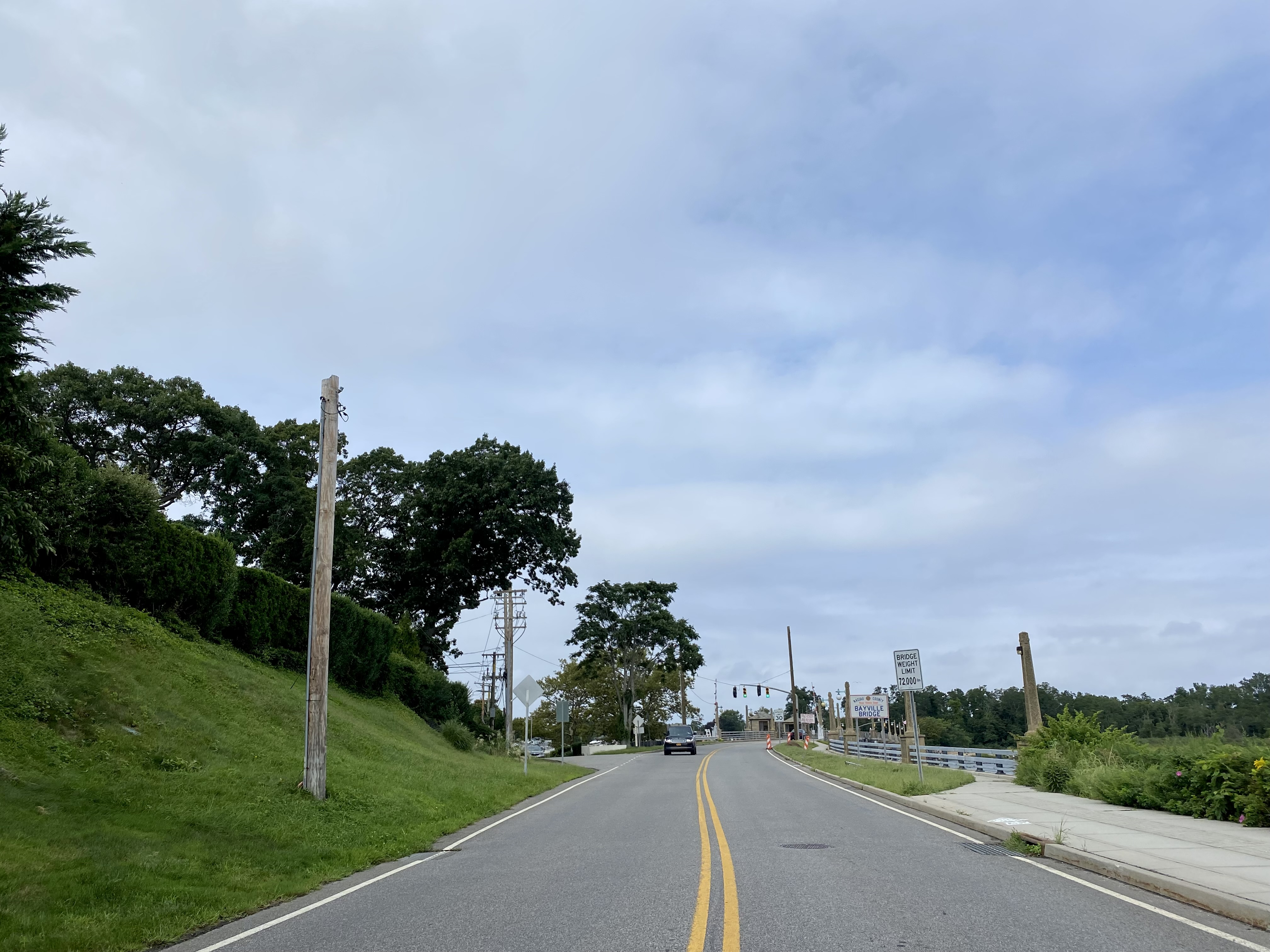
CR E54 approaching the Bayville Bridge in 2021

CR E54 begins as West Main Street at Lexington Avenue (CR D34) in Oyster Bay; the portions of West Main Street east of this location comprise CR E52. It then proceeds west-northwest to Mill Hill Road, entering the Incorporated Village of Mill Neck. The road then turns north-northwest, crossing underneath the Long Island Rail Road's Oyster Bay Branch and hugs the western shoreline of Oyster Bay Harbor – a coastline that it hugs until reaching the Bayville Bridge. It then continues north along the coastline, soon intersecting Cleft Road, thence continuing north to the Bayville Bridge, which it then crosses.

Immediately upon reaching the north end of the Bayville Bridge, the road then enters the Incorporated Village of Bayville. The CR E54 designation ends at this location, and the roadway continues north into Bayville's downtown as Ludlam Avenue (CR D41).

The entirety of CR E54 is classified as a minor arterial highway by the New York State Department of Transportation and is eligible for federal aid.

== History ==
In the 1960s, it was proposed by Robert Moses to extend the Seaford–Oyster Bay Expressway north to Interstate 287 in Rye, Westchester County, via the Rye–Oyster Bay Bridge – and, in turn, extending I-287 south onto Long Island; this extension would have followed portions of West Shore Road, along the Oyster Bay Harbor shoreline. The proposal was met with stiff opposition from locals in Oyster Bay and Bayville upon the plans being brought before the Federal Highway Administration, leading to the creation of what is now the Congressman Lester Wolff Oyster Bay National Wildlife Refuge in 1968 – and, further, to the cancellation of the highway project in 1973.

In the 1980s, there was a proposal to widen West Shore Road to improve safety – in addition to repairing the seawall paralleling the road. A wide, painted median and a shoulder were proposed as part of the plan. This proposal was complicated by environmental concerns and the fact that the wetlands on the east side of the road being deeded to the Federal Government, as per a 1968 agreement.

=== Route number ===
Beginning in 1959, when the Nassau County Department of Public Works created a numbered highway system as part of their "Master Plan" for the county highway system, all of CR E54 was originally designated as part of County Route 14, along with Ludlam Avenue (CR D41) and the western portions of West Main Street (CR E52). This route, along with all of the other county routes in Nassau County, became unsigned in the 1970s, when Nassau County officials opted to remove the signs as opposed to allocating the funds for replacing them with new ones that met the latest federal design standards and requirements stated in the federal government's Manual on Uniform Traffic Control Devices.

== Major intersections ==
Location	mi	km	Destinations	Notes
Oyster Bay (hamlet)	0.00	0.00	Lexington Avenue (CR D34)	Southern terminus; road continues east as West Main Street (CR E52)
Oyster Bay (hamlet)–Mill Neck line	0.32	0.51	Lake Avenue and Mill Hill Road	Road name changes from West Main Street to West Shore Road
Mill Neck	0.93	1.50	Cleft Road	
Bayville	2.44	3.93	Ludlam Avenue (CR D41)	Northern terminus; road continues north as Ludlam Avenue (CR D41)
1.000 mi = 1.609 km; 1.000 km = 0.621 mi: Route transition

== County Route E52 (Nassau County, New York) ==
County Route E52
- Location: Oyster Bay
- Length: 0.28 mi (450 m)

The portion of West Main Street designated as CR E52, highlighted in red

County Route E52 is a county route designation given to the 0.28-mile (0.45 km) stretch of West Main Street east of Lexington Avenue (CR D34), located entirely within the hamlet of Oyster Bay.

=== Route description ===
CR E52 begins at Lexington Avenue (CR D34). It continues east to South Street (NY 106).

West of Lexington Avenue, the road continues west and north to Bayville as CR E54.

The entirety of CR E54 is classified as a minor arterial highway by the New York State Department of Transportation and is eligible for federal aid.

=== History ===
CR E52 was formerly designated as part of CR 14, with both West Shore Road and the remainder of West Main Street (CR E54) – along with Ludlam Avenue (CR D41), prior to the route numbers in Nassau County being altered.

=== Landmarks ===
The NYSRHP- and NRHP-listed Raynham Hall is located along the portion of West Main Street designated as CR E52. This historic home with connections to the American Revolution is now a museum.

== See also ==
- List of county routes in Nassau County, New York
- County Route 15 (Nassau County, New York)
- Shore Road (Port Washington, New York)
- Highway revolts in the United States
