= Long Beach Road =

Road in Nassau County, New York

Route information
- Maintained by NCDPW
- Length: 7.62 mi (12.26 km)

Major junctions
- North end: Baldwin Road (CR 55) in the Village of Hempstead
- South end: Long Beach Bridge/Long Beach Boulevard (CR D38) at the Island Park–Long Beach border

Location
- Country: United States
- State: New York
- County: Nassau

Highway system
- County routes in New York; County Routes in Nassau County

Long Beach Road is a major, 7.62-mile (12.26 km) road in the Town of Hempstead, in Nassau County, New York, United States. It serves as a major north–south roadway, connecting the City of Long Beach (via the Long Beach Bridge and Long Beach Boulevard (CR D38)) at its southern end with Baldwin Road (CR 55) in the Village of Hempstead at its northern end.

The entire road is designated as County Route D39 (CR D39) and is owned and maintained by the County of Nassau.

== Route description ==
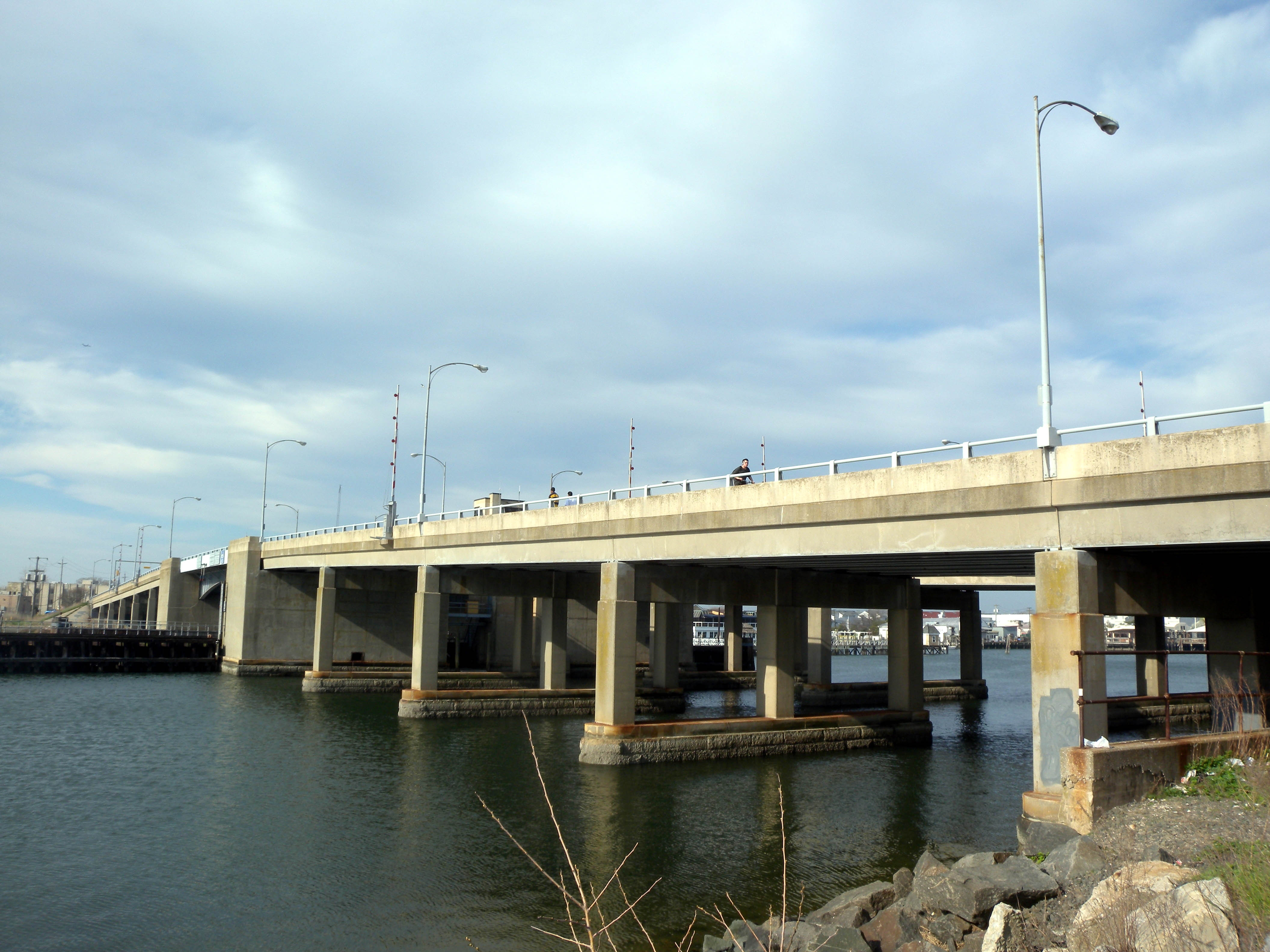
Long Beach Bridge, CR D39's southern terminus

Long Beach Road runs north–south through the incorporated villages of Hempstead, Rockville Centre, and Island Park, as well as through the hamlets and Census-designated places of Barnum Island, Oceanside, and South Hempstead. The road serves as a main north–south route through portions of all of these communities.

The road is also a designated coastal evacuation route, and as such, it serves as a vital route for evacuating those residing in or visiting Long Island's oceanfront communities during major coastal storms, such as hurricanes.

Long Beach Road's southern terminus is at the Long Beach Bridge in the Village of Island Park, at the Island Park–Long Beach border, south of which it becomes Long Beach Boulevard (CR D38). Continuing north, CR D39 passes through the heart of Island Park, crossing the Long Island Rail Road's Long Beach Branch at grade level, passing the Island Park station and the Island Park Village Hall. The road then continues north for some distance, before turning towards the northeast, soon crossing the Long Beach Branch again at grade level, thence entering Barnum Island and meeting back up with Austin Boulevard (CR C05), turning back towards the north. From there, it continues towards the north, soon passing over a bridge, crossing onto Long Island and entering Oceanside, shortly after which it intersects Daly Boulevard (CR C55). Continuing towards the north, Long Beach Road soon intersects Mott Street (CR D64). It then gently turns towards the north-northwest for a short distance before turning back towards the north, traveling through Oceanside and eventually reaching Atlantic Avenue (CR C04). The road continues towards the north for a short distance, soon intersecting Davison Avenue (CR C56) before reaching a junction one block to the north with Lower Lincoln Avenue (CR D35), at which point Long Beach Road veers towards the northeast.

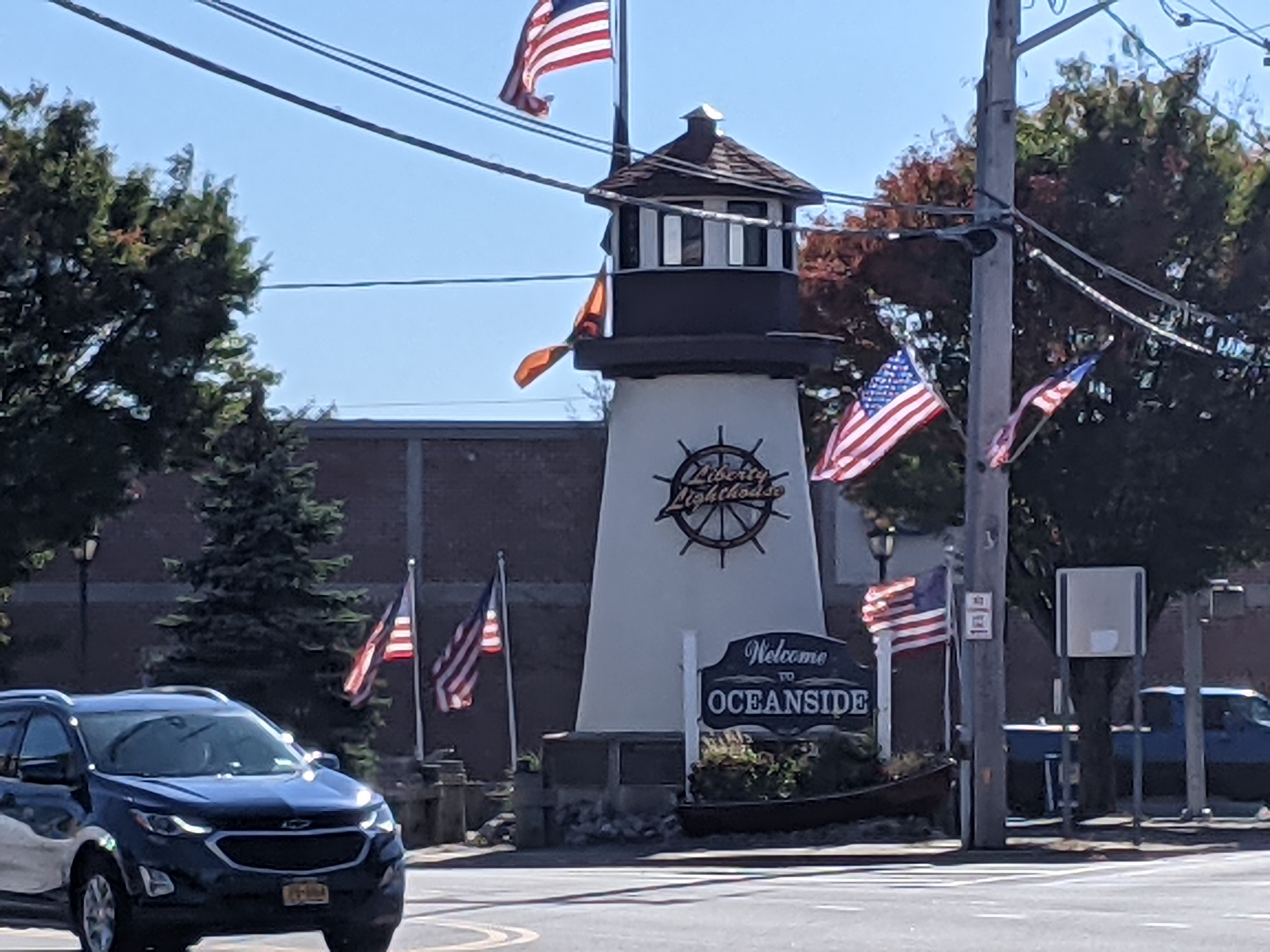
The famous lighthouse in the heart of Oceanside, in the middle of the junction of Long Beach Road and Lower Lincoln Avenue.

Continuing northeast, Long Beach Road eventually intersects Foxhurst Road (CR C82). It then reaches another junction one block to the north, where Lincoln Avenue branches off towards the northwest while Long Beach Road continues towards the north-northeast and entering Rockville Centre, soon intersecting Merrick Road (CR 27) and thence Sunrise Highway (NY 27) a few blocks further north. Long Beach Road then continues northeast, passing underneath the Long Island Rail Road's Babylon and Montauk Branches, and then reaching a junction with Oceanside Road (CR D75). Long Beach Road then continues northeast and reaches Lakeview Avenue (CR D28) two blocks to the north. Continuing north, Long Beach Road then gently meanders north-northeast, soon reaching DeMott Avenue (CR C57), and then continues north-northeast for some distance along the eastern edge of the Rockville Links Club, and soon entering South Hempstead.

After crossing into South Hempstead, CR D39 continues north-northeast, soon crossing underneath the Southern State Parkway and entering the Village of Hempstead. It then continues northeast for four blocks to Emery Road, thence veering north-northeast and continuing in that general direction to Ingraham Street, at which point Long Beach Road veers northeast for two blocks to its terminus at Baldwin Road (CR 55).

== History ==
By 1914, Long Beach Road had become one of America's most heavily traveled suburban roadways; at this time, the road traveled between Long Beach to the south and Merrick Road in Rockville Centre to the north. At that time, an average of 1,500 vehicles used the road on a typical Sunday. A modernization project was soon undertaken, and the road, which was only 50 feet (15 m) wide at the time, was soon widened.

The road was again widened by Nassau County in the 1920s in Oceanside, between Lincoln and Mott Avenues. The project saw this 1.5-mile (2.4 km) segment of Long Beach Road be widened from 50 feet (15 m) to 75 feet (23 m).

In the 1960s, the road was again rebuilt, this time in Island Park and Oceanside. As part of this project, a new bridge was erected over the Barnum Island Channel, just west of the older one; upon the newer span's opening, the new bridge was used for southbound traffic while the old bridge, which previously carried both all traffic, was reconfigured to carry northbound traffic. A 1.1-mile (1.8 km) section of Long Beach Road, between Waukena Avenue in Oceanside and Austin Boulevard in Island Park, was also widened as part of this reconstruction project.

In the 1980s, Nassau County proposed reconstructing a segment of the road in Rockville Centre, so as to eliminate a dangerous curve. The project was met with considerable opposition from local residents, and required Nassau County to acquire portions a number of front and side lawns of local homes through eminent domain, between Olive Boulevard and Westminster Road. Opposition caused the project to be deferred.

Peninsula Boulevard, along with all of the other county routes in Nassau County, became unsigned in the 1970s, when Nassau County officials opted to remove the signs as opposed to allocating the funds for replacing them with new ones that met the latest federal design standards and requirements, as per the federal government's Manual on Uniform Traffic Control Devices. Prior to being re-numbered as CR D39, Long Beach Road was designated as part of CR 1.

== Major intersections ==
The entire route is in Nassau County.

Location	mi	km	Destinations	Notes
Island Park–Long Beach line	0.00	0.00	Long Beach Bridge	Roadway continues south as Long Beach Boulevard (CR D38)
Island Park	0.30	0.48	Station Plaza	Access to the Island Park LIRR station
Island Park	0.41	0.66	Warwick Road (CR E47)	
Island Park	0.78	1.26	Island Parkway (CR D23)	
Barnum Island	1.31	2.11	Sherman Road	
Barnum Island	1.46	2.35	McCarthy Road	
Barnum Island	1.69	2.72	Austin Boulevard (CR C05)	
Oceanside	2.05	3.30	Daly Boulevard (CR C55)	
Oceanside	2.40	3.86	Mott Street (CR D64)	
Oceanside	2.63	4.23	Henrietta Avenue	
Oceanside	2.70	4.35	Waukena Avenue	
Oceanside	3.35	5.39	Atlantic Avenue (CR C04)	
Oceanside	3.95	6.36	Lower Lincoln Avenue (CR D35)	
Oceanside	4.10	6.60	Hawthorne Avenue	
Rockville Centre			Merrick Road (CR 27)	
Rockville Centre			NY 27 (Sunrise Highway)	At-grade intersection
Rockville Centre	4.88	7.85	Water Street	
Rockville Centre	4.99	8.03	Lakeview Avenue (CR D28)	
Rockville Centre	5.04	8.11	Seaman Avenue	
Rockville Centre	5.71	9.19	DeMott Avenue (CR C57)	Access to the Rockville Links Club, via DeMott Avenue westbound
South Hempstead	6.44	10.36	Cedar Street	
Village of Hempstead	7.62	12.26	Baldwin Road (CR 55)	
1.000 mi = 1.609 km; 1.000 km = 0.621 mi

== Long Beach Boulevard ==
Long Beach Boulevard is a major, 0.85-mile (1.37 km) road – and as the southern continuation of Long Beach Road (CR D39) – in the City of Long Beach, in Nassau County, New York, United States. It serves as one of the city's primary north–south thoroughfares, connecting the City of Long Beach (via the Long Beach Bridge and Long Beach Boulevard (CR D38)) at its southern end with Baldwin Road (CR 55) in the Village of Hempstead at its northern end.

The 0.49-mile (0.79 km) portion of Long Beach Boulevard between Park Avenue and the Long Beach Bridge (where it meets Long Beach Road) is owned by Nassau County and maintained by the Nassau County Department of Public Works as the unsigned Nassau County Route D38 (CR D38), while the portion between the Long Beach Boardwalk and Park Avenue is owned and maintained by the City of Long Beach.

Much like Long Beach Road, the county-owned portion of Long Beach Boulevard was previously designated as part of Nassau County Route 1, prior to Nassau County altering the route.

== See also ==
- List of county routes in Nassau County, New York
- Peninsula Boulevard
