= Covert Avenue =

Road on Long Island, New York

County Route C52
- Covert Avenue
- Covert Avenue, highlighted in red

Route information
- Maintained by NCDPW
- Length: 1.68 mi (2.70 km)

Major junctions
- South end: NY 24 in Elmont
- Stewart Avenue (CR 177)
- North end: NY 25 in New Hyde Park

Location
- Country: United States
- State: New York
- County: Nassau

Highway system
- County routes in New York; County Routes in Nassau County

Covert Avenue is a major, 1.68-mile (2.70 km) county highway in Nassau County, on Long Island, New York. Designated as the unsigned Nassau County Route C52, it connects Elmont and the Incorporated Village of New Hyde Park, is owned by Nassau County, and is maintained by the Nassau County Department of Public Works.

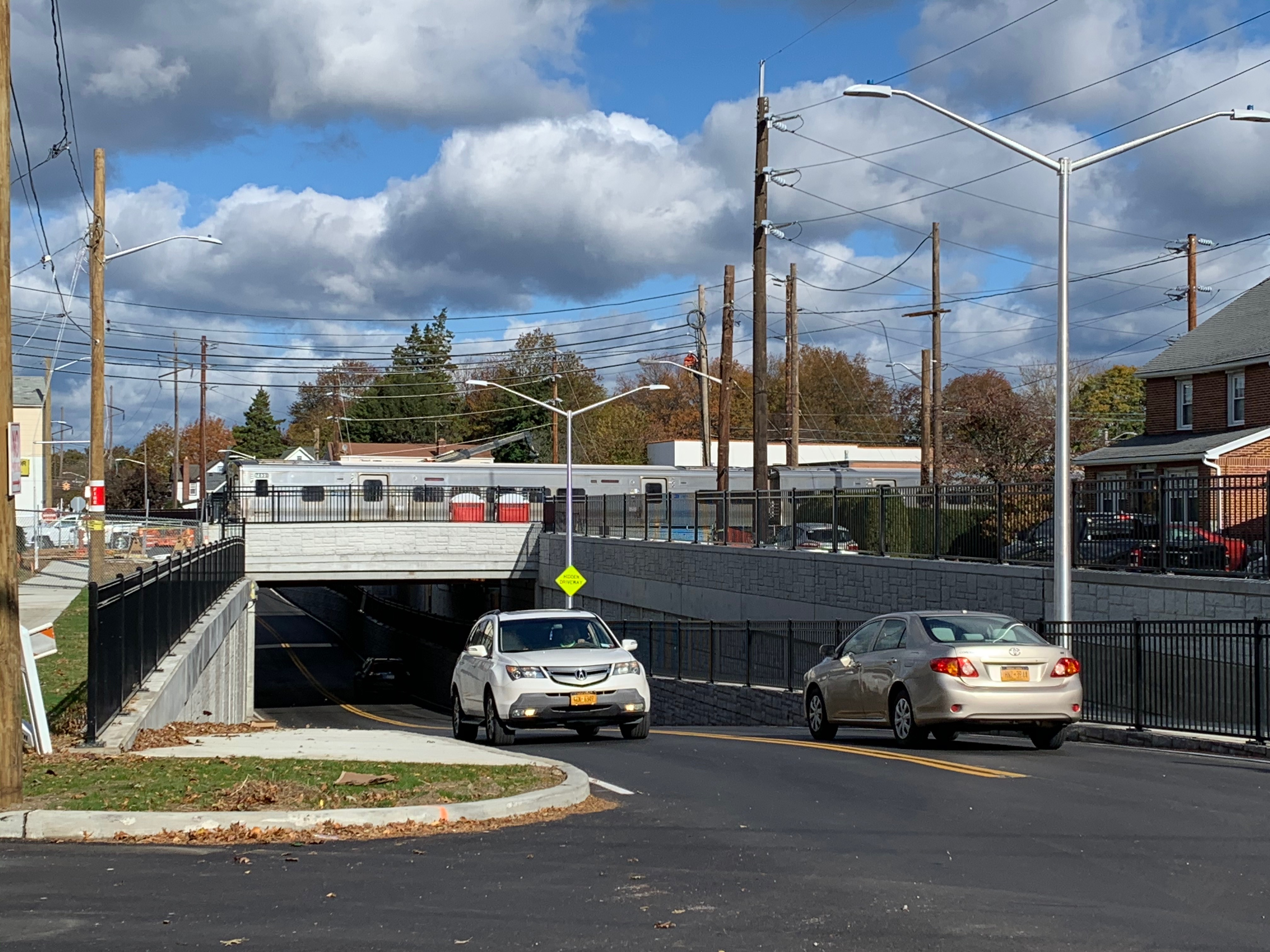
Covert Avenue's underpass underneath the Long Island Rail Road's Main Line in 2019, shortly after its completion.

== Route description ==
CR C52 begins at Hempstead Turnpike (NY 24) in Elmont, across the intersection from Meacham Avenue (CR D49). From there, it travels Northwest to Harrison Street, where it meets the Covert Avenue Spur (CR C52). From there, Covert Avenue turns to the north-northeast, continuing in that general direction for a distance, and then turns to the north-northwest, intersecting Reed Avenue. From there, CR C52 continues north-northwest to Tulip Avenue (CR E41), which it intersects adjacent to Sewanhaka High School. From there, Covert Avenue enters the Incorporated Village of Stewart Manor and turns to the north-northeast, forming the border between that village and the Incorporated Village of Floral Park. It then continues north-northeast, eventually crossing the Long Island Rail Road's Hempstead Branch at-grade. On the north side of the tracks, CR C52 forms the border between the incorporated villages of Stewart Manor and New Hyde Park until reaching Stewart Avenue (CR 177).

North of Stewart Avenue (CR 177), Covert Avenue enters the Incorporated Village of New Hyde Park, continuing north-northeast for a distance before curving to the north-northwest. CR C52 then crosses underneath the Long Island Rail Road's Main Line and continues north-northwest to its northern terminus at Jericho Turnpike (NY 25).

Covert Avenue, in its entirety, is classified as a minor arterial road by the New York State Department of Transportation.

== History ==
Covert Avenue was formerly designated as part of CR 174, with Meacham Avenue, prior to the route numbers in Nassau County being altered. It, like all other county routes in Nassau County, became unsigned in the 1970s, when Nassau County officials opted to remove the signs as opposed to allocating the funds for replacing them with new ones that met the latest federal design standards and requirements, as per the federal government's Manual on Uniform Traffic Control Devices.

In 2019, Covert Avenue's grade crossing with the Long Island Rail Road's Main Line was eliminated, as part of the Long Island Rail Road's Third Track Project. As part of the associated reconfiguration of Covert Avenue and the construction of its underpass, the road now passes underneath 2nd and 3rd Avenues, with one slip lane connecting to 2nd Avenue and another connecting to 3rd Avenue. The grade crossing elimination project required a six-month closure of that stretch of Covert Avenue, during which time the crossing was removed and the underpass was installed.

== Major intersections ==
| Location | mi | km | Destinations | Notes |
|---|---|---|---|---|
| Elmont | 0.00 | 0.00 | NY 24 (Hempstead Turnpike) – New York, East Farmingdale | Southern terminus of CR C52; continues south as Meacham Avenue (CR D49). |
| Elmont | 0.03 | 0.048 | Covert Avenue Spur (CR C52); Harrison Street | |
| Elmont–Floral Park– Stewart Manor tripoint | 1.09 | 1.75 | Tulip Avenue (CR E41) | Access to Sewanhaka High School. |
| New Hyde Park–Stewart Manor line | 1.19 | 1.92 | Stewart Avenue (CR 177) | |
| New Hyde Park | 1.68 | 2.70 | NY 25 (Jericho Turnpike) – New York, Orient Point | Northern terminus of CR C52. |
1.000 mi = 1.609 km; 1.000 km = 0.621 mi

== Covert Avenue Spur ==
County Route C52
- Location: Elmont
- Length: 0.05 mi (80 m)

Covert Avenue Spur (CR C52) is a 0.5-mile (0.80 km) spur of Covert Avenue in Elmont. It begins at the intersection of Covert Avenue (CR C52) and Harrison Street. It then runs southwest to its terminus at Hempstead Turnpike (NY 24).

The Covert Avenue Spur, in its entirety, is classified as a minor arterial road by the New York State Department of Transportation.

== See also ==
- List of county routes in Nassau County, New York
- Dutch Broadway
