= Salisbury, New York =

Salisbury is the name of some places in the U.S. state of New York:

- Salisbury, Herkimer County, New York, a town
- Salisbury (hamlet), Herkimer County, New York, a hamlet
- Salisbury, Nassau County, New York, a census-designated place (CDP)
