= New York State Route 102 =

Highway on Long Island, New York

New York State Route 102
- Front Street
- Map of Nassau County on Long Island with NY 102 highlighted red

Route information
- Maintained by NYSDOT and Nassau County
- Length: 4.61 mi (7.42 km)
- Existed: c. 1932–present

Major junctions
- West end: NY 24 in West Hempstead
- East end: NY 24 in East Meadow

Location
- Country: United States
- State: New York
- Counties: Nassau

Highway system
- New York Highways; Interstate; US; State; Reference; Parkways
← NY 101	→ NY 103

New York State Route 102 (NY 102) is an east–west state highway in Nassau County, New York, in the United States. It is little more than an alternate route of NY 24 through parts of the Town of Hempstead. NY 102 leaves NY 24 in West Hempstead and follows Front Street through the Village of Hempstead and Uniondale, before rejoining NY 24 in East Meadow.

The portion of NY 102 west of William Street is maintained by Nassau County and is unsigned, while the remainder of the highway is maintained by the New York State Department of Transportation and signed. NY 102 crosses under the Meadowbrook State Parkway, but has no connecting ramps to or from the parkway. It does, however, have a right-of-way for a formerly proposed eastbound lane.

NY 102 was assigned in the 1930s and has not been changed significantly since. The 2017 route log erroneously shows that NY 102's western terminus is at William Street in the village of Hempstead, where maintenance shifts from Nassau County to the state.

== Route description ==
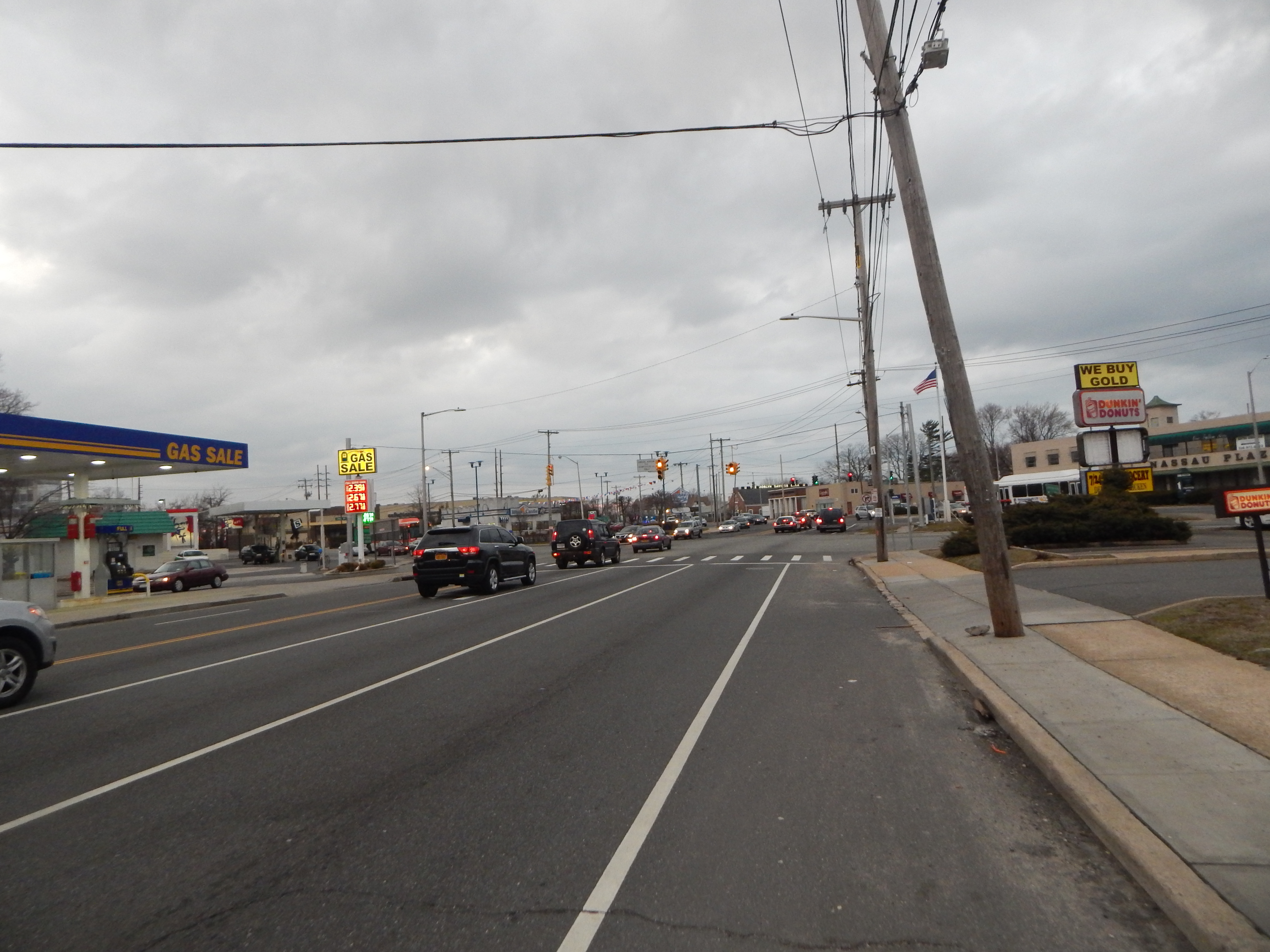
NY 102 westbound approaching NY 24

NY 102 begins at an intersection with NY 24 (Hempstead Turnpike) just east of the Long Island Rail Road's West Hempstead station in West Hempstead. The highway proceeds southeast through a commercial area along Front Street, a two-lane road maintained by Nassau County as County Route 106 (CR 106). The route bends east through the village of Hempstead, becoming residential for several blocks until Chasner Street. NY 102 continues northeast through Hempstead, passing several strip malls and businesses near Franklin Street. At the intersection with Main Street, NY 102 and Front Street proceed downhill near two churches and a cemetery as the four-lane residential street. After an apartment building, NY 102 crosses Clinton Street and Peninsula Boulevard at-grade.

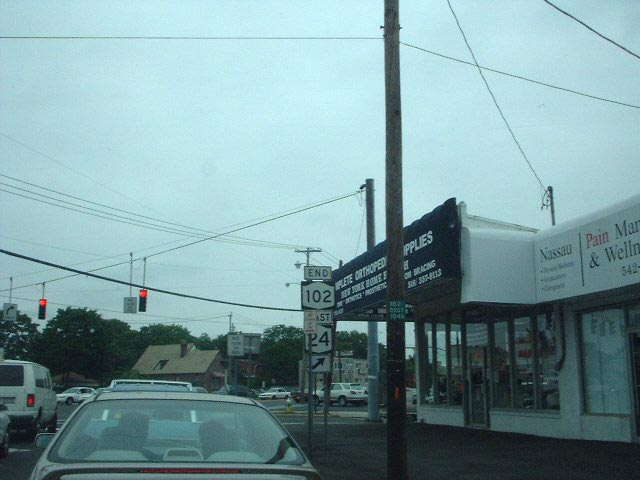
NY 102 eastbound at the junction with NY 24 in East Meadow

After Peninsula Boulevard, NY 102 continues eastward along Front Street, which becomes state-maintained at a junction with William Street. The route winds eastward through Hempstead for several blocks along the now four-lane road, passing numerous residences and apartment buildings. NY 102 bends northeast, intersecting with Uniondale Avenue in Uniondale. At this junction, the route becomes commercial in nature once again, crossing several blocks of businesses until Locust Avenue. Now two lanes, NY 102 continues northeast through Uniondale, crossing under the six lanes of the Meadowbrook State Parkway (with no interchange present). After the Meadowbrook, the route continues to bend northeast, passing through more residences and large commercial strips. A short distance later, the route intersects with Merrick Avenue, entering the Barnum Woods section of East Meadow. In Barnum Woods, NY 102 becomes a mix of residential and commercial as the two-lane main street. At the junction with Vincent Road, NY 102 leaves Barnum Woods and enters East Meadow.The route remains commercial and residential in nature, proceeding northeast past a long strip mall near East Meadow Avenue. After passing a large complex of stores, NY 102 intersects with NY 24 (Hempstead Turnpike) once again in East Meadow. This T-intersection serves as the eastern terminus of NY 102, whose right-of-way also ends.

== History ==
The state-maintained section of NY 102 was improved to state highway standards as part of a project contracted out by the state of New York on September 20, 1907. A total of 7.09 miles (11.41 km) of highway were rebuilt as part of the $81,000 project (equivalent to $2.83 million in 2024), including all of modern NY 105. The reconstructed roads were added to the state highway system on November 2, 1908, as unsigned State Highway 437 (SH 437). Both parts of SH 437 received posted route numbers in the early 1930s, with the Front Street segment becoming part of NY 102 c. 1932. The route also continued west over locally maintained roads in order to connect to NY 24 at both ends. NY 102's alignment has not been altered since.

The 2017 route log erroneously shows that NY 102's western terminus is at William Street in the village of Hempstead, where maintenance shifts from Nassau County to the state.

== Major intersections ==
The entire route is in Nassau County.

Location	mi	km	Destinations	Notes
West Hempstead–Hempstead line	0.00	0.00	NY 24 (Hempstead Turnpike)	Unsigned western terminus
East Meadow	4.61	7.42	NY 24 (Hempstead Turnpike)	Eastern terminus
1.000 mi = 1.609 km; 1.000 km = 0.621 mi

== See also ==
- List of state routes in New York
- List of county routes in Nassau County, New York
