= North Lynbrook, New York =

- Hamlet and census-designated place
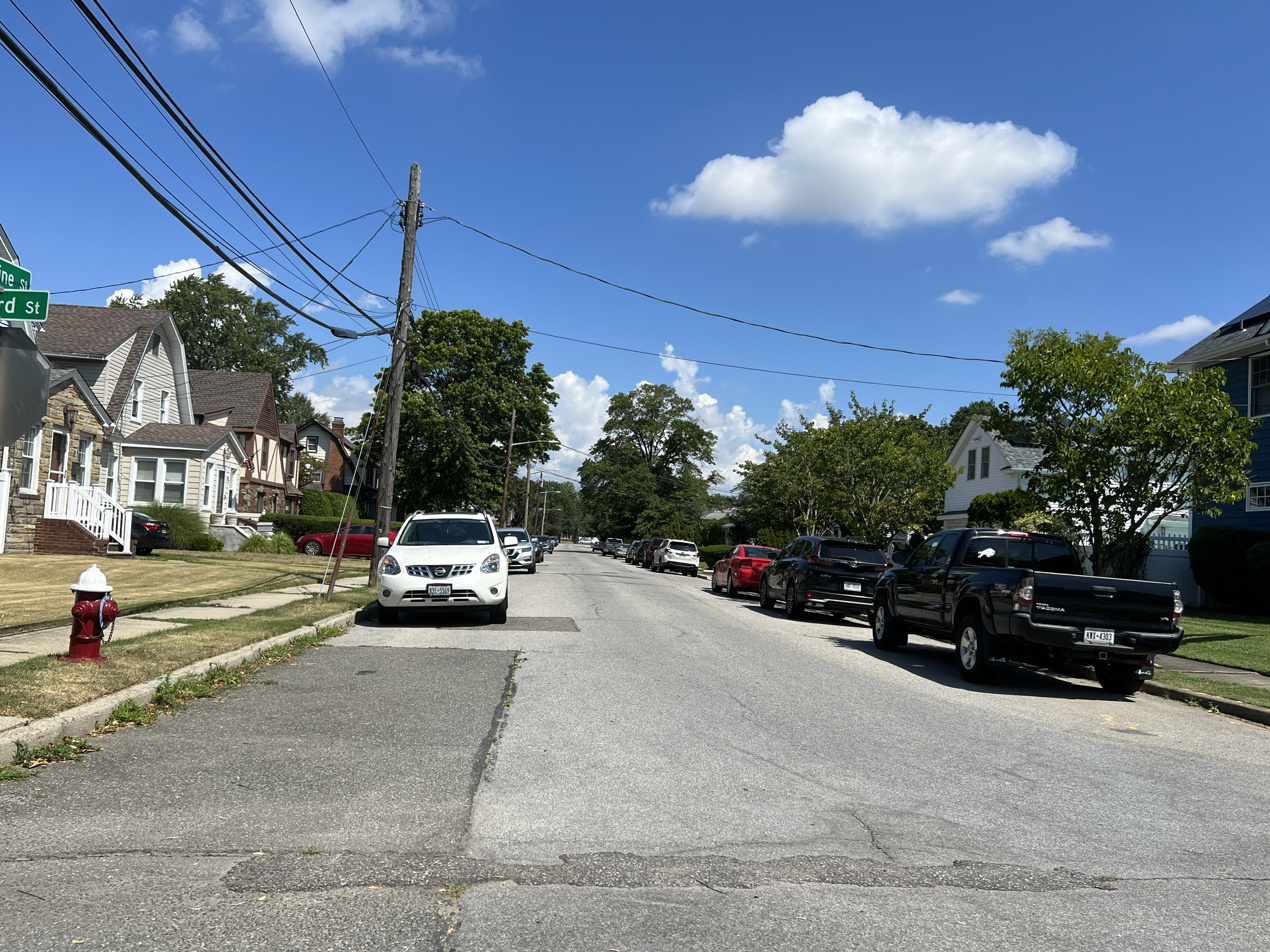
- A street in North Lynbrook in 2022

- Location in Nassau County and the state of New York

- Location on Long Island Location within the state of New York
- Coordinates: 40°40′4″N 73°40′23″W
- Country: United States
- State: New York
- County: Nassau
- Town: Hempstead
- Named for: Its location north of Lynbrook

Area
  - Total: 0.085 sq mi (0.22 km^{2})
  - Land: 0.085 sq mi (0.22 km^{2})
  - Water: 0 sq mi (0.00 km^{2})
- Elevation: 0 ft (0 m)

Population (2020)
  - Total: 747
  - Density: 8,633.4/sq mi (3,333.38/km^{2})
- Time zone: UTC-5 (Eastern (EST))
  - Summer (DST): UTC-4 (EDT)
- ZIP Code: 11563 (Lynbrook)
- Area codes: 516, 363
- FIPS code: 36-53231
- GNIS feature ID: 1852908

North Lynbrook is a hamlet and census-designated place (CDP) in the Town of Hempstead in Nassau County, on Long Island, in New York, United States. The population was 747 at the time of the 2020 census.

== History ==
When Malverne voted to become an incorporated village in 1921, the residents from North Lynbrook did not wish to become part of the new village and therefore remained an unincorporated hamlet under the jurisdiction of the Town of Hempstead.

North Lynbrook was first created for the 2000 United States Census.

The name of the hamlet reflects its geographic location north of the Incorporated Village of Lynbrook.

== Geography ==
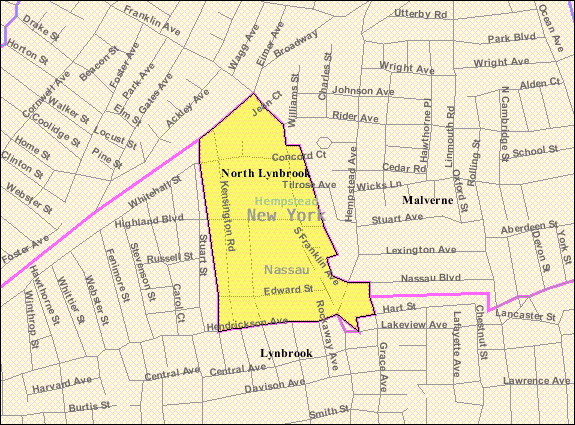
U.S. Census map of North Lynbrook

According to the United States Census Bureau, the CDP has a total area of 0.1 square miles (0.26 km^{2}), all land.

The hamlet is located between the Villages of Lynbrook and Malverne.

The ZIP code is Lynbrook's 11563. Fire protection is provided by the Malverne Volunteer Fire Department. Police protection falls under the jurisdiction of the Nassau County Police Department's 5th Precinct. And the community falls within the Malverne Union Free School District #12.

== Demographics ==
Historical population
Census	Pop.	Note	%±
2000	742		—
2010	793		6.9%
2020	747		−5.8%
U.S. Decennial Census

As of the U.S. census of 2020, there were 747 people, 266 households, and 232 families residing in the CDP. The population density was 7,988.9 inhabitants per square mile (3,084.5/km^{2}). There were 228 housing units at an average density of 2,454.8 per square mile (947.8/km^{2}). The racial makeup of the CDP was 61.3% White, 11.4% African American, 4.2% Asian, 47.2% some other race. 53.9% were Hispanic or Latino of any race.

There were 266 households, out of which 51.9% had children under the age of 18 living with them, 71.6% were married couples living together, 14.2% had a female householder with no husband present, and an estimated 32 non-families. 12.8% of all households were made up of individuals, and 12.8% had someone living alone who was 65 years of age or older. The average household size was 3.43 and the average family size was 3.65.

In the CDP, the population was spread out, with 35.9% under the age of 18, 61.2% were 21 years of age or older, and 22.8% who were 65 years of age or older. The median age was 39.1 years. For every 100 females over the age of 18, there were 76.9 males over the age of 18

The median income for a household in the CDP was $143,636, and the median income for a family was $144,933. About 3% of the population were below the poverty line. Zero people are on SNAP assistance, with a margin of error of 14.7%.

== Notable person ==
- Jeremiah Wood, former Lieutenant Governor of New York.

== See also ==
- Malverne Park Oaks
