= List of trails on Long Island =

Trails on Long Island include more than 200 miles (320 km) of paved and unpaved trails for mountain bikers and road cyclists. The New York Times has reported that "for bikers the lure of Long Island is unsurpassed."

One Long Island-based bicycle club, Concerned Long Island Mountain Bicyclists, also known as CLIMB, built a legal mountain bike trail network in New York City in Queens’ Cunningham Park. In 2007 the New York State Department of Transportation completed Long Island's first long-distance signed bike route from Cold Spring Harbor to the Orient Point ferry terminal.

Trails on Long Island in alphabetical order
Name	Notes
Bethpage Bikeway	Thirteen miles of paved, car-free mult-use trail. Northern point begins at Woodbury Road & Sunnyside Boulevard in Woodbury, continues through Trail View State Park, Bethpage State Park, and Massapequa Preserve along the length of the Bethpage State Parkway. Southern terminus is at Merrick Road.
Bethpage Mountain Bike Trail	Four miles from Bethpage State Park gatehouse, white triangles mark the off-road, marked loop trail.
Cathedral Pines County Park	Six mile single track mountain bike trail (9 miles (14 km) including the advanced black diamond designated sections). Maintained by CLIMB (Concerned Long Island Mountain Bicyclists). A Suffolk County Green Key card is required and there is a parking fee on weekends during the summer.
Calverton Mountain Bike Trail	Beginner to intermediate single track. 8-½ mile loop. 1-½ miles of optional advanced hill climbs. Helmets and eye protection are required. FREE NYS DEC Permit Required
Central Suffolk Bikeway	80 miles (130 km) of marked street route begins at Bethpage State Park and runs along Quaker Meeting House Road, Bethpage Road and Main Street to the Farmingdale (LIRR station). It then follows the railroad line into Riverhead. LIRR bike boarding passes are available for a $5 one-time fee.
Eastport Trail	Eight and one half mile off-road trail in Eastport. A free permit from the New York State Department of Environmental Conservation is required.
Governor Alfred E. Smith / Sunken Meadow State Park	Many miles of unmarked trails both north and south of 25a
Heckscher State Park	Sixteen miles of trails
Hempstead Lake State Park	Some unmarked trails around the lake that are shared with horses so be sure to yield to them. Stop and ask if ok to pass.
Jones Beach State Park	Eight and one half miles. This trail is regarded by some as the best on Long Island.
Kings Park Hike and Bike Trail	Follows an old railroad spur from Old Dock Road just east of Church Street to St. Johnland Road.
Long Island Motor Parkway	Former motor road
Nassau-Suffolk Greenbelt Mountain Bike Trail	Eight miles of unpaved, off-road National Recreation Trail marked for mountain bikes
Orient Beach State Park	The main 2.2-mile (3.5 km) bike path can be found mostly along Orient Park Road (NYS Ref. Route 900C), the 0.3-mile (0.48 km) Roy Latham Trail Loop east of the beach parking lots, and 2.4-mile (3.9 km) of unmarked trails west of the beach parking lots.
Rocky Point Mountain Bike Trail	13-mile (21 km) marked trail through the Natural Resources Management Area in the Pine Barrens. Helmets and eye protection are required. FREE NYS DEC Permit Required
Sears Bellows County Park	
Stillwell Woods Mountain Bike Trail	Regarded by some as the best off-road trail on Long Island.
Montauk County Park	
Trail View State Park	
Edgewood Oak Brush Plains Preserve	Miles of trails in Preserve managed by the NYS DEC. Helmets and eye protection are required.
