= Sound Shore Parkway =

Unbuilt highway on Long Island, New York

Sound Shore Parkway

Route information
- Maintained by NYSDOT
- Status: Never built
- Existed: 1965–1970s
- History: Formerly proposed parkway

Major junctions
- West end: NY 107 in Glen Cove
- East end: Sunken Meadow State Parkway or Caleb Smith State Park

Location
- Country: United States
- State: New York
- Counties: Nassau, Suffolk

Highway system
- New York Highways; Interstate; US; State; Reference; Parkways

The Sound Shore Parkway is an unbuilt parkway intended to run primarily across the North Shore of Long Island between the City of Glen Cove and the Town of Smithtown, in New York. Like Ocean Parkway on the South Shore, and Lake Ontario State Parkway in Upstate New York, it was meant to provide both recreational use and a seaview, in this case a view of the Long Island Sound. The parkway was to include two new state parks in Lattingtown and Eatons Neck.

== Proposed routing ==
The Sound Shore Parkway was to begin at New York State Route 107 (NY 107) in downtown Glen Cove, running northeast into Lattingtown. From there, it would have continued east through Bayville, where it was to encounter an interchange with the Bayville–Rye Bridge, and then towards a causeway crossing Cold Spring Harbor between Centre Island and Lloyd Harbor's Lloyd Neck in Suffolk County. Here, the Sound Shore Parkway would have intersected the proposed Caumsett State Parkway (which was to lead to the Bethpage State Parkway) at Caumsett State Park, then would have crossed a second causeway over Huntington Bay into Eatons Neck. At this point, the parkway was to swing southeast toward the Village of Asharoken, where it was to run along the narrow land strip connecting Eatons Neck to the rest of Long Island on elevated fill along the sound-side of the beach. A similar proposal was considered for the Asharoken–Norwalk Bridge and its approach to the unbuilt portion of the Babylon–Northport Expressway.

After passing along the coast in Fort Salonga, the Sound Shore Parkway was to have one of two eastern termini. The first proposed terminus was to be at Sunken Meadow State Park, along what is today Naples Avenue. Evidence of this can be found on the streetlights, which are designed for medians, but are used for the north side of the road and the parking fields along it instead. It was to connect with the existing Sunken Meadow State Parkway. The other one was an extension from Sunken Meadow State Park southeast into what is today Caleb Smith State Park in Smithtown, which may have even included an interchange with the unbuilt Northern State Parkway extension's Jericho Turnpike Spur.

== History ==
Robert Moses added this parkway to his master plan in 1965, despite retiring from the Long Island State Park Commission two years earlier. However, by the 1970s fiscal difficulties and a political climate of rampant anti-highway sentiment thwarted all attempts at construction of the parkway, as was the case with many proposed roadways in the New York Tri-State area.

== Proposed interchanges ==
| County | Location | mi | km | Destinations | Notes |
|---|---|---|---|---|---|
| Nassau | Glen Cove | | | NY 107 | Proposed western terminus |
| Suffolk | Lloyd Harbor | | | Caumsett State Parkway | Within Caumsett State Historic Park Preserve |
| Suffolk | Fort Salonga | | | Sunken Meadow State Parkway | Proposed eastern terminus in Sunken Meadow State Park |
| Suffolk | Smithtown | | | Caleb Smith State Park | Proposed terminus of a future extension |
1.000 mi = 1.609 km; 1.000 km = 0.621 mi
