= Caumsett State Historic Park Preserve =

State park in New York, United States

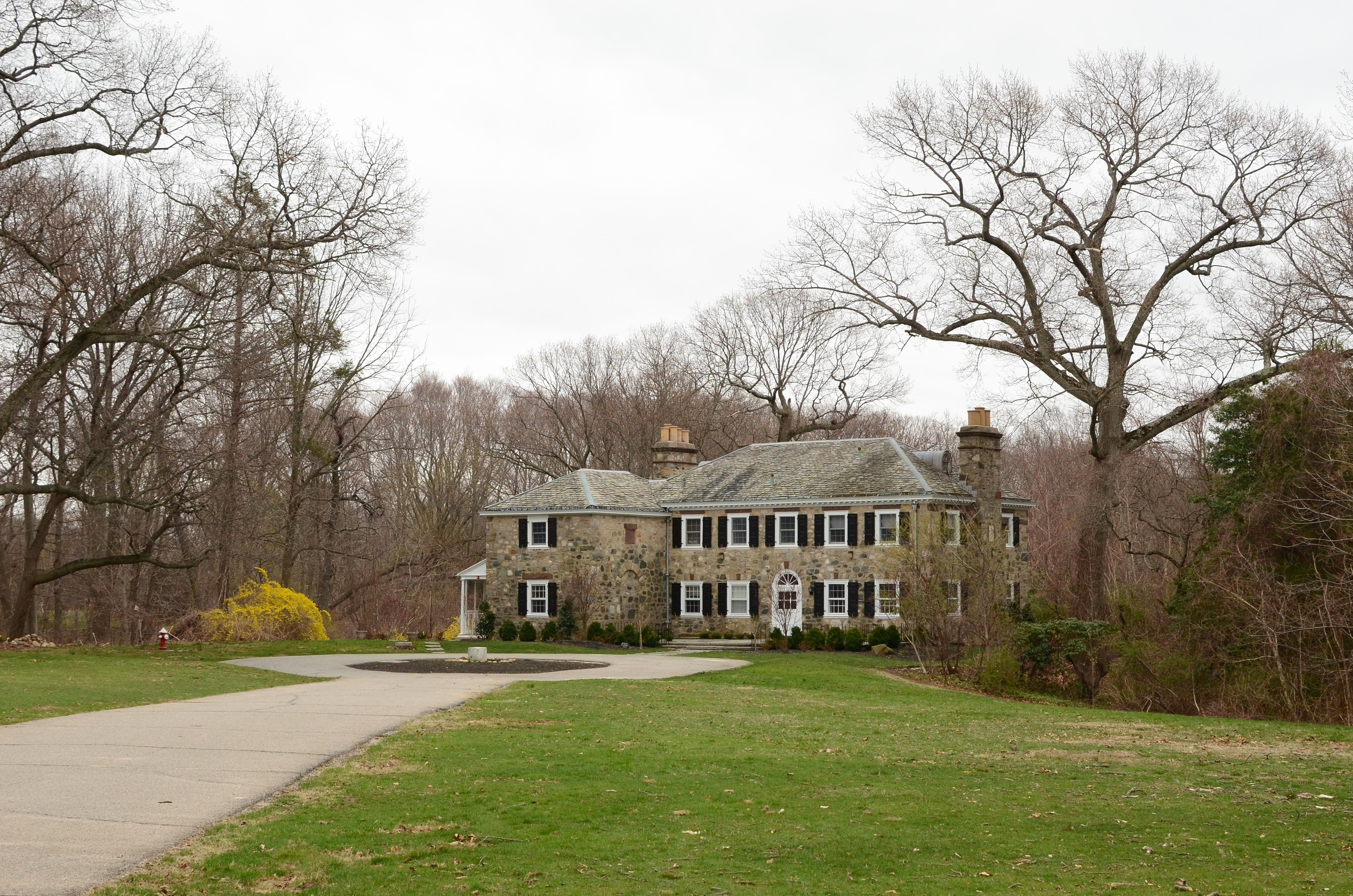
- Winter Cottage at Caumsett State Historic Park Preserve

- Location within New York
- Type: State park
- Location: 25 Lloyd Harbor Road; Lloyd Harbor, New York
- Coordinates: 40°55′39″N 73°28′18″W
- Area: 1,680 acres (680 ha)
- Created: 1961
- Operator: New York State Office of Parks, Recreation and Historic Preservation
- Visitors: 980,410 (in 2024)
- Open: All year
- Website: Caumsett State Historic Park Preserve
- Marshall Field, III, Estate
- U.S. National Register of Historic Places
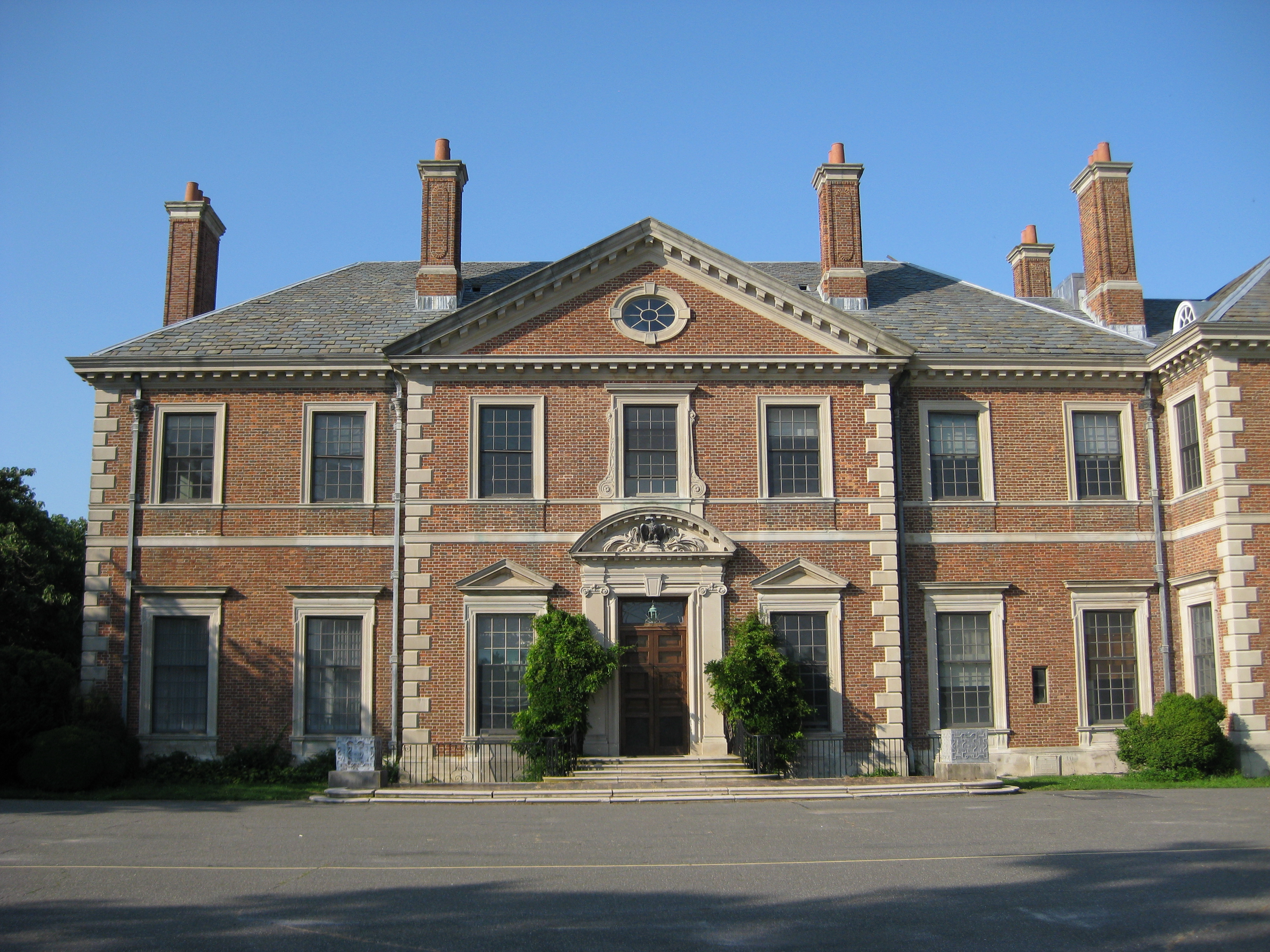
- Caumsett Hall in 2009
- Coordinates: 40°55′39″N 73°28′18″W
- Built: 1925
- Architect: Pope, John Russell; Holden, McLaughlin & Associates
- Architectural style: English Revival
- NRHP reference No.: 79001633
- Added to NRHP: April 30, 1979

Caumsett State Historic Park Preserve is a state park on Lloyd Neck, a peninsula extending into the Long Island Sound, in the Village of Lloyd Harbor, New York, United States. It is operated by the New York State Office of Parks, Recreation and Historic Preservation.

The 1,680-acre (680 ha) park covers the former Marshall Field III estate, developed in the 1920s and was listed on the National Register of Historic Places in 1979. Most of the grounds of the former Seminary of the Immaculate Conception were acquired in 2026. Much of the park is managed as a nature preserve to protect high-quality bird habitats.

== History ==
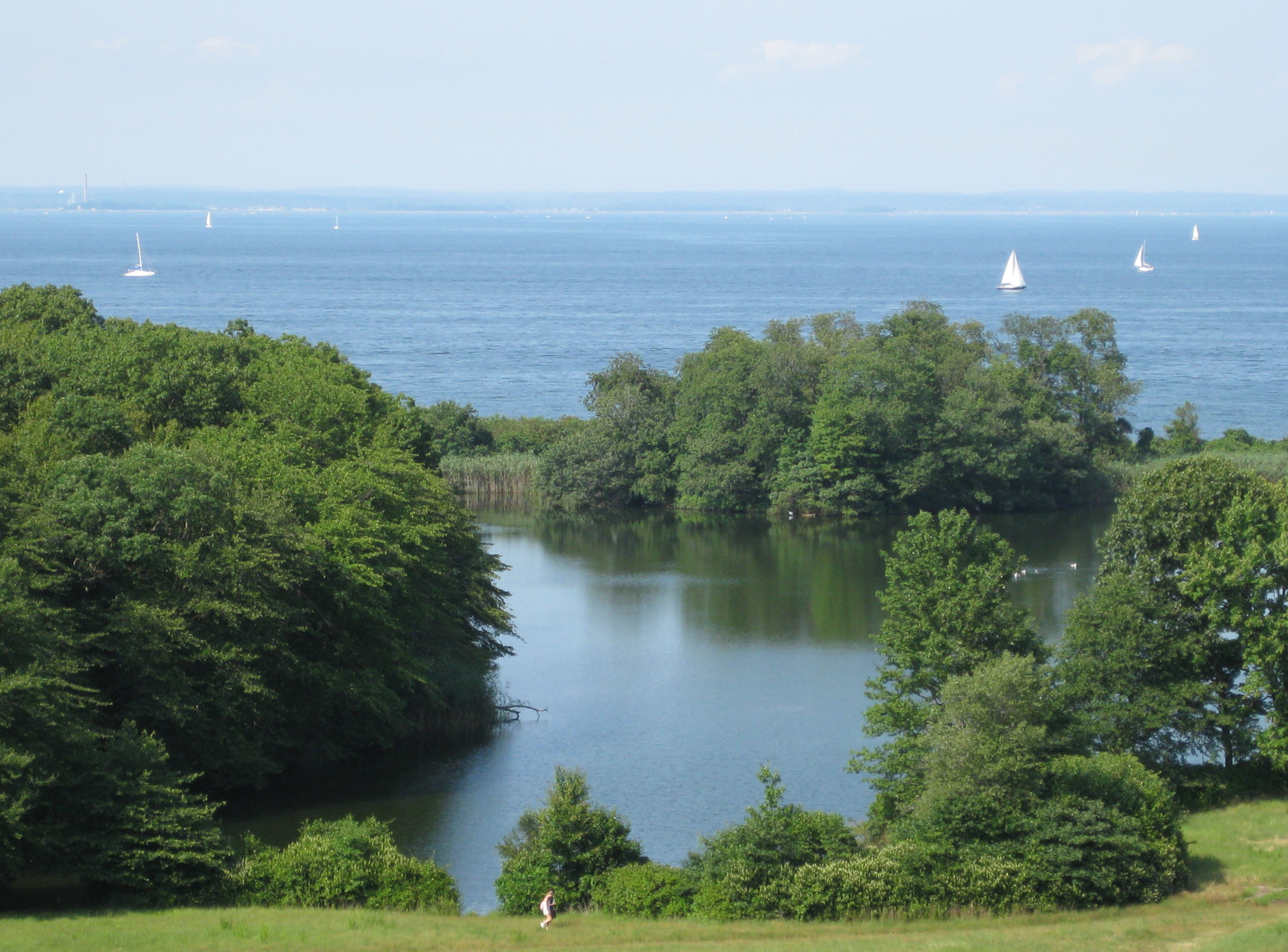
View of Long Island Sound from the park

Marshall Field III bought the property in 1921 and had an estate house built in 1925, one of the largest estates of the Gold Coast mansions. Field named the property "Caumsett", after the Matinecock tribe's original name for the peninsula meaning "place by a sharp rock".

The 1,426-acre (577 ha) Marshall Field III estate was purchased by New York State for $4 million on February 3, 1961, and became a state park. The former estate was listed on the National Register of Historic Places in 1979.

In May 1961, plans were made to create Caumsett State Parkway, a northern extension of Bethpage State Parkway, to provide access to the park. Although right-of-way was acquired, the parkway was never built. A portion of this land was later used to create Cold Spring Harbor State Park and Trail View State Park.

In January 2026, 180 acres (73 ha) of the former Seminary of the Immaculate Conception, located directly south of the existing park, were acquired by the New York State Office of Parks, Recreation and Historic Preservation. This addition encompasses 12 acres (4.9 ha) of estuarine and marine wetlands as well as bluffs and steep slopes adjacent to Lloyd Neck Harbor.

== Park description ==
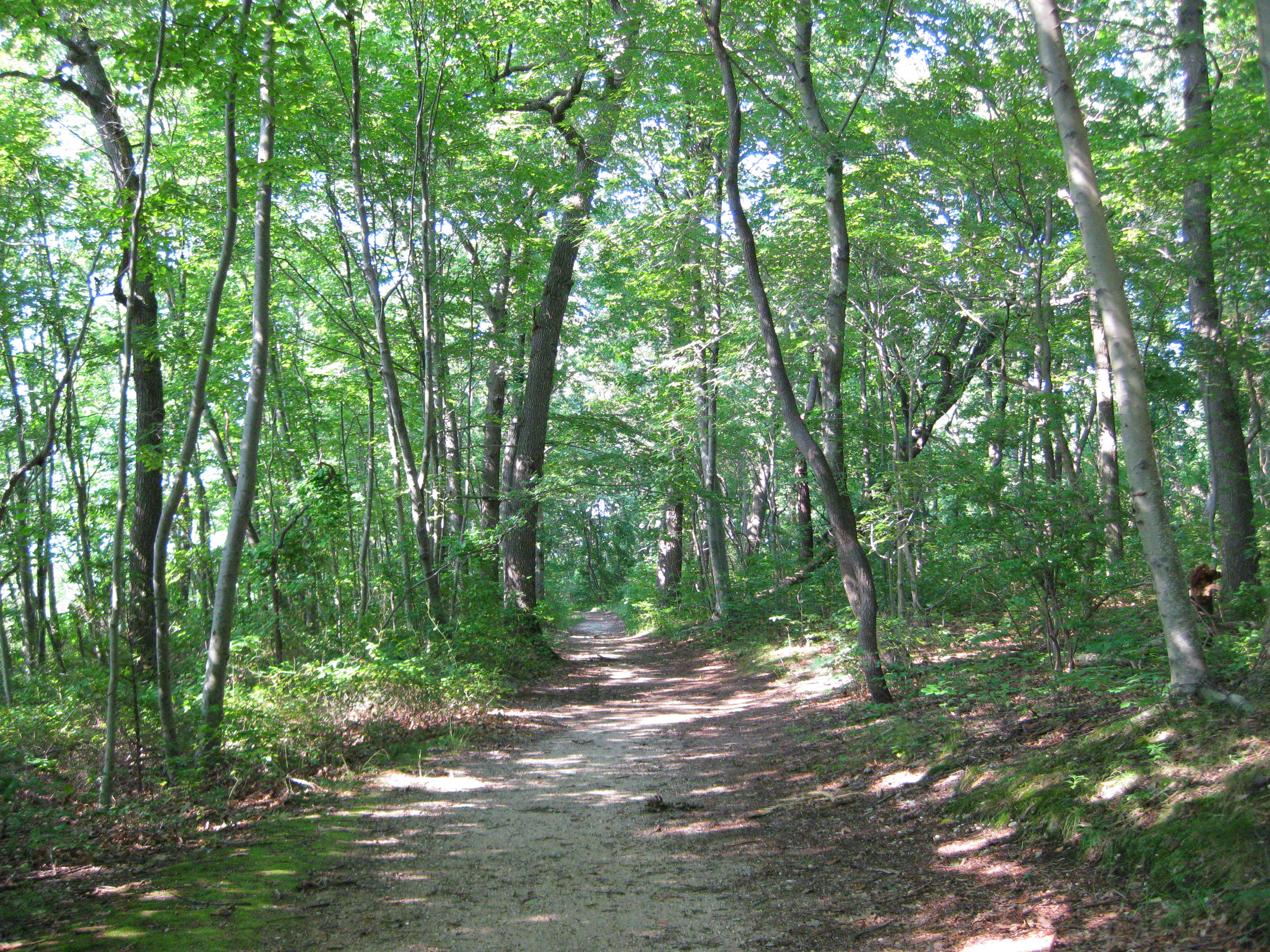
A path through the woods at Caumsett State Historic Park Preserve

The historic buildings within Caumsett State Historic Park Preserve are used for a variety of activities; former polo barns are used for equestrian education and services, while other buildings host environmental education programs and the Lloyd Harbor Historical Society.

Much of the remainder of the park is maintained as a nature preserve, with a focus on conservation of bird habitat. The "Caumsett Bird Conservation Area" was established in 2006 and comprises approximately 1,255 acres (508 ha) of the state park, two-thirds of which is forested. The remainder includes a variety of habitats, such as salt marsh and maritime beach. The designated area protects high-quality habitat that supports breeding populations of several species listed as threatened or endangered in New York State, including piping plovers, common terns, and least terns; many additional migratory species also make use of the protected landscape.

The park allows for recreation such as horse-riding, fishing, jogging, hiking, biking, and cross-country skiing. Scuba diving is also allowed by permit.

== See also ==
- List of New York state parks
- List of New York State Historic Sites
- National Register of Historic Places listings in Suffolk County, New York
