= Caumsett State Parkway =

Unbuilt highway on Long Island, New York

Caumsett State Parkway
- Proposed route highlighted in red

Route information
- Maintained by NYSDOT
- Status: Never built; much of right-of-way repurposed as parkland
- History: Formerly proposed parkway

Major junctions
- South end: Bethpage State Parkway / Northern State Parkway in Plainview
- North end: Caumsett State Historic Park in Lloyd Harbor

Location
- Country: United States
- State: New York
- Counties: Nassau, Suffolk

Highway system
- New York Highways; Interstate; US; State; Reference; Parkways

The Caumsett State Parkway (also known as the Caumsett Parkway) was a proposed controlled-access parkway on the North Shore of Long Island, New York, between Plainview in Nassau County and the Caumsett State Historic Park in Lloyd Harbor, Suffolk County.

The parkway was intended to link the Caumsett State Historic Park in Lloyd Harbor to a northerly extension of the Bethpage State Parkway at the Northern State Parkway in Plainview—and would have linked Caumsett State Historic Park with Bethpage State Park via the extended Bethpage State Parkway. Much of the unbuilt parkway's right-of-way has since been transformed into parks with trails and other recreational amenities.

== Route description ==
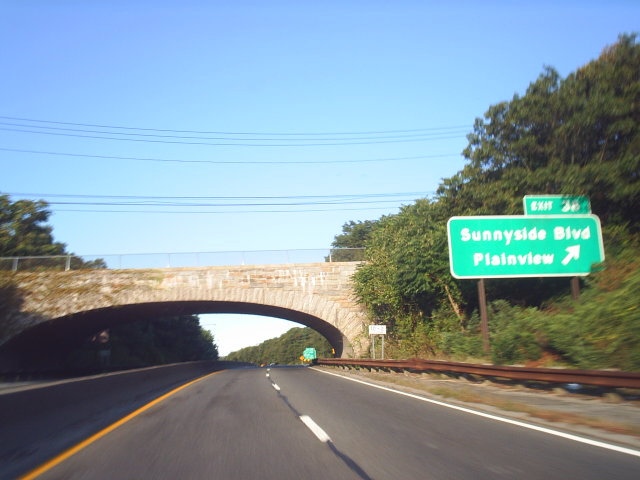
Exit 38 on the Northern State Parkway in Plainview, near where the Caumsett State Parkway was to meet it and the Bethpage State Parkway

Beginning at a full cloverleaf interchange with the Northern State Parkway and the formerly proposed northern terminus of Bethpage State Parkway, just east of exit 38 on the Northern State Parkway, the Caumsett State Parkway would have curved to the northwest. It then would have crossed Woodbury Road at a half-diamond interchange, then run parallel to it as it encountered a partial cloverleaf interchange with New York State Route 25 (NY 25, Jericho Turnpike). After this, the parkway would have moved further away from Woodbury Road, then gone under Syosset–Woodbury Road before passing over the Port Jefferson Branch of the Long Island Rail Road. From there the road was to curve slightly to the east.

After entering Suffolk County, it was to go over NY 108 (Harbor Road) before paralleling it and running along the east coast of Cold Spring Harbor. As NY 108 ends, it would have then run parallel to NY 25A (Main Street), and then cross over and connect to it in an unorthodox interchange.

From there, the Caumsett Parkway would continue north along the coast, soon entering the incorporated village of Lloyd Harbor. It would then curve right into the interior of West Neck. The Caumsett Parkway would then cross over West Neck Road without an interchange, then bridge over Lloyd Harbor as it enters Lloyd Neck, soon thereafter entering the Caumsett State Historic Park. Within the park, the Caumsett Parkway would then terminate at a traffic circle, and possibly connect to the proposed Sound Shore Parkway if that highway were also to be built.

== History ==
The right-of-way for the parkway was acquired in the 1960s, some of which was used to create Trail View State Park and Cold Spring Harbor State Park.

On May 20, 1961, a new parkway was proposed by the Long Island State Park Commission to connect the Northern State Parkway to the proposed Caumsett State Park, the site of a wildlife refuge and arboretum. The parkway would be constructed as a northern extension of the Bethpage State Parkway, using filled land to traverse Cold Spring Harbor. It also required the condemning of a Standard Oil Company tank farm to avoid demolishing high-priced homes, which were to be taken via the three alternate routes proposed. In 1965, the LISPC proposed that the four-lane parkway wind through Cold Spring Harbor and enter the village of Lloyd Harbor. Three years later, however, the LISPC said all they proposed was a scenic and landscaped two-lane road in the future. Conservationists of the Caumsett estate worried that the plans were too vague; furthermore, they believed that Caumsett should not be turned into a major-use facility like that of Jones Beach State Park on the southern shore.

Extending the Bethpage Parkway northward from was a requirement for building the new parkway, and four new interchanges were proposed for the Bethpage Parkway. The first, exit B5, would be at NY 135 (Seaford–Oyster Bay Expressway). With this new interchange, the traffic circle with Plainview Road in Bethpage State Park would be eliminated. Other junctions included a diamond interchange for Plainview Avenue and Bethpage State Park, a full cloverleaf interchange with Old Country Road, and a partial cloverleaf interchange with the Long Island Expressway (then-NY 495). North of there, the new Caumsett exits would be a full cloverleaf interchange with the Northern State Parkway, a diamond interchange with NY 25 (Jericho Turnpike) and an interchange with NY 25A and NY 108. After the NY 25A interchange, the parkway would continue north along the east coast of Cold Spring Harbor before curving inland before crossing Lloyd Harbor, and then ultimately enter Caumsett State Park, ending at a traffic circle at the southern end of the park.

There have been subsequent proposals to utilize the unbuilt Caumsett Parkway's right-of-way. In 1987, the Long Island Greenbelt Trail Conference proposed that the right-of-way for the Caumsett become part of a new Greenbelt trail. In September 2002, Governor George Pataki announced the opening of Trail View State Park—a new, linear 400-acre (160 ha) state park using the rights-of-way for the Caumsett Parkway and the unbuilt extension of the Bethpage Parkway; the park also included a 7.4-mile (11.9 km) trail.

== Proposed interchanges ==
County	Location	mi	km	Exit	Destinations	Notes
Nassau	Plainview				Bethpage State Parkway south	Would continue south as the Bethpage Parkway
Nassau	Plainview			C1	Northern State Parkway	
Nassau	Woodbury			C2	NY 25 (Jericho Turnpike)	
Suffolk	Cold Spring Harbor			C3	NY 25A (Main Street) / NY 108 (Harbor Road)	
Suffolk	Lloyd Harbor				Caumsett State Historic Park	Northern terminus
1.000 mi = 1.609 km; 1.000 km = 0.621 mi

== See also ==
- Ponquogue Parkway
- Robert Moses
- Sunken Meadow State Parkway

== Sources ==
- The Caumsett Foundation; Field, Marshall (2016). Caumsett: The Marshall Field III Gold Coast Estate. Images of America. Charleston, South Carolina: Arcadia Publishing. pp. 195–196. ISBN 978-1-4396-5637-2.
