= Cold Spring Harbor State Park =

Park in New York

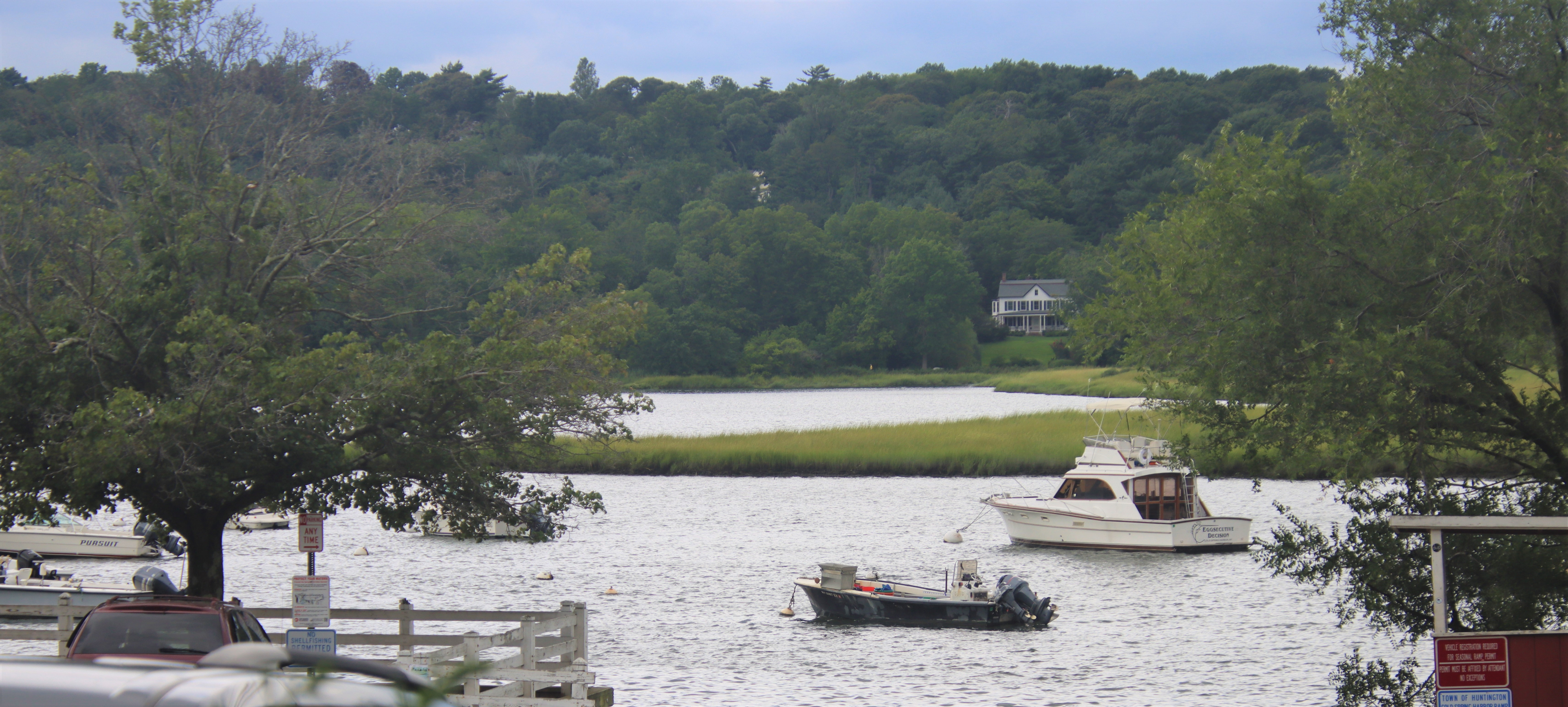

- Location within New York Location within the United States
- Interactive map of Cold Spring Harbor State Park
- Type: State park
- Location: 95 Harbor Road; Cold Spring Harbor, New York
- Coordinates: 40°51′47″N 73°27′36″W
- Area: 47 acres (19 ha)
- Created: 2000
- Operator: New York State Office of Parks, Recreation and Historic Preservation
- Visitors: 293,002 (in 2024)
- Open: All year
- Website: Cold Spring Harbor State Park

Cold Spring Harbor State Park is a 47-acre (19 ha) state park located on New York State Route 25A in the Town of Huntington in Suffolk County, New York. The hilly park opened in 2000 and offers scenic views of Cold Spring Harbor on the north shore of Long Island.

== History ==
Cold Spring Harbor State Park occupies land purchased by New York State in the 1960s; it was originally intended to host part of a bridge to Connecticut or a parkway proposed by Robert Moses. After the bridge failed to materialize, the land was largely forgotten although it remained under the jurisdiction of the New York State Department of Parks, Recreation and Historic Preservation. The unused parcel was eventually brought to the attention of state officials by a librarian seeking space for a new library in Cold Spring Harbor, and was officially dedicated as a state park in 2000.

== Description ==
The 47-acre (19 ha) park, consisting mostly of steep wooded slopes, is intended to retain a natural, undeveloped character. It facilitates passive recreation including hiking, birdwatching (including great horned owls and red-tailed hawks), snowshoeing, and cross-country skiing.

The park is linked to Bethpage State Park by Trail View State Park, a 7.4-mile-long (11.9 km) linear park built on the former right-of-way for the Caumsett State Parkway and the proposed northern extension of the Bethpage State Parkway.

The park is filled with various types of wildlife like deer, fox and eagles.

== See also ==
- List of New York state parks
