= Lenox Hills =

Coordinates: 40.737°N 73.449°W

Lenox Hills is a neighborhood on the northern edge of Farmingdale, Long Island, New York, near the Melville and Old Bethpage areas.

== Description ==
The first subdivision there was established in the late 1920s on land adjacent to an 18-hole golf course then known as the Lenox Hills Country Club. During the Great Depression of the 1930s, this golf course was purchased by the State of New York, enlarged and renamed Bethpage State Park. The Lenox Hills Country Club course is now known as the Green Course of the Park.
