= Bethpage Bikeway =

14.9 mile bike trail on Long Island, New York

The Bethpage Bikeway is a 14.9-mile-long bike trail on Long Island, New York and goes through multiple state parks, notably Bethpage State Park.

== History ==
In the 1930s, the New York State Department of Transportation built the Bethpage State Parkway to help residents of nearby New York City access Long Island parks. In the 1970s, the Department of Transportation built the original 6.8-mile path from the Massapequa Preserve to the Bethpage State Park playground and parking area to connect the preserve and Massapequa. The Department of Transportation did not build any new paths north of this point; however, bikers and trail walkers walked north on a dirt path. In 2011, 2012, and 2013, the Department of Transportation rewarded a contract to begin new work on the trail, adding an additional 5.7 miles from the playgrounds and parking area north to nearby Syosset through the Trail View State Park right of way. The reasoning behind the paved extension is to "further provide non-motorized access to recreational and employment facilities along the length of the bikeway and to improve air quality by converting some motorized traffic into non-motorized traffic."

== Route ==
The southern terminus of the bikeway is at the northeast corner of Merrick Road and Ocean Avenue in the Massapequa Preserve, although barely marked with signage. It continues north and briefly runs alongside the Massapequa Creek until it empties out onto the southern side of Sunrise Highway. As the trail filters into the highway mid-block, trail users generally cross at Lakeshore Boulevard. From there, the trail continues north inside the preserve, east of the creek and its several ponds; here there are several spurs onto Lake Shore Drive. The trail then crosses Linden Street and curves over the Southern State Parkway onto the eastern side of the Bethpage State Parkway. It continues like this for the entirety of the parkway at which point it enters Bethpage State Park.

Inside the park, the trail runs alongside Plainview Road, and then the Picnic Polo Road. The path has a spur running into the parking lot for the playground area. This is where the 1970s-era path ends and the 2010s-era path begins. Here, the trail has mile markers every 0.1 mile and follows Jo Ann Drive and South Park Drive, with many other dirt paths, notably the Long Island Greenbelt Trail paths and the Concerned Long Island Mountain Bikers (CLIMB) trails.

After crossing Haypath Road, the trail enters Trail View State Park and steadily stays on the eastern side of the park before reaching the northern "end" of the park, crossing Washington Avenue at Executive Drive. It briefly runs alongside the western side of Washington Avenue before hitting the North Service Road of the Long Island Expressway where it runs adjacent to it until its intersection with Sunnyside Boulevard. The trail finally ends at Woodbury Road and Sunnyside Boulevard's Extension; however, the trail also ends at Woodbury Road and Manetto Hill Road.
