= Trail View State Park =

State park in New York, US

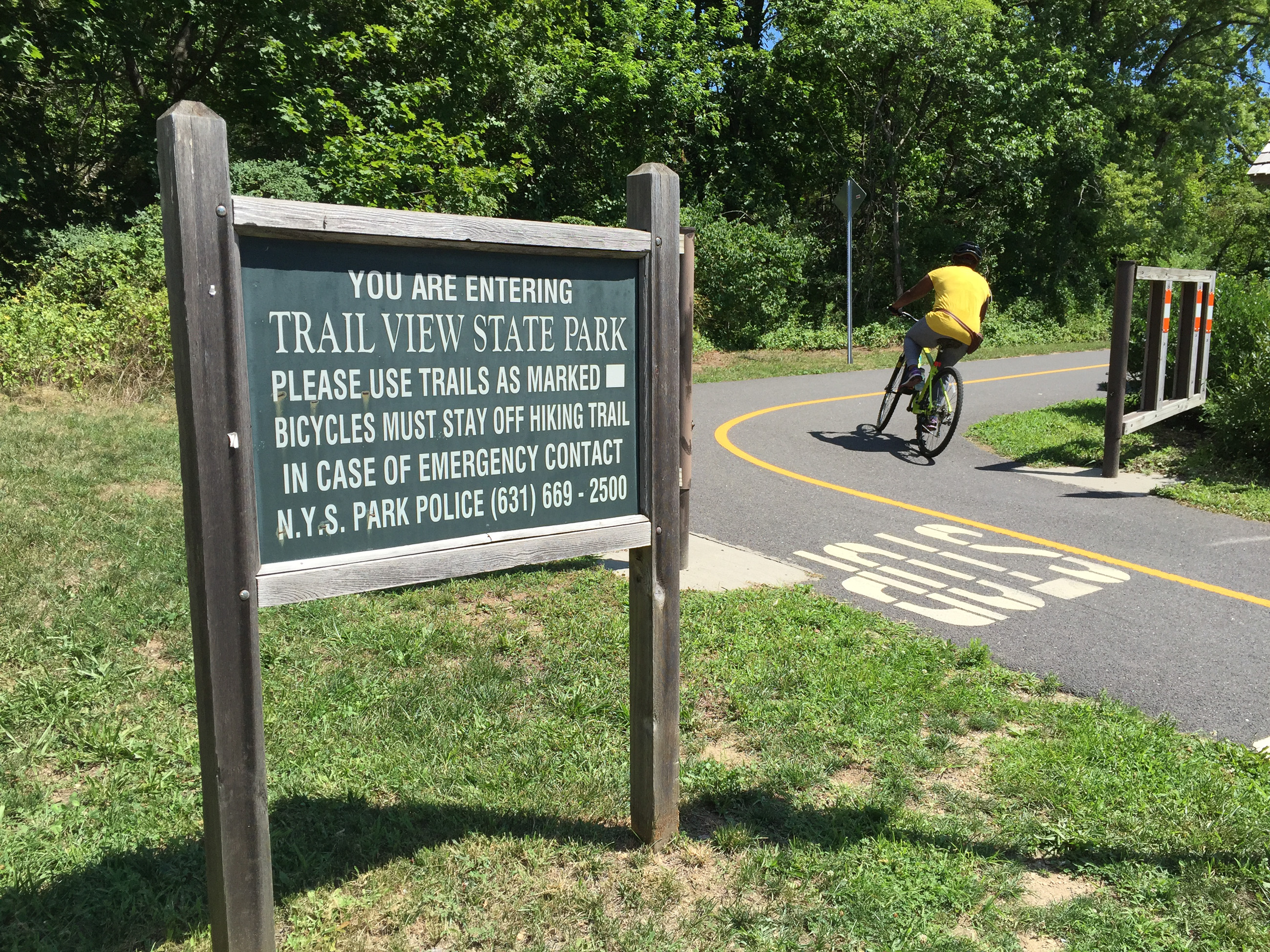

- Location within New York Location within the United States
- Type: State park
- Location: 8101 Jericho Turnpike; Woodbury, New York
- Coordinates: 40°48′48″N 73°28′13″W
- Area: 454 acres (1.84 km^{2})
- Created: 2002
- Operator: New York State Office of Parks, Recreation and Historic Preservation
- Visitors: 138,005 (in 2014)
- Open: All year
- Website: Trail View State Park

Trail View State Park is a 454-acre (1.84 km^{2}) state park located on Long Island on the Nassau–Suffolk county border in New York. The linear park, created in September 2002, runs between Bethpage State Park and Cold Spring Harbor State Park.

== History ==
Trail View State Park occupies the former right-of-way for the proposed northern extension of the Bethpage State Parkway and Caumsett State Parkway, on land acquired by New York State in the 1960s. Formerly under the management of the New York State Department of Transportation, the parcel was opened as a state park in September 2002.

In late 2012 or early 2013, the paved, multi-use Bethpage Bikeway was extended through Trail View State Park.

== Description ==
The 7.4-mile-long (11.9 km) linear park connects Bethpage State Park and Cold Spring Harbor State Park, covering an area of 454 acres (1.84 km^{2}). It contains a portion of the Nassau/Suffolk Greenbelt Trail, in addition to a portion of the Bethpage Bikeway. The park offers hiking and biking, a nature trail, a bridle path, bird watching, and cross-country skiing.

== See also ==
- List of New York state parks
