= Sunken Meadow State Park =

State park in New York, United States

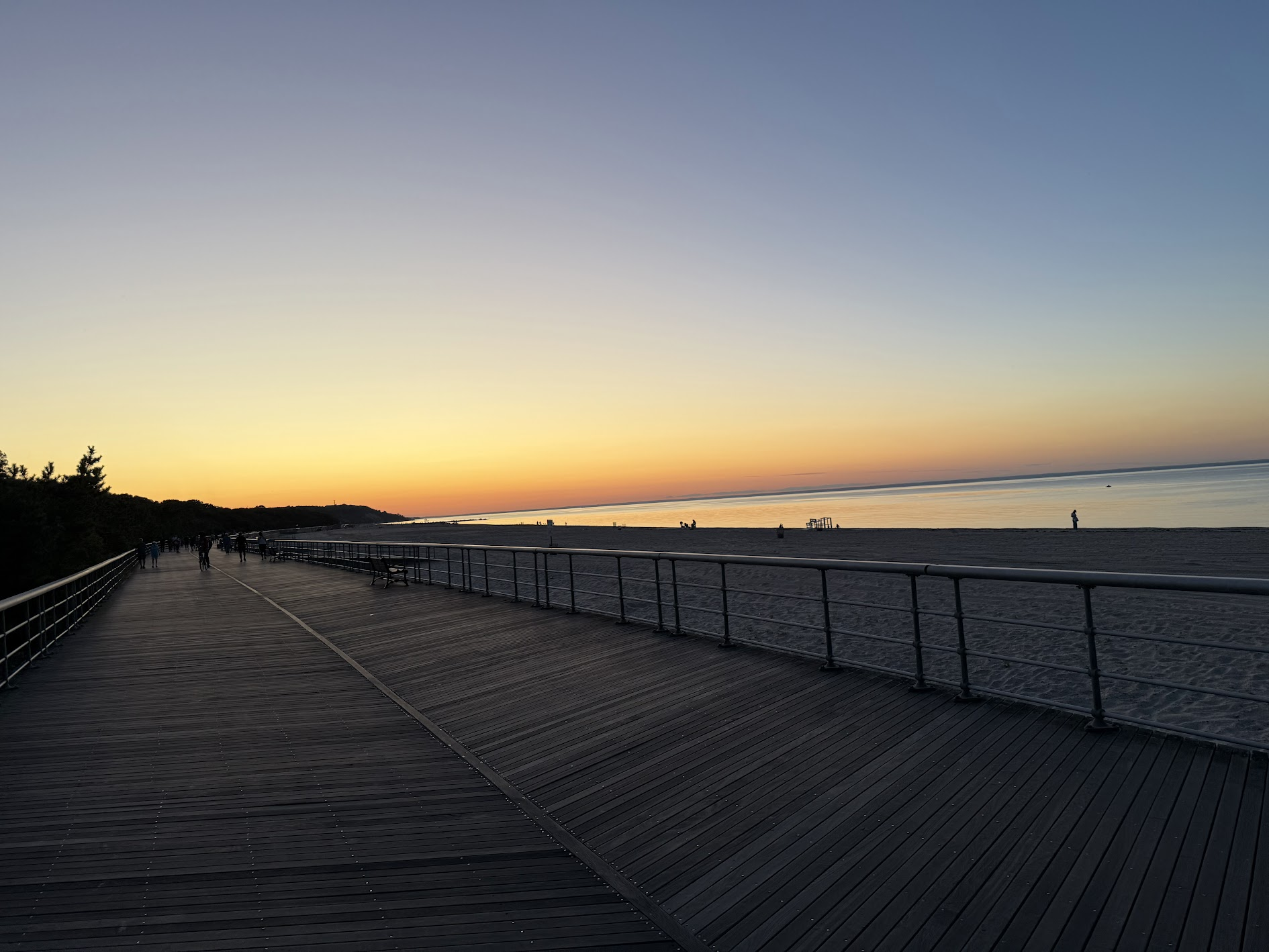
- Sunset along the beachfront boardwalk at Sunken Meadow State Park

- Location within New York Location within the United States
- Type: State park
- Location: Rte. 25A and Sunken Meadow Parkway; Kings Park, New York
- Nearest city: Kings Park, New York
- Coordinates: 40°54′41″N 73°15′29″W
- Area: 1,288 acres (5.21 km^{2})
- Created: 1926
- Operator: New York State Office of Parks, Recreation and Historic Preservation
- Visitors: 3,528,980 (in 2024)
- Open: All year
- Website: Sunken Meadow State Park

Sunken Meadow State Park, also known as Governor Alfred E. Smith State Park, is a 1,287-acre (5.21 km^{2}) state park located in the Town of Smithtown in Suffolk County, New York on the north shore of Long Island. The park, accessible via the Sunken Meadow State Parkway, contains the 27-hole Sunken Meadow State Park Golf Course and the Sunken Meadow Nature Center.

== Park description ==
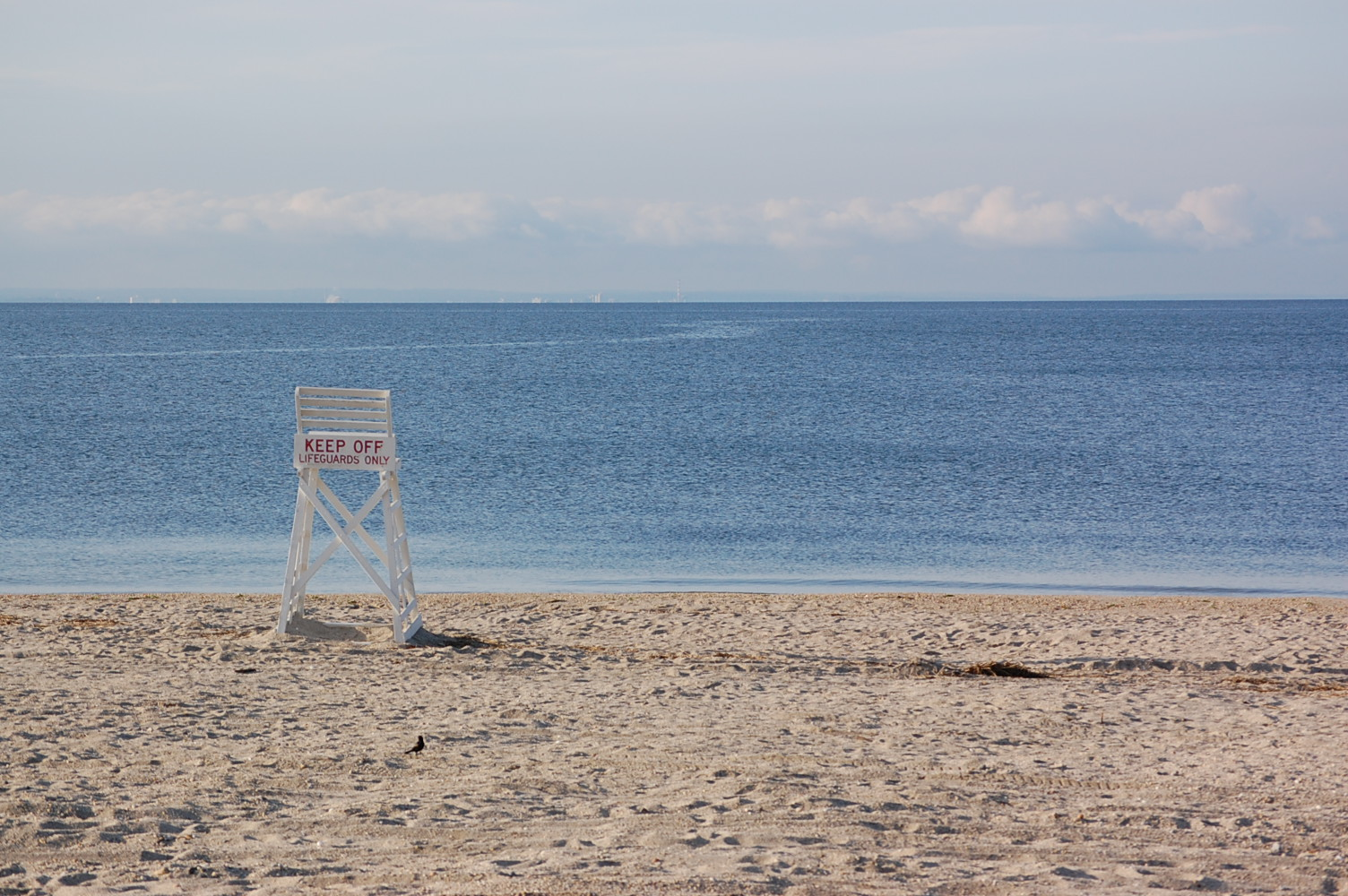
Beach at Sunken Meadow State Park

Sunken Meadow State Park is open year-round from sunrise to sunset. The park's features include three miles (4.8 km) of beaches on the Long Island Sound, a three-quarters-mile-long (1.2 km) boardwalk, six miles (9.7 km) of hiking trails, and facilities for biking, horseback riding, watersports, and general recreation. Playgrounds, softball fields, and soccer fields are also available at the park.

Located in Sunken Meadow State Park is the Sunken Meadow Nature Center, which offers dozens of educational programs throughout the year.

A wedding and event facility known as "The Pavilion" is available during the summer.

The Sunken Meadow State Park Golf Course features 27 holes that may be played as either nine or 18 holes, in addition to a driving range and putting green. The first two nine-hole courses, Red and Green, were built in 1962, followed by the Blue Course in 1964. All three courses were designed by Alfred Tull. A bar and snack food restaurant near the course is available and open to the public year round.

The park's grounds are used as a venue for cross country running, and host competitions for cross country teams from local high schools and runners' clubs. The five-kilometer course, featuring the deliberately named "Cardiac Hill", is regarded as one of the most difficult cross country courses in the US.

The 31-mile (50 km) Long Island Greenbelt Trail connects Sunken Meadow State Park with Heckscher State Park.

== Marsh Habitat Restoration ==
In the 1950's, an earthen berm was constructed across the Sunken Meadow Creek to allow vehicular traffic, as well as control mosquito populations; This blocked tidal flow from entering the creek, allowing invasive plants such as Phragmites australis, to thrive and for pollution to build up.

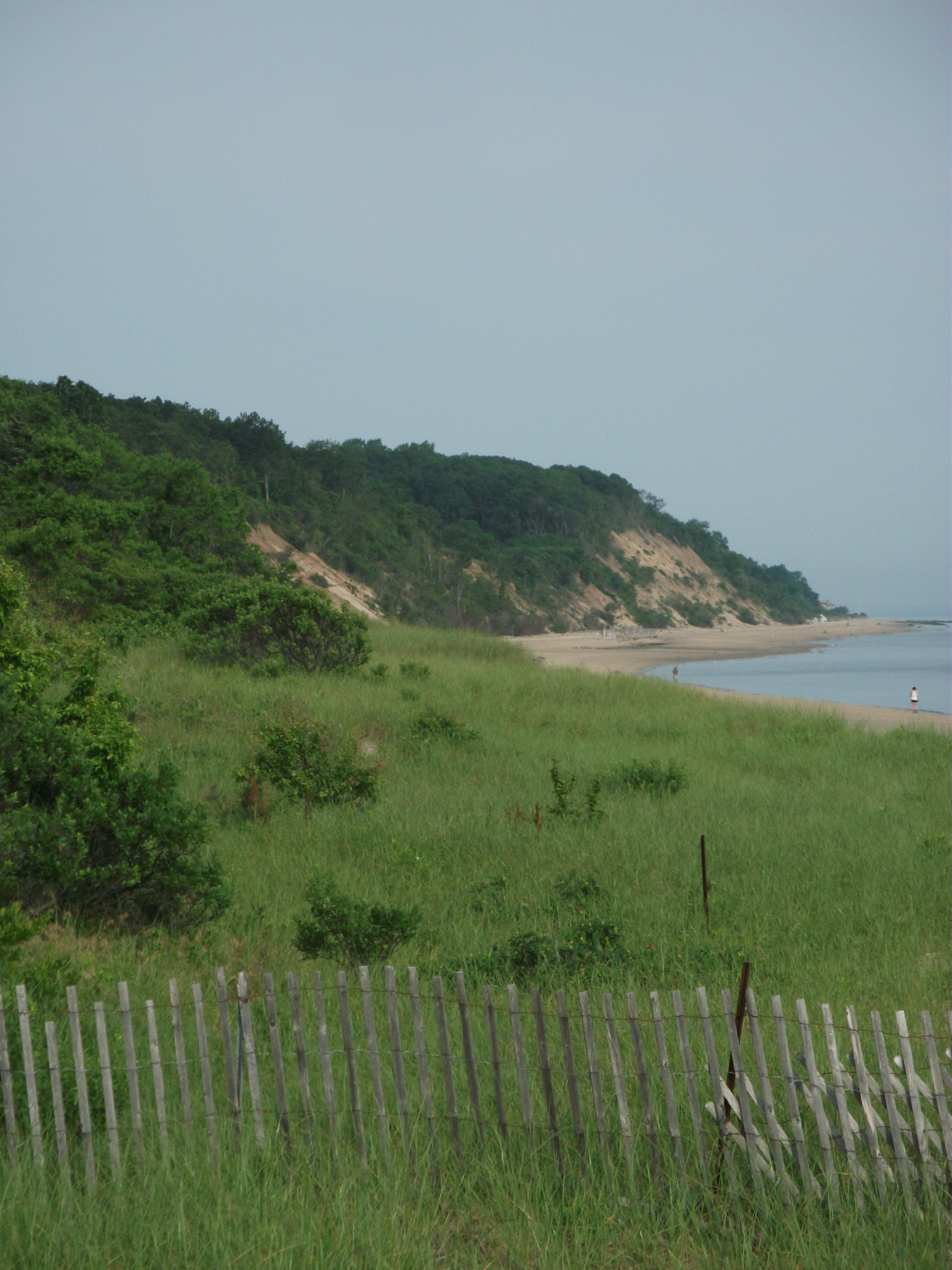
Steep coast and beach at Sunken Meadow State Park

In 2008, New York State Parks, along with other organizations such as the New York State Department of Environmental Conservation, the Long Island Sound Study, Save the Sound, and the National Fish and Wildlife Service, began researching the possibility of replacing the berm with a foot-bridge. In 2011, official planning commenced; in October 2012, the bridge design was complete.

On October 29th, 2012, then Hurricane Sandy brought strong winds, storm surge, and rainfall to the Long Island region, which blew out the berm. This caused tidal flow to be restored for the first time in decades and for invasive species to be pushed out of the marsh and native species to be reintroduced.

Construction of the bridge was completed in October 2013, one year after Hurricane Sandy. Numerous restoration projects have taken place since, such as planting projects for smooth cordgrass (Spartina alterniflora) and erosion control projects. In 2025, the National Audubon Society received a $1.5 million grant award from the National Wildlife and Fish Service to aid in marsh restoration. This project focuses on removing invasive plants, elevation enhancement, and hydrological repair.

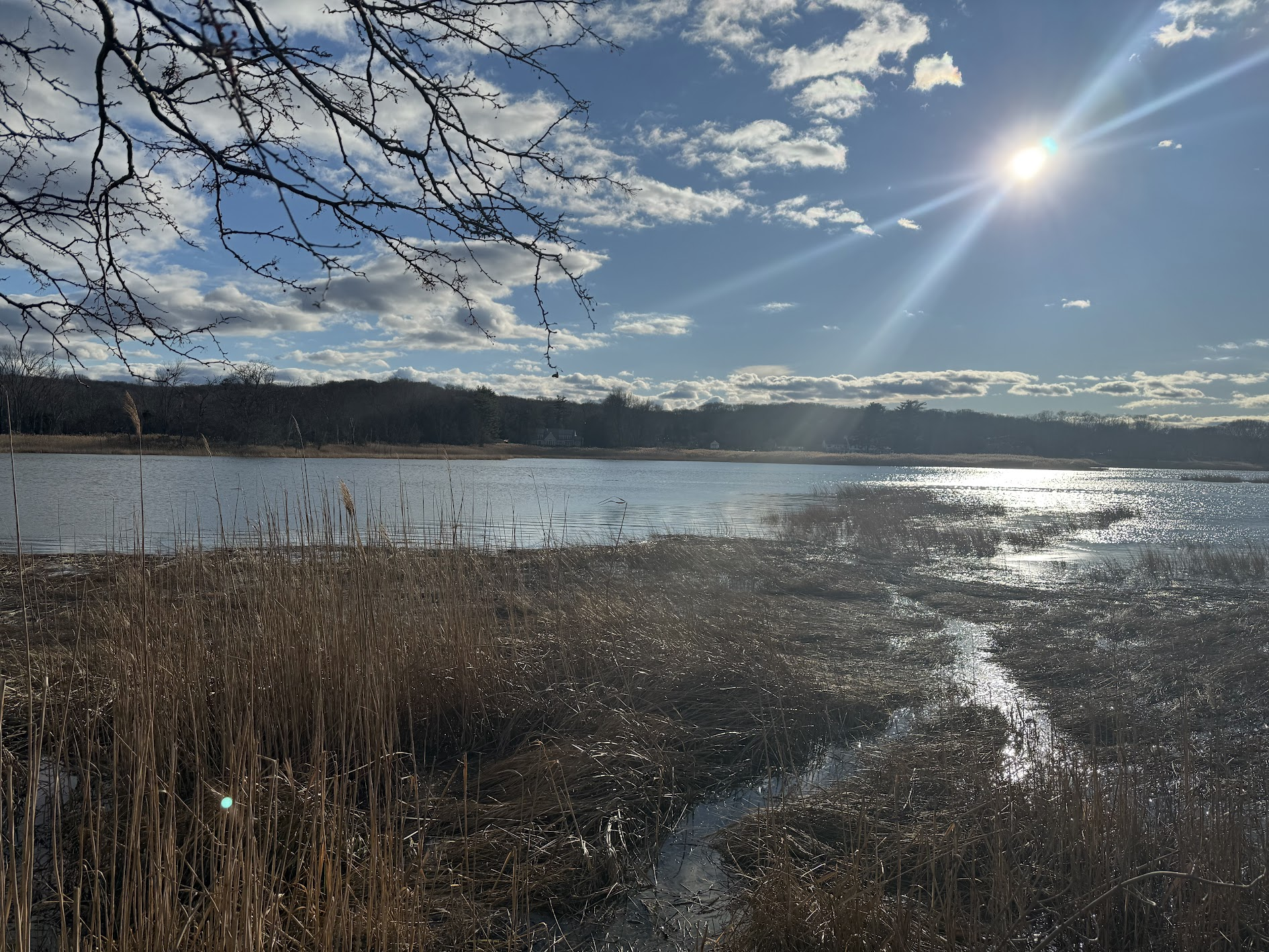
Marsh restoration habitat as it appears in January 2026

Since restoration began, the marsh has become an educational hub, with both the Sunken Meadow Nature Center and the Western Suffolk BOCES Outdoor Learning Lab using the area to teach students about habitat restoration and native wildlife.

== See also ==
- List of New York state parks
