= Bethpage State Parkway =

Highway in New York, United States

Bethpage State Parkway
- Philip B. Healey Memorial Parkway
- Bethpage State Parkway highlighted in red

Route information
- Maintained by NYSDOT and NYS OPRHP
- Length: 2.49 mi (4.01 km)
- Existed: November 14, 1936–present
- Restrictions: No commercial vehicles

Major junctions
- South end: Southern State Parkway in North Massapequa
- NY 24 at the Plainedge–South Farmingdale line
- North end: Plainview Road in Bethpage

Location
- Country: United States
- State: New York
- Counties: Nassau

Highway system
- New York Highways; Interstate; US; State; Reference; Parkways

The Bethpage State Parkway (or simply the Bethpage Parkway) is a 2.49-mile (4.01 km) controlled-access parkway in Nassau County on Long Island, New York, in the United States. It begins at a trumpet interchange with the Southern State Parkway in North Massapequa and serves Boundary Avenue, NY 24, and Central Avenue before terminating at a traffic circle with Plainview Road and a local park road in Bethpage State Park. The parkway is designated as New York State Route 907E (NY 907E), an unsigned reference route. It is also ceremoniously designated as the Philip B. Healey Memorial Parkway for Assemblyman Philip B. Healey (1921–1996).

The Bethpage State Parkway was first proposed by Robert Moses and the Long Island State Park Commission in 1924 to help get people from New York City to parks in Nassau and Suffolk counties. Construction of the parkway began in 1934, and the highway opened on November 14, 1936, along with the Laurelton Parkway (part of the Belt Parkway system) in Queens. The new parkway cost $1.04 million (1936 USD) to construct. Moses proposed extending the Bethpage in both directions, south to Merrick Road via Massapequa State Park and north to the Northern State Parkway, where it would meet the unbuilt Caumsett State Parkway. Although neither proposal was constructed, bike paths leading away from both directions of the parkway have been constructed or are under construction. Several scaled-back proposals to extend the Bethpage north have been proposed, including an extension to NY 25A in Cold Spring Harbor and another to NY 135 (the Seaford–Oyster Bay Expressway) in Bethpage.

A bike path was constructed along the Bethpage State Parkway in the 1970s using the alignment once reserved for the southern extension and land along the east side of the current parkway. The Bethpage Bikeway, was extended from its original northern terminus to the Long Island Rail Road station in Syosset. The extension also uses part of the former Long Island Motor Parkway.

== Route description ==
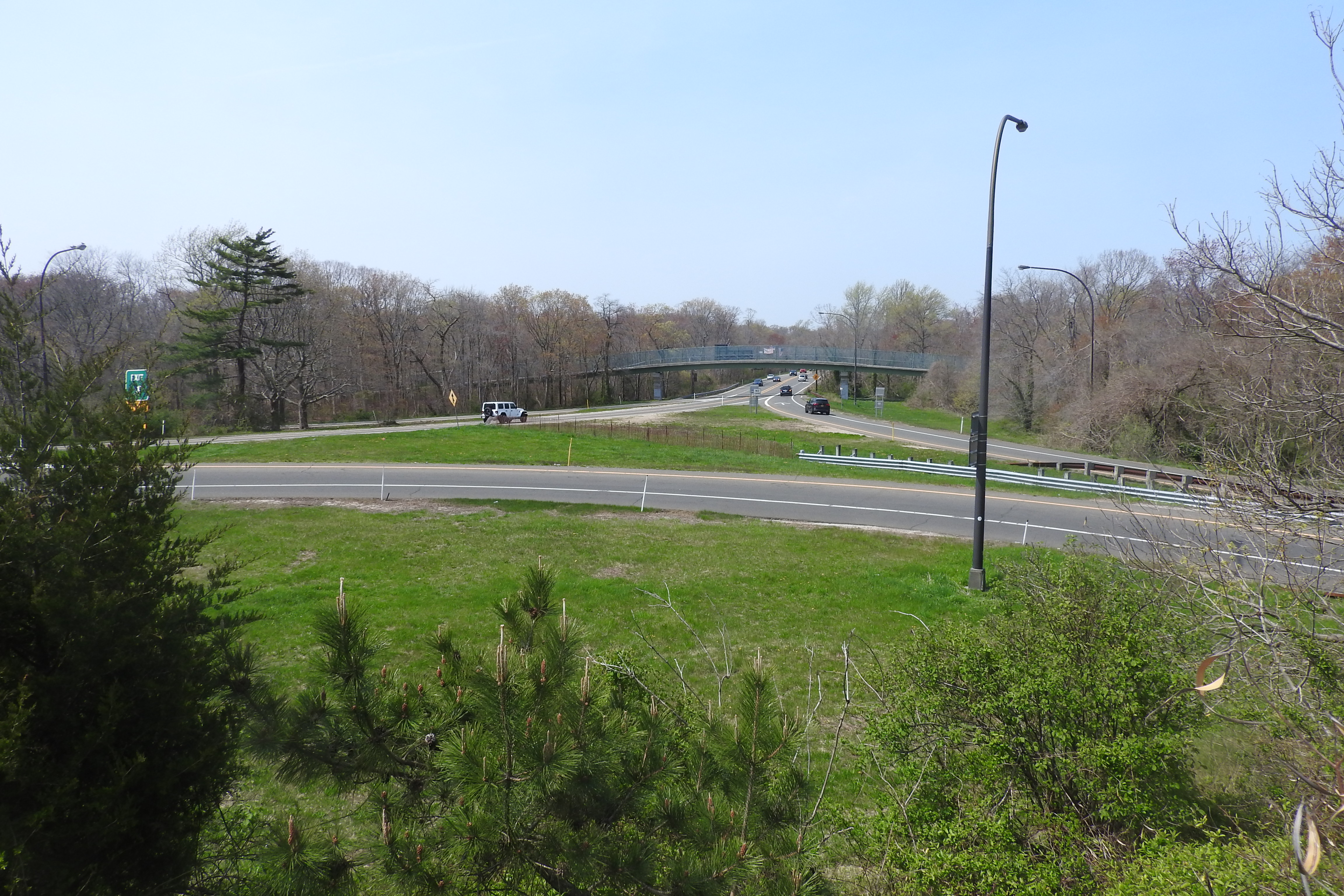
Trumpet interchange, south terminus of the road

The Bethpage State Parkway begins at Southern State Parkway exit 31, a trumpet interchange located within the Massapequa Preserve in the hamlet of North Massapequa. On the southbound Bethpage Parkway, the junction is signed as exit B1. From the Southern State Parkway, the Bethpage proceeds northward through North Massapequa and the town of Oyster Bay as a two-lane freeway, traversing the northwesternmost part of the Massapequa Preserve. The forests of the preserve serve as a buffer between the highway and the dense neighborhoods of North Massapequa, and this setup follows the parkway to exit B2, a northbound-only exit for Boundary Avenue. Heading northbound, the 500-foot (150 m) stretch prior to the exit gore is two lanes wide.

After passing under Boundary Avenue, the Bethpage Parkway bends to the northwest, leaving the Massapequa Preserve but continuing to run across a wooded strip of land in an otherwise heavily developed area. The highway passes through South Farmingdale on its way into the Farmingdale section of Oyster Bay, where it briefly widens to four lanes and begins to curve northward ahead of exit B3, a partial cloverleaf interchange with NY 24 (Hempstead Turnpike). The southbound cloverleaf ramps connect directly to NY 24, while the northbound ramps use a short section of Beach Street to reach the state route. Continuing northward, the Bethpage State Parkway passes under the Main Line of the Long Island Rail Road tracks and enters Bethpage, where the highway meets Central Avenue at exit B4 just north of the tracks.

While Central Avenue heads west to Bethpage's commercial center, the parkway bends northeastward into Bethpage State Park and connects to Plainview Road and a local park road by way of a traffic circle. The Bethpage State Parkway ends here while Plainview Road connects to the nearby Seaford–Oyster Bay Expressway (NY 135) and the Bethpage State Golf Course. The entire parkway corridor is served by a bike path that runs along the east side of the Bethpage Parkway, and the path continues northwest from the circle along the east side of Plainview Road. The Bethpage Parkway was ceremoniously designated February 27, 1997 as the Philip B. Healey Memorial Parkway for Philip B. Healey, a State Assemblyman from Massapequa who died in May 1996. Healey had served the Massapequa area in the Assembly since 1971.

== History ==
=== Design and construction ===
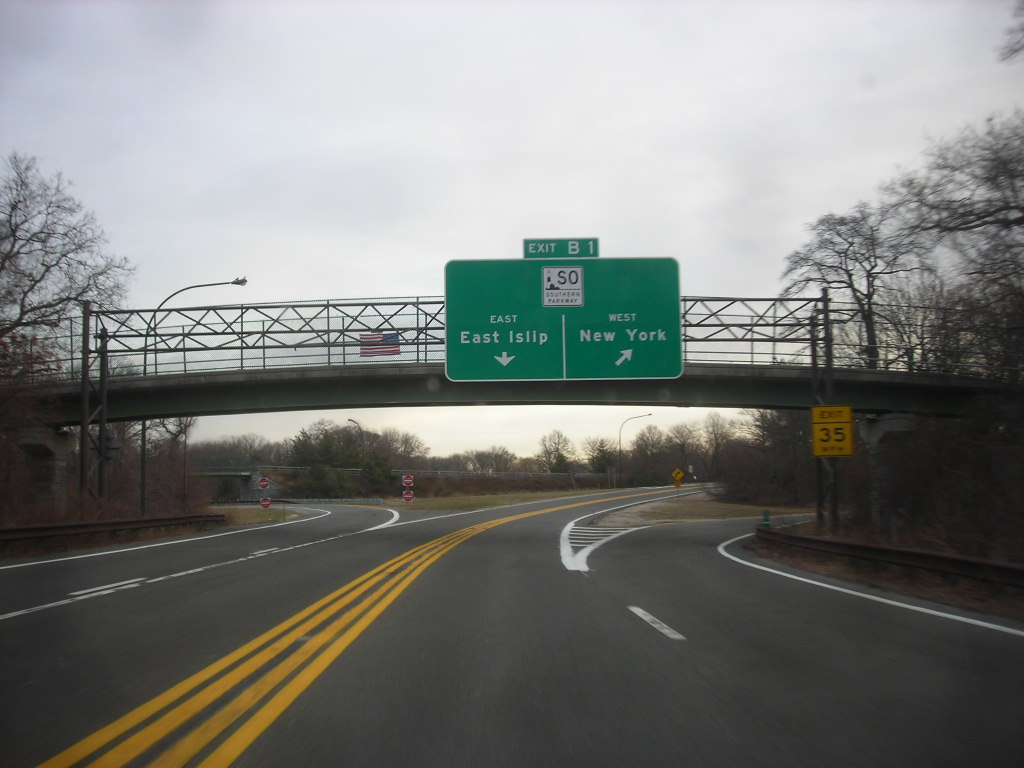
The Bethpage State Parkway southbound approaching exit B1, the Southern State Parkway in North Massapequa

The Bethpage State Parkway was developed as part of a plan proposed by Robert Moses in 1924 that would help people travel in private automobiles from New York City to state parks proposed by the Long Island State Park Commission (LISPC). Moses, president of the LISPC, saw this as a personal mission, having owned a residence in Babylon. While the LISPC was formed to get more state parks, Moses was more focused on building roadways to get to them. Development throughout Nassau County had become common: with a 441% increase in population from 1900 to 1930, it was becoming more urgent to secure open land for parks. The agency was given the right to condemn land for these parks, which led to conflict with locals and other agencies who felt it isolated them from getting money in the development craze. Bethpage State Park was created from land originally owned by Benjamin Yoakum, a railroad executive. In 1923, Yoakum opened a golf course on the land with 18 holes and a country club. Eight years later, in 1931, the LISPC leased the property from Yoakum. It was made into public land a year later, at which point the property was renamed the Bethpage Golf Club. On May 24, 1934, the land which had become Bethpage State Park was sold to the LISPC.

In similarity to parkways designed to access Jones Beach State Park, Moses designed the Bethpage State Parkway as a road that would have a rustic environment. This would include the use of wooden light posts instead of steel, wooden guide rails, and concrete overpasses designed with a stone face. Along with these designs, Moses also confirmed that the parkways would remain free of commercial vehicles and truck traffic. The parkway was designed with a line of woodlands alongside both 22-foot (6.7 m) lanes. Construction began on the parkway in 1934 even though a date of completion for the rest of the Long Island parkway system—which the Bethpage was intended to connect to—had yet to be established. On November 14, 1936, the recreational parkway was opened to traffic along with the Laurelton Parkway in Queens. Automobiles lined up at the Southern State Parkway in North Massapequa to travel the new parkway, which cost a total of $1.05 million (1936 USD). The ceremonial ribbon was cut at noon, after which Moses spoke praise to the federal government for its assistance and discussed how Bethpage State Park was previously inaccessible. The event was followed by a luncheon at the park.

=== Extensions ===
During the opening, Moses was already proposing plans to extend the Bethpage southward to NY 27 and Merrick Road in Massapequa. The right-of-way for this new parkway was to cross Massapequa State Park, and as a result, Moses saw no trouble in acquiring the right-of-way. Moses proposed building interchanges at Merrick Road, which would have been a trumpet interchange, and NY 27, which would have been a full cloverleaf. The interchange with the Southern State Parkway would have been upgraded to a full cloverleaf. The design of the extension would be different than that of the original Bethpage Parkway, however, as the designs were refined in the 1950s to make the current parkway and extension a four-lane divided highway instead of the two-lane undivided design used in the 1930s.

In the 1970s, a new bike path was constructed alongside the entire length of the Bethpage State Parkway. The path also continued south to Merrick Road by way of the right-of-way formerly proposed for the Bethpage Parkway's southern extension.

On May 20, 1961, a new parkway was proposed by the LISPC to connect the Northern State Parkway to the proposed Caumsett State Park, the site of a wildlife refuge and arboretum. To be known as the Caumsett State Parkway, it would have used filled land to traverse Cold Spring Harbor and have a southern terminus at the Bethpage Parkway's unbuilt northern terminus, at the Northern State Parkway. Conservationists of the Caumsett estate worried that the plans were too vague; furthermore, they believed that Caumsett should not be turned into a major-use facility like that of Jones Beach State Park on the southern shore.

Extending the Bethpage Parkway northward was a requirement for building the Caumsett Parkway, and four new interchanges were proposed for the Bethpage State Parkway. The first, exit B5, would be at NY 135 (the Seaford–Oyster Bay Expressway). With this new interchange, the traffic circle with Plainview Road in Bethpage State Park would be eliminated. Other junctions included a diamond interchange for Plainview Avenue and Bethpage State Park, a full cloverleaf interchange with Old Country Road, and a partial cloverleaf interchange with the Long Island Expressway (then-NY 495). North of there, the Bethpage State Parkway would reach a full cloverleaf interchange with the Northern State Parkway, where it would terminate and continue north as the Caumsett State Parkway.

In 1990, the Long Island Regional Planning Board proposed a new parkway extension to NY 25A in Cold Spring Harbor as part of a 20-year highway improvement program. However, funding sources were not specified. As part of the Long Island Transportation Plan 2000, the New York State Department of Transportation proposed that the Bethpage be extended northwest to NY 135 in Bethpage. In 1987, however, the Long Island Greenbelt Trail Conference proposed that the right-of-way for the Caumsett become part of a new Greenbelt trail. In September 2002, Governor George Pataki announced the opening of Trail View State Park, a new, linear 400-acre (160 ha) state park using the former Bethpage and Caumsett rights-of-way. The park also included a 7.4-mile (11.9 km) trail.

The New York State Department of Transportation is currently constructing the Bethpage Bikeway, a multi-use trail extending 5.8 miles (9.3 km) northward from Bethpage State Park to the Syosset station on the Long Island Rail Road. Part of the path will use a former alignment of the Long Island Motor Parkway. The proposed bike trail will cost $6.49 million (2012 USD) and was expected to be completed on July 3, 2012. The contract is slated to expire on December 30, 2012.

The map on the right shows the built segment of the Bethpage State Parkway (black) and the unbuilt segments of the Bethpage Parkway and unbuilt Caumsett Parkway (red).

The Bethpage State Parkway's Unbuilt Northern Extension

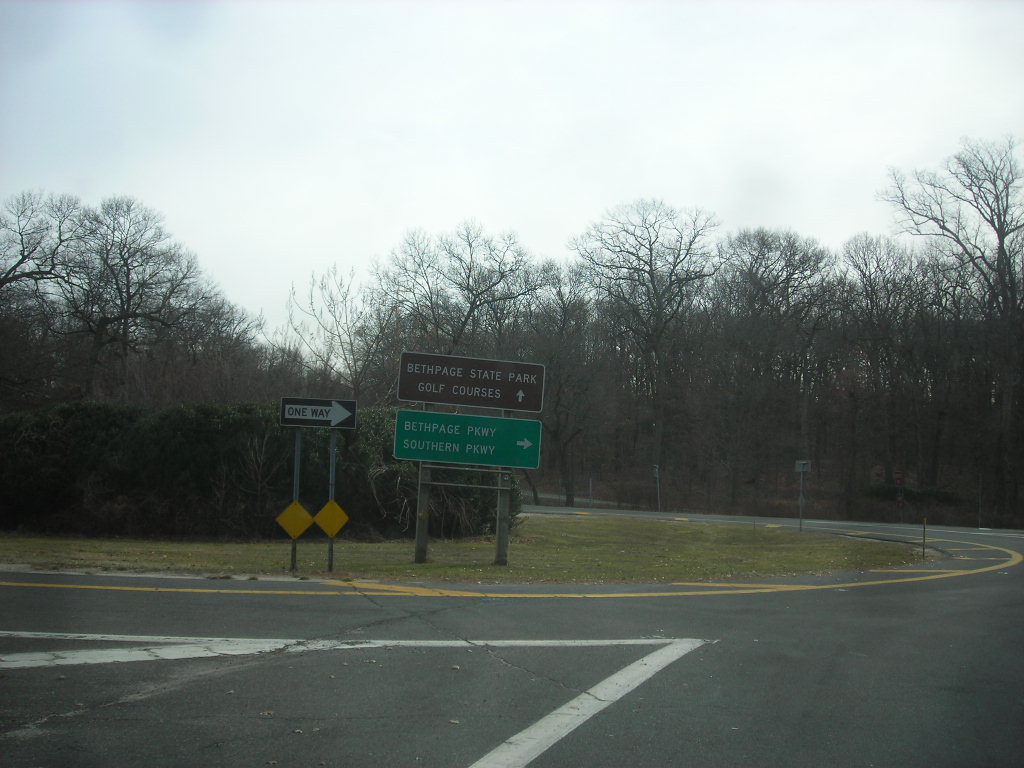
The Bethpage Parkway's current northern terminus at the traffic circle in Bethpage.

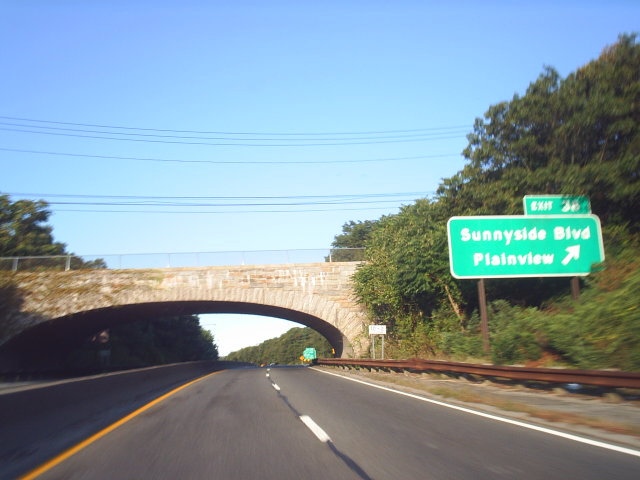
Exit 38 on the Northern State Parkway in Plainview, west of where the Bethpage and Caumsett Parkways were to meet.

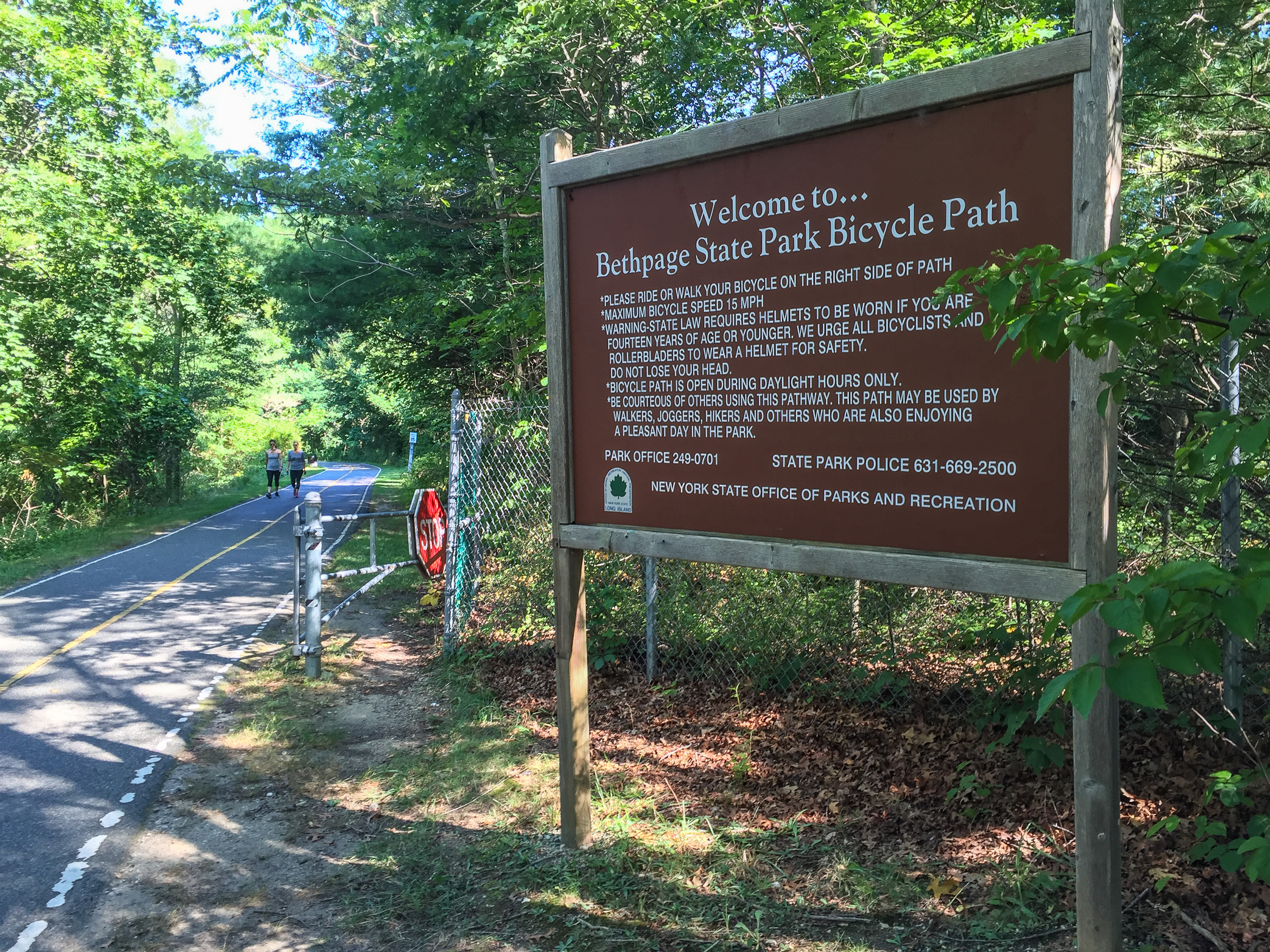
The Bethpage Bikeway is built along much of the unbuilt extension's route.

== Exit list ==
The entire route is in Nassau County.

Location	mi	km	Exit	Destinations	Notes
North Massapequa	0.00	0.00	–	Southern State Parkway east – East Islip	Southern terminus
North Massapequa			B1	Southern State Parkway west – New York	Southbound exit and northbound entrance; exit 31 on Southern State Parkway; additional entrance from Linden Street
North Massapequa–South Farmingdale line	0.91	1.46	B2	Boundary Avenue	Northbound exit only
Plainedge–South Farmingdale line	1.80	2.90	B3	NY 24 (Hempstead Turnpike) – Levittown, Farmingdale	
Bethpage	2.38	3.83	B4	Central Avenue – Farmingdale, Bethpage	
Bethpage State Park	2.49	4.01	–	Plainview Road to I-495 / NY 135 – Bethpage State Park	Roundabout; northern terminus
1.000 mi = 1.609 km; 1.000 km = 0.621 mi: Incomplete access

=== Extension to Plainview ===
If ever built, the Bethpage State Parkway extension to the Caumsett and Northern State Parkways would have the following interchanges, beginning at the existing northern terminus of the Bethpage Parkway:

Location	mi	km	Exit	Destinations	Notes
Bethpage			–	Bethpage State Parkway south	Continuation south
Bethpage			B5	NY 135 (Seaford–Oyster Bay Expressway)	Same-directional access only
Bethpage			B6	Plainview Road / Broadway – Bethpage State Park	
Plainview			B7	Old Country Road	
Plainview			B8	I-495 (Long Island Expressway)	Proposed exit 47 on I-495
Plainview			B9	Northern State Parkway	
Plainview			–	Caumsett State Parkway north	Continuation north
1.000 mi = 1.609 km; 1.000 km = 0.621 mi: Incomplete access
