= Bethpage State Park =

State park in the U.S. state of New York

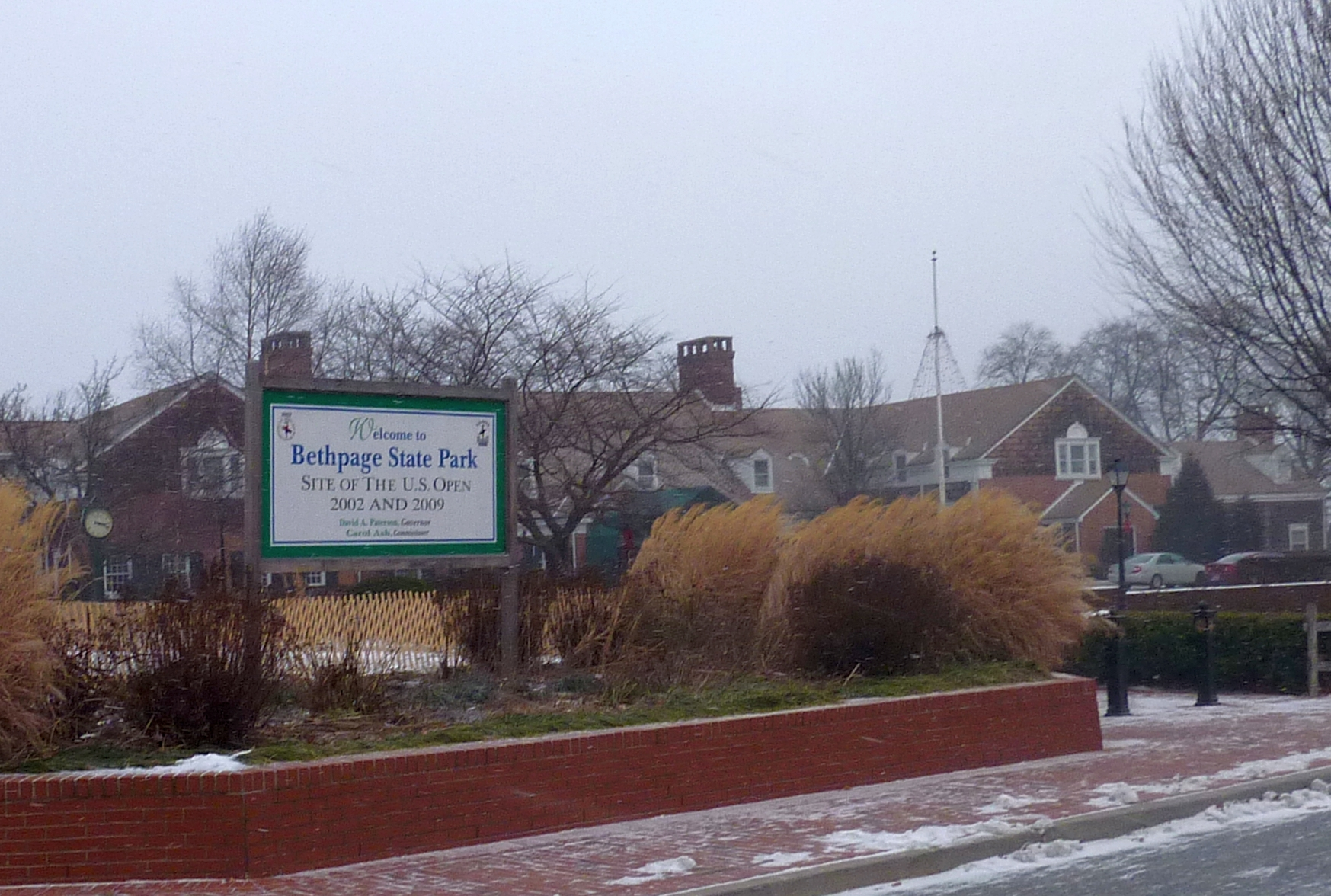
- Clubhouse at Bethpage State Park

- Location within New York
- Type: State park
- Location: Old Bethpage, New York
- Coordinates: 40°45′09″N 73°28′03″W
- Area: 1,477 acres (598 ha)
- Created: May 1934
- Designer: Devereux Emmet (Green course); A. W. Tillinghast (Blue, Red and Black courses); Alfred Tull (Yellow course)
- Operator: New York State Department of Parks, Recreation and Historic Preservation
- Visitors: 647,118 (in 2020)
- Open: All year
- Website: Bethpage State Park

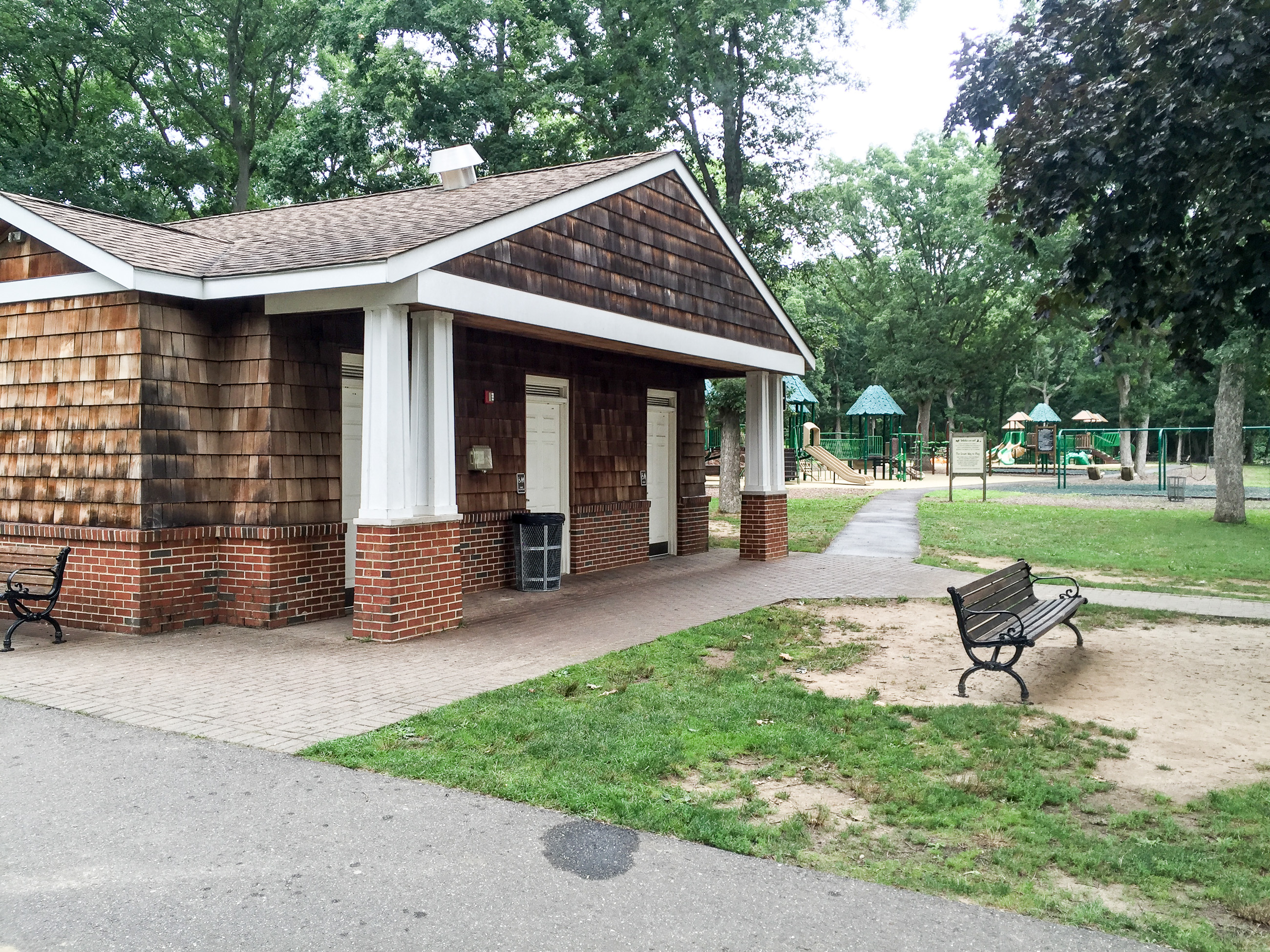
Bethpage State Park restrooms and playground area

Bethpage State Park is a 1,477-acre (5.98 km^{2}) New York state park on the border of Nassau County and Suffolk County on Long Island. The park contains tennis courts, picnic and recreational areas and a polo field, but is best known for its five golf courses, including the Bethpage Black Course, which hosted the 2002 and 2009 U.S. Open Golf Championships, the 2019 PGA Championship and the 2025 Ryder Cup.

== History ==
In 1912, Benjamin Franklin Yoakum, a wealthy railroad executive, acquired 1,368 acres (5.5 km^{2}) of land in what is now known as Old Bethpage, NY, a hamlet adjacent to the Village of Farmingdale. Yoakum hired Devereux Emmet to design and build an 18-hole golf course on the land, which opened for play in 1923, and which Yoakum leased to the private Lenox Hills Country Club. At this time part of Youkum's estate was subdivided for residential use. This is the Old Lenox Hills neighborhood of Farmingdale Village.

When Yoakum died in 1929, there was conflict over usage of the leased lands. The State of New York, under the auspices of the Long Island State Park Commission, expressed interest in obtaining the lands, and purchased an option on the property in 1931. New York was able to assume management of the Lenox Hills Country Club through a lease agreement with the private owners in 1932, however Bethpage State Park was not officially purchased by the state until May 1934. Jesse Merritt of Farmingdale, Nassau County Historian, had convinced Robert Moses to name the park "Bethpage State Park" after the 15-square-mile (39 km^{2}) tract of land purchased by his ancestor Thomas Powell in 1695 from three Native American tribes.

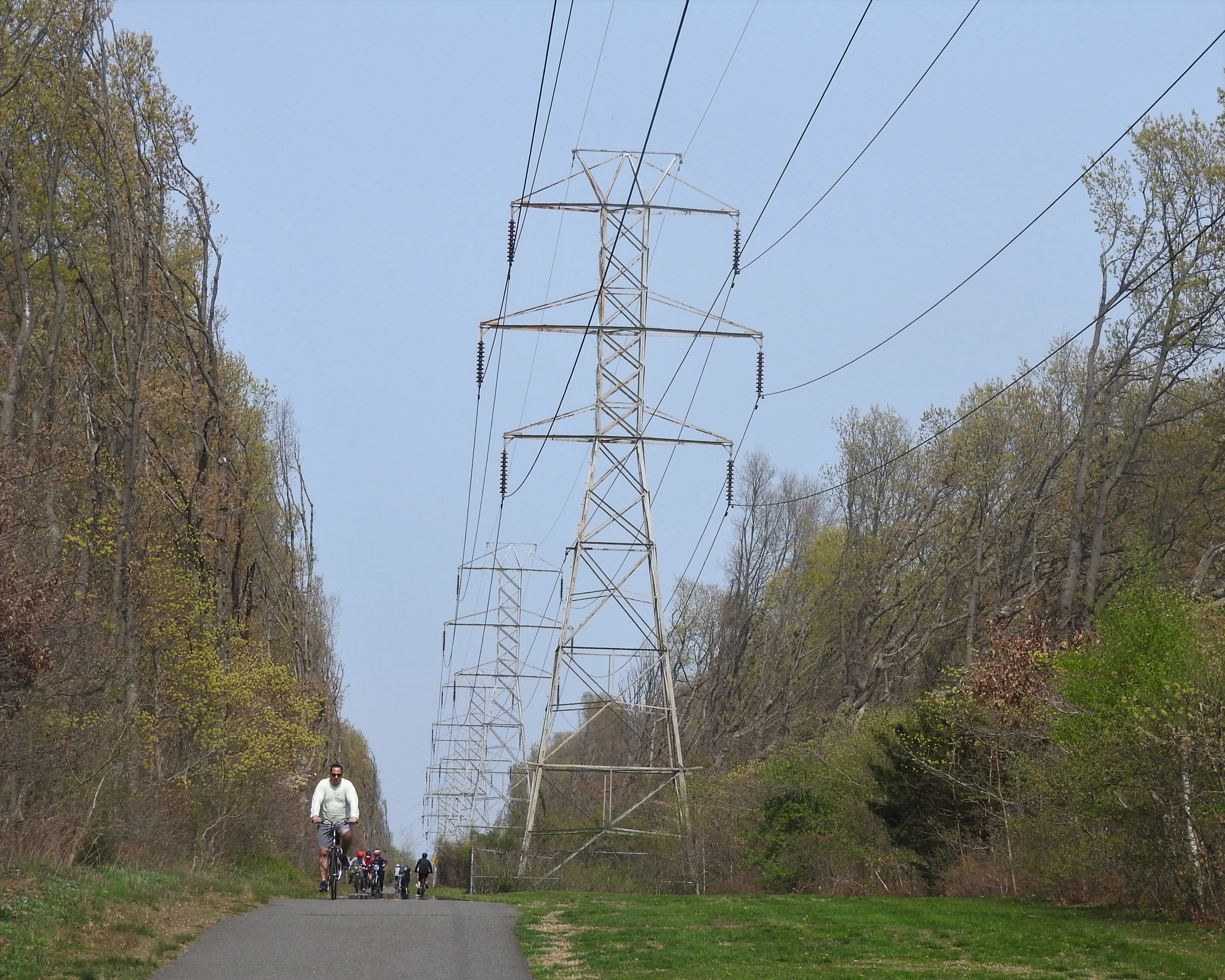
Bike trail and power line

The original golf course became the Green Course; by 1936, three more courses opened, designed by A. W. Tillinghast under contract to the Park Commission; a fifth (the Yellow Course) was designed by Alfred Tull (formerly a business partner of Emmet), and opened in 1958. The park has picnic facilities, bridle paths, playing fields, a polo field, tennis courts, cross-country skiing trails, and hiking and biking trails including one leading south to Massapequa, but it is best known for its golf facilities.

Bethpage State Park also has a four kilometer and five kilometer cross country course.

== Geography ==
The park is not located in Bethpage as its name suggests, but actually located almost entirely within the hamlet of Old Bethpage. However, since at the time there was no Old Bethpage post office, it used a Farmingdale address instead, and continues to use one to this day. The clubhouse is located next to Lenox Hills and is within the Farmingdale School District. The Green course is adjacent to the Lenox Hills area, while the Yellow Course is adjacent to the part of Lenox Hills within Farmingdale Village and the part of Lenox Hills, unincorporated Farmingdale, just west of it along Merritts Road toward Bethpage. The Black Course is adjacent to the exclusive Melville Court development in East Farmingdale and the Old Bethpage industrial area. The Red Course is adjacent to Old Bethpage residential neighborhoods, while the Blue Course is closer to the community of Bethpage (formerly Central Park, pre-1936).

Bethpage State Park's name reflects the locality names that existed at the time of its creation. Old Bethpage was known as Bethpage prior to 1936, when the adjacent hamlet of Central Park changed its name to Bethpage. Following this name change, the hamlet originally called Bethpage resisted suggestions that it merge with the new Bethpage, and got approval from the post office to change its name to Old Bethpage, though it did not have its own post office until 1965. The parcel of the Quaker Bethpage Friends Meeting House, across from the Park entrance, is within Old Bethpage hamlet boundaries, but abuts residences within the Lenox Hills area of Farmingdale Village. These specific border circumstances clarify that the park has close ties to Farmingdale.

== Golf ==
Bethpage Black Course
- Interactive map of Bethpage Black Course

Club information
- Location: Old Bethpage, New York
- Established: 1936
- Type: Public
- Operator: New York State Office of Parks, Recreation and Historic Preservation
- Total holes: 18
- Tournaments: U.S. Open (2 Times)
- Designed by: A. W. Tillinghast
- Par: 70 (2009 U.S. Open)
- Length: 7,426 yards (6,790 m) (2009 U.S. Open)
- Slope rating: 140

The park has five eighteen-hole golf courses, named (in increasing order of difficulty) the Yellow, Green, Blue, Red, and Black Courses. In 2002 the Black Course became the first publicly owned and operated course to host the U.S. Open. The tournament was won by Tiger Woods, being the only golfer to score under par for the tournament. The Tournament was seen as one of the most difficult and exciting U.S. Opens in history, breaking attendance records and creating a boisterous atmosphere for the U.S. Open. Bethpage Black also hosted the 2009 U.S. Open, which was won by Lucas Glover.

Prior to 2002, all U.S. Opens had been staged at private golf or country clubs or at privately owned resorts that, while open to the public, were very expensive for the public to play, with greens fees of several hundred dollars per round. The USGA's choice of Bethpage was seen as an egalitarian move; as of 2010, Bethpage Black's weekend price for 18 holes was $75 for New York State residents, and $150 for non-residents. There are a number of ways for golfers to secure a round on the always popular Black Course. To register for a tee time, guests must have their driver's license on file with the park's reservation system. Note that New York residents can reserve a tee time seven days in advance, while out-of-state residents can only reserve tee times starting at 7:00 pm Eastern Time five days before the intended date of play. Walk-ups are also accepted. Commonly, golfers wait in line in the parking lot overnight to secure walk-up tee times.

The logo for the entire golf complex is a profile of a boy caddie carrying a golf bag with two golf clubs sticking up from it. It is based on the images carved into the black exterior window shutters on its clubhouse.

=== Rankings ===
In its July 2008 list of America's greatest golf courses, Golf Digest ranked Bethpage Black #26 overall, #6 in the state of New York, #6 of America's 50 toughest courses, and #5 in its list of America's greatest public golf courses. It is also the top-ranked course in the Golf Digest list that is operated by a governmental entity. The PGA lists Bethpage Black as one of the "World's Most Beautiful Courses".

=== Notable events hosted ===
Year	Date	Tournament	Winner	Score	To par	Margin of victory	Runner(s)-up	Classification
2025	Sep 28	Ryder Cup	Europe	28 matches		15 to 13	United States	International competition
2019	May 19	PGA Championship	(United States) Brooks Koepka	272	−8	2 strokes	(United States) Dustin Johnson	Major championship
2016	Aug 28	The Barclays*	(United States) Patrick Reed	275	−9	1 stroke	(Argentina) Emiliano Grillo (United States) Sean O'Hair	FedEx Cup playoffs
2012	Aug 26	The Barclays*	(United States) Nick Watney	274	−10	3 strokes	(United States) Brandt Snedeker	FedEx Cup playoffs
2009	Jun 22	U.S. Open	(United States) Lucas Glover	276	−4	2 strokes	(United States) Ricky Barnes (United States) David Duval (United States) Phil Mickelson	Major championship
2002	Jun 16	U.S. Open	(United States) Tiger Woods	277	−3	3 strokes	(United States) Phil Mickelson	Major championship

* The Barclays is now known as the FedEx St. Jude Championship.

=== Future events ===
Year	Event	Type	Times hosted
2028	Women's PGA Championship	Women's major	Inaugural
2033	PGA Championship	Men's major	2019

== Polo ==
The Polo Grounds at Bethpage State Park offers a 900-by-400-foot (270 by 120 m) field with bleacher seating. The field was built in 1934 and has seen both high and medium goal polo. "Polo at the Park" is hosted by Country Farms Polo Club every Sunday from June through September. The 1994 U.S. Open Polo Championship was hosted by the Meadowbrook Polo Club and the finals were played at Bethpage State Park.

== See also ==
- List of New York state parks
