= Laughing Boy =

Laughing Boy may refer to:

- Laughing Boy (painting), a 1625 painting by Frans Hals
- Laughing Boy (novel), a 1929 novel by Oliver La Farge
- Laughing Boy (film), a 1934 film adaptation of the novel
- "Laughing Boy" (song), a 1963 song by Mary Wells
- "Laughing Boy", a 1986 song by Died Pretty from the 1986 album Free Dirt
