= Wurtzel =

Wurtzel is a surname. Notable people with the surname include:

- Adam Wurtzel (born 1985), American television personality
- Elizabeth Wurtzel (1967–2020), American writer and journalist
- Sol M. Wurtzel (1890–1958), American motion picture producer
- Stuart Wurtzel (born 1940), American art director

== See also ==
- Wurzel (disambiguation)
