= Kate Murray (New York politician) =

American politician (born 1962)

Town Clerk of Hempstead
- Incumbent
- Assumed office January 2020
- Preceded by: Sylvia A. Cabana

Town Supervisor of Hempstead
- In office 2003–2015
- Preceded by: Richard V. Guardino, Jr.
- Succeeded by: Anthony J. Santino

Member of the New York State Assembly from the 19th district
- In office 1998–2001
- Preceded by: Charles O'Shea
- Succeeded by: David McDonough

Personal details
- Born: October 9, 1962 (age 64) Levittown, New York, United States
- Party: Republican
- Education: Boston College; Suffolk University Law School
- Profession: lawyer, politician

Kate Murray (born October 9, 1962) is an American politician and attorney, and the former Supervisor of the Town of Hempstead, New York, United States.

== Education and early career ==
Murray, a resident of Levittown, Murray attended Levittown Memorial High School, which inducted her into its inaugural Hall of Fame class in 2017. She graduated from Boston College and Suffolk University Law School. Murray served as advocate for Suffolk University Battered Women's Advocacy Project where she represented the victims of domestic violence. She has worked as an Assistant Attorney General in the Criminal Justice Section handling prisoner litigation.

== Political career ==
A Republican, Murray became the first woman and first Levittowner elected to the New York State Assembly from the 19th Assembly District on February 3, 1998. She represented the district until 2001.

Murray then served as Clerk for the Town of Hempstead. She was appointed Supervisor by the Hempstead Town Board in 2003, after being tapped by Nassau County Republican Chairman Joseph Mondello when Supervisor Richard V. Guardino Jr. resigned. She won election to the position of Supervisor in the fall of 2003 and was re-elected in 2005 with over 60% of the vote. She is a close ally of Mondello, who also held the post of Republican Party State Chairman during the 2000s. Although the county GOP organization's strength has declined precipitously from what it had been in past decades—as demonstrated by its loss of control in the neighboring Town of North Hempstead, under Democratic administration from 1989 onward, as well as the county government itself between 2002 and 2009—the Town of Hempstead remains a GOP stronghold. Her governance was marked by a three-step downgrade of Hempstead's credit rating in Murray's final year as supervisor by Standard & Poor's, which cited the drawing down of reserves and the settlement in a complex tuition payment for the Fashion Institute of Technology. That followed a downgrade a year earlier by S&P, which means Murray's governance led to four downgrades in her final two years on the job.

In May 2015, Murray announced her candidacy for Nassau County District Attorney. She lost to Madeline Singas.

Kate Murray is credited with losing the election due to the failure of The Lighthouse Project, which she opposed and downsized, and which would have created a large new development at the site of the Nassau Coliseum that also would have served as a newly renovated home for the New York Islanders.

After leaving her town office and following her defeat for the DA's position, she took a job with Nassau County Community College.

In early 2019, Murray announced that she was going to attempt a return to public office by running for Town Clerk. She also apparently believes that Islander fans have gotten past her role in the collapse of the Lighthouse project and that this will not be a factor in her electability going forward. She defeated incumbent Town Clerk Sylvia Cabana, 73,703 to 70,317.

In 2026, Murray ran for re-election as Town Clerk and lost to democrat Joylette E. Williams.

New York State Assembly
Preceded by Charles O'Shea	New York State Assembly, 19th District; 1998–2001	Succeeded by David McDonough
Political offices
Preceded by Richard V. Guardino, Jr.	Town Supervisor of Hempstead, NY; 2003–2015	Succeeded by Anthony J. Santino
