= New York's 14th State Assembly district =

American legislative district

Assemblymember
David McDonough; R–Merrick

New York's 14th State Assembly district is one of the 150 districts in the New York State Assembly. It has been represented by Republican David McDonough since a special election in 2002. In 2026, he announced that he would not seek re-election.

== Geography ==
=== 2020s ===
District 14 is located entirely within Nassau County. It includes portions of the town of Hempstead, including Bellmore, North Bellmore, Wantagh, Merrick, and portions of Levittown and Oceanside. A portion of Jones Beach is within this district.

The district overlaps New York's 3rd and 4th congressional districts, and overlaps the 5th and 6th districts of the New York State Senate.

=== 2010s ===
District 14 is located entirely within Nassau County. It includes portions of the town of Hempstead, including Bellmore, North Bellmore, Wantagh and Merrick. A portion of Jones Beach is within this district.

== Recent election results ==
=== 2026 ===
2026 New York State Assembly election, District 14
Party	Candidate	Votes	%
Republican	Shannon Fredericks		
Conservative	Shannon Fredericks		
Total	Shannon Fredericks		
Democratic	John Brooks		
Write-in			
Total votes			

=== 2024 ===
2024 New York State Assembly election, District 14
Party	Candidate	Votes	%
Republican	David McDonough	45,911	
Conservative	David McDonough	3,728	
Total	David McDonough (incumbent)	49,639	63.9
Democratic	Ellen DeFrancesco	27,906	36.0
Write-in		55	0.1
Total votes		77,600	100.0
Republican hold			

=== 2022 ===
2022 New York State Assembly election, District 14
Party	Candidate	Votes	%
Republican	David McDonough	37,023	
Conservative	David McDonough	3,342	
Total	David McDonough (incumbent)	40,365	65.0
Democratic	Dustin Ginsberg	21,718	35.0
Write-in		13	0.0
Total votes		62,096	100.0
Republican hold			

=== 2020 ===
2020 New York State Assembly election, District 14
Party	Candidate	Votes	%
Republican	David McDonough	39,049	
Conservative	David McDonough	3,517	
Independence	David McDonough	824	
Total	David McDonough (incumbent)	43,390	59.3
Democratic	Kevin Gorman	29,129	39.8
Libertarian	Jake Gutowitz	625	0.9
Write-in		22	0.0
Total votes		73,166	100.0
Republican hold			

=== 2018 ===
2018 New York State Assembly election, District 14
Party	Candidate	Votes	%
Republican	David McDonough	27,287	
Conservative	David McDonough	2,722	
Independence	David McDonough	452	
Tax Revolt Party	David McDonough	136	
Reform	David McDonough	76	
Total	David McDonough (incumbent)	30,673	56.0
Democratic	Michael Reid	23,210	
Working Families	Michael Reid	531	
Women's Equality	Michael Reid	326	
Total	Michael Reid	24,067	44.0
Write-in		25	0.0
Total votes		54,765	100.0
Republican hold			

=== 2016 ===
2016 New York State Assembly election, District 14
Party	Candidate	Votes	%
Republican	David McDonough	35,113	
Conservative	David McDonough	3,672	
Independence	David McDonough	849	
Tax Revolt Party	David McDonough	282	
Reform	David McDonough	135	
Total	David McDonough (incumbent)	40,051	62.9
Democratic	Michael Reid	22,270	
Working Families	Michael Reid	920	
Women's Equality	Michael Reid	415	
Total	Michael Reid	23,605	37.1
Write-in		33	0.0
Total votes		63,689	100.0
Republican hold			

=== 2014 ===
2014 New York State Assembly election, District 14
Party	Candidate	Votes	%
Republican	David McDonough	19,727	
Conservative	David McDonough	2,772	
Independence	David McDonough	935	
Tax Revolt Party	David McDonough	182	
Total	David McDonough (incumbent)	23,616	68.8
Democratic	Gasparre Tumminello	9,798	
Working Families	Gasparre Tumminello	902	
Total	Gasparre Tumminello	10,700	31.2
Write-in		16	0.0
Total votes		34,332	100.0
Republican hold			

=== 2012 ===
2012 New York State Assembly election, District 14
Party	Candidate	Votes	%
Republican	David McDonough	27,907	
Conservative	David McDonough	3,488	
Independence	David McDonough	1,134	
Tax Revolt Party	David McDonough	236	
Total	David McDonough (incumbent)	32,765	63.0
Democratic	John Brooks	18,094	
Working Families	John Brooks	1,149	
Total	John Brooks	19,243	37.0
Write-in		13	0.0
Total votes		52,021	100.0
Republican hold			
