= Forest City Community Park =

Park in Nassau County, New York, United States

- Interactive map of Forest City Community Park
- Type: Public
- Location: Forest City, North Wantagh, New York
- Coordinates: 40°41′44″N 73°31′17″W
- Area: 21 acres (8.5 ha)
- Established: 1950 (as a private park); 1981 (as a town park)
- Owner: Town of Hempstead
- Operator: Town of Hempstead Department of Parks and Recreation
- Website: Forest City Community Park – Town of Hempstead

Forest City Community Park (also known as Forest City Park) is a public, 21-acre (8.5 ha) park located within North Wantagh in the Town of Hempstead, in Nassau County, New York, United States.

The park is owned and operated by the Town of Hempstead.

== Overview ==
Forest City Community Park is located on 21 acres (8.5 ha) of land, bordered to the west by the Forest City housing development, to the north by the Southern State Parkway, and to the east by the Wantagh State Parkway. It consists of an outdoor swimming pool complex, playgrounds, picnic areas, a clubhouse, woodlands, trails, ballfields, and other sporting facilities; a 10-acre (4.0 ha) lake – the Wantagh Reservoir – is also located within the park, along Bellmore Creek.

== History ==
What is now Forest City Community Park was originally part of a hunting lodge owned by Odgen Phipps and a farm, prior to the area's development into the Forest City housing development, built by Bernard Krinsky of Housing Associates.

The park was originally opened in 1950 as a private neighborhood park in – and the centerpiece of – the 1,185-home Forest City housing development which it sits in and that was being built at the same time. Designed by landscape architect Leo A. Novick and consulting engineer Ralph Eberlin, the park was constructed, owned, and operated by the Forest City Community Association – the Forest City development's local homeowner's association. The park's clubhouse originally also served as the civic association's headquarters.

In 1954, a two-year-old child drowned in the lake in the park.

In 1955, a new youth center building opened in the park, designed by John O'Keefe and replacing an old chicken coop and stable from the farm that stood on the site prior to redevelopment into Forest City; it was constructed at a cost of less than $9,000 (1955 USD) and enabled the commencement of little league games at the park. The new structure incorporated materials from the original stable and chicken house into the design.

In 1959, an Olympic-size swimming pool was added by the association, for the exclusive use of members of Forest City's homeowner's association.

In December 1980, the Town of Hempstead purchased the property for $1, to maintain it as a public, town-run park, at the request of residents and the civic association; the locals and the association wished for the park to continue operating, but could not afford to continue maintaining it themselves without raising membership fees more than they already had – a situation made more difficult in light of a string of vandalism at the facilities by local youth; membership fees had, by then, reached $235 per year for the average family in the development. As a result, the Forest City residents and their civic association dedicated the park to the Town of Hempstead for $1 in consideration.

Upon taking ownership of the park, the town installed upgraded pool filtration systems, modernized the complex, and added new facilities – including the a maintenance building, new bathrooms, an upgraded and deepened swimming pool, and a new concession stand, among other new and renovated amenities; the $4.1 million rehabilitation project was approved by the Town of Hempstead in a vote on June 23, 1981.

== See also ==
- Christopher Morley Park
- Wantagh Park
