= Jerusalem District No. 5 Schoolhouse =

- U.S. National Register of Historic Places
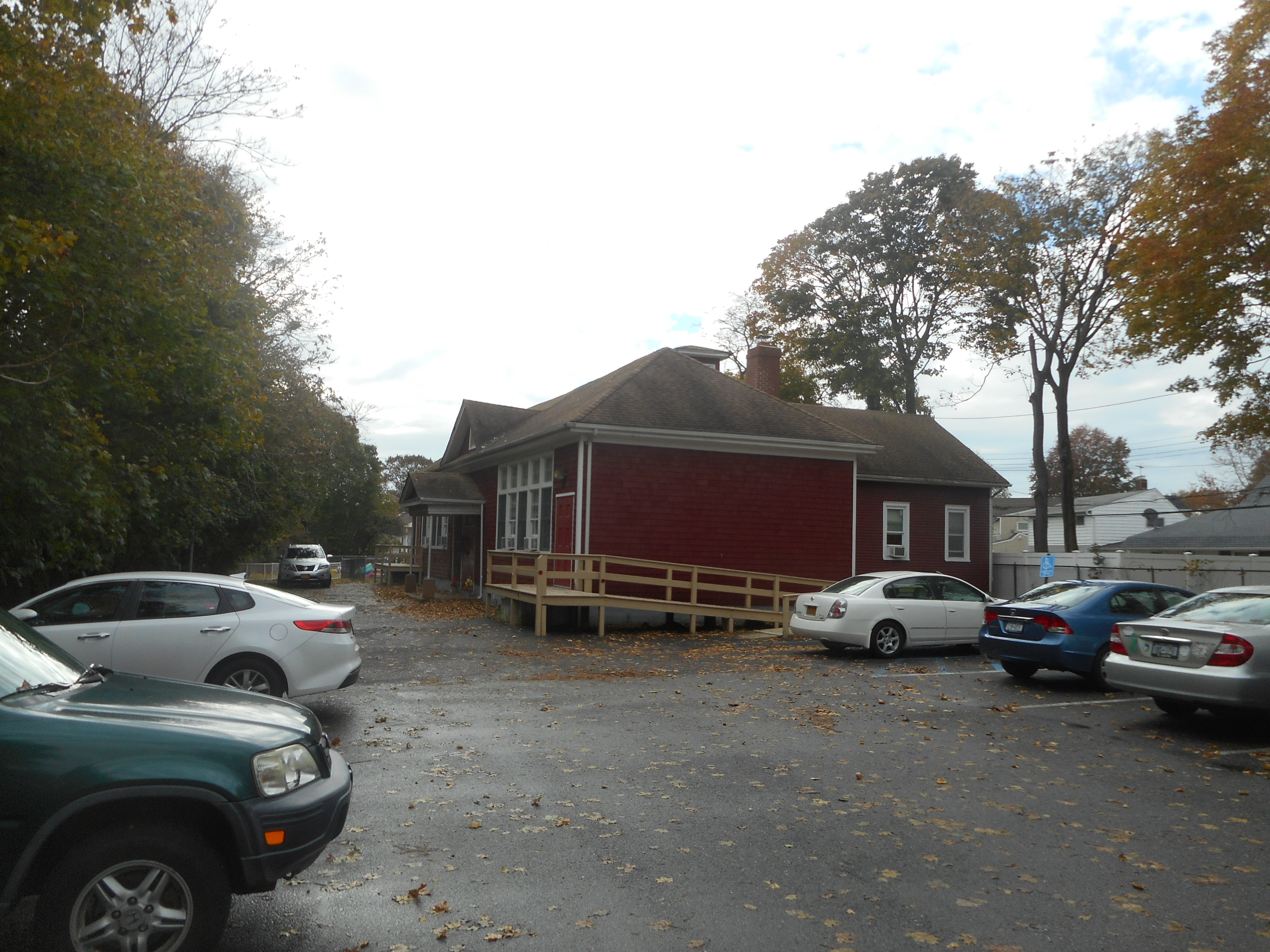
- The former one-room schoolhouse, now a local pre-school

- Location within New York Location within the United States
- Location: 3510 Old Jerusalem Road, Wantagh, New York 11793
- Coordinates: 40°42′08″N 73°30′26″W
- Area: 1 acre (0.40 ha)
- Built: 1876
- NRHP reference No.: 96000204
- Added to NRHP: March 1, 1996

Jerusalem District No. 5 Schoolhouse is a historic one-room school building located at 3510 Old Jerusalem Rd in Wantagh, in Nassau County, New York, United States. It is owned by Levittown Union Free School District (U.F.S.D. #5).

== Description ==
The schoolhouse was built in 1876 and enlarged to three rooms about 1920. It is a T-shaped building with the original section located at the rear. It is a long frame building on a poured concrete foundation and hipped roof with shallow overhanging eaves. The main entrance features a portico. It is now leased out to a private day care facility.

It was listed on the National Register of Historic Places in 1996, and is also listed as a Town of Hempstead Historic Site.
