= North Wantagh, New York =

- Hamlet and Census-designated place
- Location in Nassau County and the state of New York

- Location on Long Island Location within the state of New York
- Coordinates: 40°41′52″N 73°30′21″W
- Country: United States
- State: New York
- County: Nassau
- Town: Hempstead

Area
  - Total: 1.91 sq mi (4.95 km^{2})
  - Land: 1.90 sq mi (4.93 km^{2})
  - Water: 0.0077 sq mi (0.02 km^{2})
- Elevation: 33 ft (10 m)

Population (2020)
  - Total: 11,931
  - Density: 6,268.6/sq mi (2,420.31/km^{2})
- Time zone: UTC-5 (Eastern (EST))
  - Summer (DST): UTC-4 (EDT)
- ZIP Codes: 11783 (Seaford); 11793 (Wantagh)
- Area codes: 516, 363
- FIPS code: 36-53792
- GNIS feature ID: 0958941
- Website: www.wantagh.li

North Wantagh is a hamlet and census-designated place in the Town of Hempstead in Nassau County, on the South Shore of Long Island, in New York, United States. The population was 11,931 at the time of the 2020 census.

== Geography ==
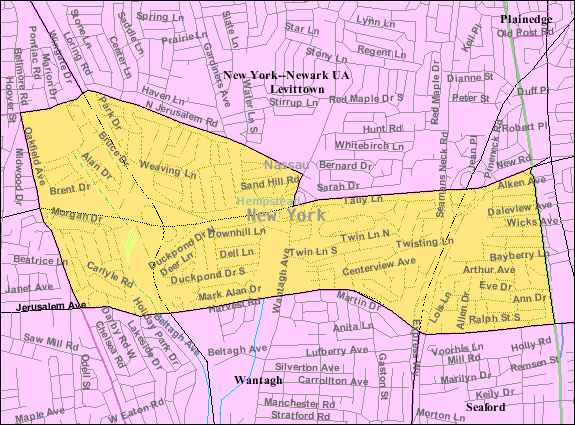
U.S. Census map of North Wantagh

According to the United States Census Bureau, the CDP has a total area of 1.9 square miles (4.9 km^{2}), of which 1.8 square miles (4.7 km^{2}) is land and 0.54% is water.

Since North Wantagh does not have a post office of its own, all places in the hamlet have either a "Wantagh, NY 11793" or "Seaford, NY 11783" mailing address. Non-conforming postal codes lead to a general misconception of the actual boundaries of this, and surrounding, areas. Parts of North Wantagh are more commonly referred to as simply "Wantagh" or "Seaford," while school service is provided by Levittown.

== Demographics ==
Historical population
| Census | Pop. | Note | %± |
|---|---|---|---|
| 2000 | 12,156 | | — |
| 2010 | 11,960 | | −1.6% |
| 2020 | 11,931 | | −0.2% |
U.S. Decennial Census

=== Racial and ethnic composition ===
North Wantagh CDP, New York – Racial and ethnic composition Note: the US Census treats Hispanic/Latino as an ethnic category. This table excludes Latinos from the racial categories and assigns them to a separate category. Hispanics/Latinos may be of any race.
| Race / Ethnicity (NH = Non-Hispanic) | Pop 2000 | Pop 2010 | Pop 2020 | % 2000 | % 2010 | % 2020 |
|---|---|---|---|---|---|---|
| White alone (NH) | 11,248 | 10,597 | 9,673 | 92.53% | 88.60% | 81.07% |
| Black or African American alone (NH) | 45 | 77 | 138 | 0.37% | 0.64% | 1.16% |
| Native American or Alaska Native alone (NH) | 1 | 1 | 3 | 0.01% | 0.01% | 0.03% |
| Asian alone (NH) | 215 | 294 | 375 | 1.77% | 2.46% | 3.14% |
| Native Hawaiian or Pacific Islander alone (NH) | 1 | 3 | 0 | 0.01% | 0.03% | 0.00% |
| Other race alone (NH) | 6 | 3 | 71 | 0.05% | 0.03% | 0.60% |
| Mixed race or Multiracial (NH) | 84 | 88 | 255 | 0.69% | 0.74% | 2.14% |
| Hispanic or Latino (any race) | 556 | 897 | 1,416 | 4.57% | 7.50% | 11.87% |
| Total | 12,156 | 11,960 | 11,931 | 100.00% | 100.00% | 100.00% |

=== 2020 census ===
As of the 2020 census, North Wantagh had a population of 11,931. The median age was 44.6 years. 20.4% of residents were under the age of 18 and 20.5% of residents were 65 years of age or older. For every 100 females there were 92.4 males, and for every 100 females age 18 and over there were 90.5 males age 18 and over.

100.0% of residents lived in urban areas, while 0.0% lived in rural areas.

There were 4,174 households in North Wantagh, of which 32.1% had children under the age of 18 living in them. Of all households, 63.2% were married-couple households, 11.3% were households with a male householder and no spouse or partner present, and 22.6% were households with a female householder and no spouse or partner present. About 19.2% of all households were made up of individuals and 13.4% had someone living alone who was 65 years of age or older.

There were 4,282 housing units, of which 2.5% were vacant. The homeowner vacancy rate was 0.8% and the rental vacancy rate was 3.4%.

=== 2000 census ===
As of the census of 2000, there were 12,156 people, 4,332 households, and 3,404 families residing in the CDP. The population density was 6,592.0 inhabitants per square mile (2,545.2/km^{2}). There were 4,374 housing units at an average density of 2,371.9 per square mile (915.8/km^{2}). The racial makeup of the CDP was 96.00% White, 0.45% African American, 0.01% Native American, 1.82% Asian, 0.01% Pacific Islander, 0.80% from other races, and 0.91% from two or more races. Hispanic or Latino of any race were 4.57% of the population.

There were 4,332 households, out of which 34.0% had children under the age of 18 living with them, 67.1% were married couples living together, 8.3% had a female householder with no husband present, and 21.4% were non-families. 18.8% of all households were made up of individuals, and 11.1% had someone living alone who was 65 years of age or older. The average household size was 2.80 and the average family size was 3.20.

In the CDP, the population was spread out, with 23.6% under the age of 18, 6.3% from 18 to 24, 29.3% from 25 to 44, 24.7% from 45 to 64, and 16.2% who were 65 years of age or older. The median age was 40 years. For every 100 females, there were 91.3 males. For every 100 females age 18 and over, there were 86.8 males.

The median income for a household in the CDP was $70,252, and the median income for a family was $76,345. Males had a median income of $53,295 versus $37,005 for females. The per capita income for the CDP was $30,214. About 1.4% of families and 2.9% of the population were below the poverty line, including 1.4% of those under age 18 and 5.7% of those age 65 or over.

== Parks and recreation ==
Forest City Community Park – owned and operated by the Town of Hempstead – is located within the Forest City section of the CDP, near North Wantagh's border with North Bellmore.

== Education ==
North Wantagh is served entirely by the following schools in the Levittown Union Free School District:

=== Elementary schools (K-5) ===
- East Broadway Elementary School
- Lee Road Elementary School
- Gardiners Avenue Elementary School

=== Middle schools (6-8) ===
- Jonas E. Salk Middle School

=== High school (9-12) ===
- General Douglas MacArthur High School

== Transportation ==
Public transportation in North Wantagh is provided by the n54/n55 lines of the Nassau Inter-County Express. The closest rail service is provided by the Wantagh station on the Long Island Rail Road's Babylon Branch.

The Southern State Parkway, Wantagh Parkway and Seaford-Oyster Bay Expressway all traverse and have exits/entrances within North Wantagh. The main commercial thoroughfare is Wantagh Avenue.
