= Shannon Fredericks =

American politician

Member-elect of the New York State Assembly from the 14th district
- Assuming office January 2027
- Succeeding: David McDonough

Personal details
- Party: Republican

Shannon Fredericks is an American politician. A member of the Republican Party, she is the member-elect for the 14th district of the New York State Assembly.
