= Levittown Union Free School District =

School district in the U.S. state of New York

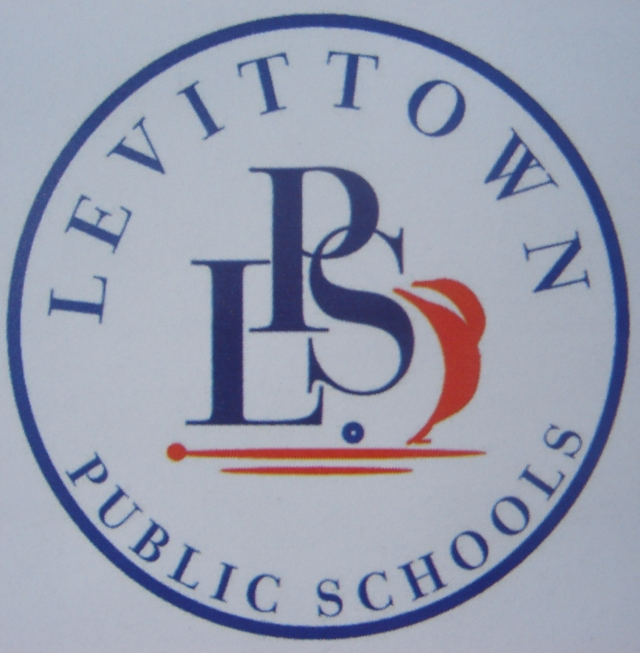

Address
- 150 Abbey Lane Levittown, New York, 11756; United States
- Coordinates: 40°43′6″N 73°30′41″W

District information
- Type: Public
- Grades: K–12
- Schools: 10

Students and staff
- Enrollment: 7,177 (as of 2022–23)
- Faculty: 585.5 FTEs
- Student–teacher ratio: 12.3:1

Other information
- Website: www.levittownschools.com

Levittown Union Free School District (LUFSD) is a school district in central Nassau County on Long Island, approximately ten miles east of New York City. The district approximately 5.5 square miles (14 km^{2}) includes parts of the following hamlets; Levittown, North Wantagh, and Seaford. Currently, there are six elementary schools (K-5), two middle schools (6-8), two high schools (9-12) and one career & technical center.

The school district sits on over 200 acres (0.81 km^{2}) of property, and its facilities occupy over 1,500,000 square feet (140,000 m^{2}). The district has a transportation complex of five buildings, a buildings and grounds complex of 4 buildings, a middle school leased to BOCES, 22 pump houses and storage sheds as well as vacant property on which once sat an elementary school. The district operates its own Transportation System, transporting over 4,000 students per day. Transportation is available for those students in Grades K-8 who live beyond 3/4 of a mile and 9-12 who live beyond 1.5 miles (2.4 km) from their respective school. The district implemented an all day Kindergarten program in 2011/12.

As of the 2022–23 school year, the district, which operates 10 schools, had an enrollment of 7,177 students and 585.5 classroom teachers (on an FTE basis), for a student–teacher ratio of 12.3:1.

The school district administration is headed by Tonie McDonald, the current Superintendent of Schools, appointed July 1, 2014. Her contract has been expanded expires on June 30, 2021. McDonald is a life long Levittown resident who taught and rose through the ranks of the district she now leads.

The Board of Education President is Peggy Marenghi. She was elected to the Board of Education until June 30, 2019.

== History ==
Levittown School District, which dates back to the 19th century, was originally called the Jerusalem School District of the Town of Hempstead. The school district actually services areas of Levittown, Wantagh, Seaford, Plainedge and a small part of Hicksville. It has approximately 7,400 students in 2014/15 a small uptick from the previous year. The district also has one of the largest special education programs in the country and is widely purported to be one of the best in the Special Education Field. Its 2014/15 budget was approx. 199,000,000 USD, up approximately 1.5 million from 2013/14. The district operates six elementary schools, two middle schools and two high schools. In 1983, Levittown Memorial High School, the district's third High school was closed due to falling enrollment, and now serves as a central office, The Gerald R. Claps Career and Technical Center and the Alternative HS as well. The district recently closed Laurel Lane, which until June 2009 was the site of the alternative Education High School. That building is now partially leased to the ELIJA School for approximately 125,000 per year. The district also owns, and leases the buildings called Seaman's Neck, a former elementary School. The school district owns the historic little red schoolhouse on North Jerusalem road. Built in 1876, it was originally the only school building in Jerusalem District #5 in the 19th century. It has been updated according to historical guidelines and is currently leased as a day care facility. The district also owns property on Pintail Lane, a former elementary school built in 1958. It was closed due to low enrollment in 1976 and the building remained vacant until 1983 when the property was sold to developers. Neighborhood protests led to numerous delays after the building was razed. The property remains vacant today and is under the maintenance of the LUFSD.

== Administration ==
The school district is run by a superintendent and 3 assistant superintendents, to whom different educational areas are assigned. The following is an updated list of Levittown's current administration:

- Tonie McDonald: Superintendent
- Todd Winch: Assistant Superintendent for Instruction
- Debbie Rifkin: Assistant Superintendent for Human Resources
- Christopher Dillion: Assistant Superintendent for Business and Finance

== Board of education ==
- President: Peggy Marenghi (term expires 06/30/2022)
- Vice President: Dillon Cain (term expires 6/30/2020)
- Trustee: Michael Pappas (term expires 6/30/2020)
- Trustee: Marianne Adrian (term expires 6/30/2021)
- Trustee: James Moran (term expires 6/30/2021)
- Trustee: Christina Lang (term expires 6/30/2022)
- Trustee: Jennifer Messina (term expires 6/30/2020)

== Schools ==
=== Elementary schools (K-5) ===
- Abbey Lane (erected 1949)
- East Broadway (erected 1952)
- Gardiners Avenue (erected 1949)
- Lee Road (erected 1957)
- Northside (erected 1951)
- Summit Lane (erected 1952)

==== Closed Schools ====
- Seaman Neck Elementary School (1955—1997); still owned by the district, now leased by Nassau County as a special education facility for students ages 10–14.
- Pintail Lane Primary School (1958—1976); closed due to declining enrollment. Property was sold to developer pending approval of substandard lot size housing. Did not pass by Zoning Board. Building was razed. Aerial photos of site still show footprint of former school building.
- Cherrywood Elementary School (1958—mid-1970s); closed due to declining population. The building was razed in the late 1970s and townhouses were built on the property.
- Laurel Lane Primary School (1956—2009); closed in 2009 after Alternative High School was merged into Voc. Ed building. Laurel Lane was re-opened in 2014 as a school for autistic children.
- Jerusalem District No. 5 Schoolhouse, a.k.a. 1876 Little Red School House; built in 1876, it was originally the only school building in Jerusalem District #5 in the 19th century. It has been updated according to historical guidelines and is currently leased out to a private day care facility.

=== Middle schools (6-8) ===
- Jonas E. Salk (erected 1957)
- Wisdom Lane (erected 1954)

=== High schools (9-12) ===
- Division Avenue High School (erected 1948)
- General Douglas MacArthur (erected 1961)

=== Alternative Schools ===
- Levittown Memorial Education Center (erected 1953); the technical wing of the former high school was renamed the Gerald R. Claps Career and Technical Center.
- Laurel Lane Alternative Education High School (erected 1956); closed and merged into the Levittown Memorial Education Center. It is currently partially leased to The ELIJA School.

== Notable alumni ==
- Steve Israel, Representative for New York's third congressional district
- Slim Jim Phantom, drummer for Stray Cats
- Sterling Morrison and Maureen "Mo" Tucker of the Velvet Underground
- Ellie Greenwich, songwriter
- Gian Villante, UFC Fighter
