= Island Trees School District v. Pico =

Board of Education v. Pico
- Supreme Court of the United States

Argued March 2, 1982 Decided June 25, 1982
- Full case name: Board of Education, Island Trees Union Free School District No. 26, et al. v. Pico, by his next friend Pico, et al.
- Citations: 457 U.S. 853 (more) 102 S. Ct. 2799; 73 L. Ed. 2d 435; 1982 U.S. LEXIS 8; 8 Media L. Rep. 1721

Case history
- Prior: Pico v. Bd. of Educ. Island Trees Union Free Sch. Dist. 26, 474 F. Supp. 387 (E.D.N.Y. 1979); reversed, 638 F.2d 404 (2d Cir. 1980); cert. granted, 454 U.S. 891 (1981).

Holding
- The First Amendment limits the power of local school boards to remove library books from junior high schools and high schools.

Court membership
- Chief Justice Warren E. Burger Associate Justices William J. Brennan Jr. · Byron White; Thurgood Marshall · Harry Blackmun; Lewis F. Powell Jr. · William Rehnquist; John P. Stevens · Sandra Day O'Connor

Case opinions
- Plurality: Brennan, joined by Marshall, Stevens; Blackmun (all but parts II-A(1))
- Concurrence: Blackmun (in part)
- Concurrence: White (in judgment)
- Dissent: Burger, joined by Powell, Rehnquist, O'Connor
- Dissent: Powell
- Dissent: Rehnquist, joined by Burger, Powell
- Dissent: O'Connor

Laws applied
- U.S. Const. amend. I

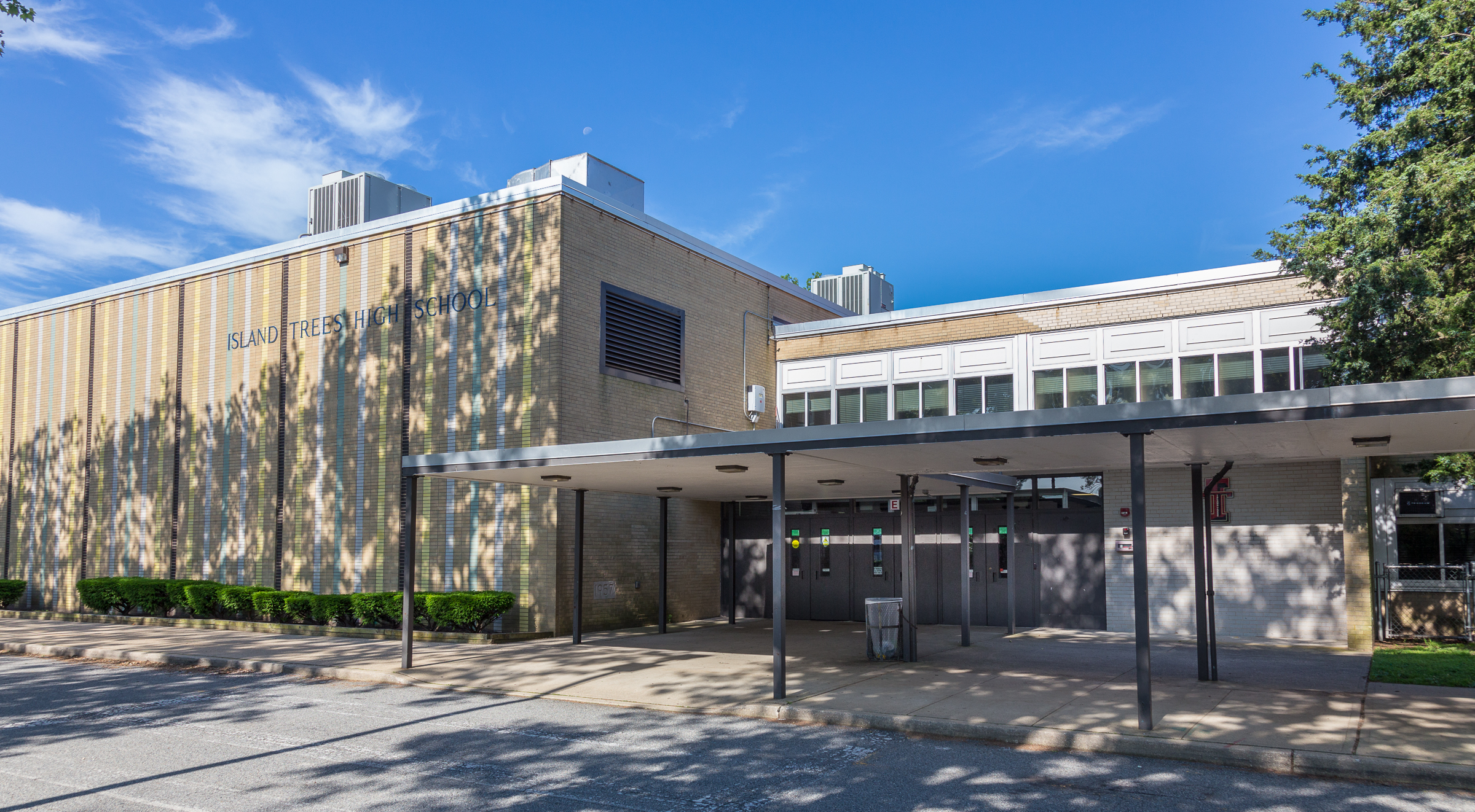
Island Trees High School in 2019

Board of Education, Island Trees Union Free School District No. 26 v. Pico, 457 U.S. 853 (1982), is a landmark case in which the United States Supreme Court split on the First Amendment issue of local school boards removing library books from junior high schools and high schools. Four justices ruled that it was unconstitutional, four concluded the contrary (with perhaps a few minor exceptions), and one concluded that the court need not decide the question on the merits. Pico was the first Supreme Court case to consider the right to receive information in a library setting under the First Amendment, but the court's fractured plurality decision left the scope of this right unclear.

== Facts ==
=== Background ===
In September 1975, the Island Trees Board of Education received a list of books deemed inappropriate by Parents of New York United. The board temporarily removed the books from school libraries and formed a committee to review the list. The committee found that five of the nine books should be returned, but the board overruled the decision and returned only two of the books.

A group of five high school students (including one junior high school student) who, according to oral argument, were 17, 16, 15, 14, and 13 years old at the time of the removal of the books, led by Steven Pico, filed a lawsuit against the school board by claiming a violation of First Amendment rights. The United States District Court for the Eastern District of New York granted summary judgment in favor of the school board, citing the discretion given to a school board's authority in terms of its political philosophy. The judgment was challenged and remanded by the Second Circuit after questions rose of the school board's motives.

=== Case ===
According to the syllabus of the case:

Petitioner Board of Education of the Island Trees Union Free School District, rejecting recommendations of a committee of parents and school staff that it had appointed, ordered that certain books, which the Board characterized as "anti-American, anti-Christian, anti-Sem[i]tic, and just plain filthy," be removed from high school and junior high school libraries. Respondent students then brought this action for declaratory and injunctive relief under 42 U.S.C. § 1983 against the Board and petitioner Board members, alleging that the Board's actions had denied respondents their rights under the First Amendment. The District Court granted summary judgment in petitioners' favor. The Court of Appeals reversed and remanded for a trial on the merits of respondents' allegations.

Eleven books were the subject of the case. The books were:

- Slaughterhouse-Five, by Kurt Vonnegut, Jr.
- The Naked Ape, by Desmond Morris
- Down These Mean Streets, by Piri Thomas
- Best Short Stories of Negro Writers, edited by Langston Hughes
- Go Ask Alice, of anonymous authorship
- Laughing Boy, by Oliver LaFarge
- Black Boy, by Richard Wright
- A Hero Ain't Nothin' but a Sandwich, by Alice Childress
- Soul on Ice, by Eldridge Cleaver
- A Reader for Writers, edited by Jerome Archer
- The Fixer, by Bernard Malamud

The first nine titles above were removed from shelves of the High School library; A Reader for Writers was removed from the Junior High School library because it contained the 1729 satirical essay A Modest Proposal by Jonathan Swift which the Board found to be offensive; and The Fixer was removed from the curriculum of a 12th-grade literature course.

== Plurality ==
No single opinion commanded a majority of the court or announced any legal binding rule.

=== Justice Brennan's opinion ===
Justice Brennan announced the judgment of the court affirming the Court of Appeals and delivered an opinion joined by Justices Marshall and Stevens and joined in all but Part II-A(1) by Justice Blackmun. Justice Blackmun filed an opinion concurring in part and concurring the judgment.

Justice Brennan noted the court had previously held that students do not "shed their constitutional rights to freedom of speech or expression at the schoolhouse gate" (Tinker v. Des Moines School District). Brennan also reasoned that the First Amendment protects not only the right to express ideas but also the right to receive them. The First Amendment, in this case, included the right to read library books of the student's choosing.

Brennan concluded the plurality opinion by noting that the court's holding was narrowly limited to the extent of the school board's authority to remove books from the school library:

As noted earlier, nothing in our decision today affects in any way the discretion of a local school board to choose books to add to the libraries of their schools. Because we are concerned in this case with the suppression of ideas, our holding [457 U.S. 853, 872] today affects only the discretion to remove books. In brief, we hold that local school boards may not remove books from school library shelves simply because they dislike the ideas contained in those books and seek by their removal to "prescribe what shall be orthodox in politics, nationalism, religion, or other matters of opinion." West Virginia Board of Education v. Barnette, 319 U.S., at 642. Such purposes stand inescapably condemned by our precedents.

=== Justice Blackmun's concurrence ===
Justice Blackmun, concurring, concluded that a proper balance between the limited constitutional restriction imposed on school officials by the First Amendment and the broad state authority to regulate education would be struck by holding that school officials may not remove books from school libraries for the purpose of restricting access to the political perspectives or social ideas discussed in the books when that action is motivated simply by the officials' disapproval of the ideas involved.

=== Justice White's concurrence ===
Justice White provided the necessary fifth vote for the outcome, which was to allow the case to proceed in the lower court. However, his reasoning was different from that of the plurality and of Justice Blackmun, and he expressly refused to opine on the First Amendment question.

Rather, he rejected the plurality's decision to speak about "the extent to which the First Amendment limits the discretion of the school board to remove books from the school library," and he concluded that there was "no necessity for doing so at this point. When findings of fact and conclusions of law are made by the District Court, that may end the case. If, for example, the District Court concludes after a trial that the books were removed for their vulgarity, there may be no appeal. In any event, if there is an appeal, if there is dissatisfaction with the subsequent Court of Appeals' judgment, and if certiorari is sought and granted, there will be time enough to address the First Amendment issues that may then be presented."

As a consequence, the Justices split 4–4 on the First Amendment question and so no precedent was set for future cases.

== Dissents ==
Chief Justice Burger filed a dissenting opinion in which Justices Powell, Rehnquist, and O'Connor joined. Justices Powell and O'Connor each filed an additional dissenting opinion. Justice Rehnquist filed a dissenting opinion in which Chief Justice Burger and Justice Powell joined.

=== Chief Justice Burger's dissent ===
Writing about the plurality opinion, Burger stated, "Were this to become the law, this Court would come perilously close to becoming a 'super censor' of school board library decisions." Justice Burger disagreed with the plurality's view that students have an enforceable right to receive information and ideas that are contained in junior and senior high school library books: "[n]o such right... has ever been recognized." Discussing the role and obligation of school boards, he stated:

Presumably all activity within a primary or secondary school involves the conveyance of information and at least an implied approval of the worth of that information. How are "fundamental values" to be inculcated except by having school boards make content-based decisions about the appropriateness of retaining materials in the school library and curriculum. In order to fulfill its function, an elected school board must express its views on the subjects which are taught to its students. In doing so those elected officials express the views of their community; they may err, of course, and the voters may remove them. It is a startling erosion of the very idea of democratic government to have this Court arrogate to itself the power the plurality asserts today.

He also disagreed with the plurality's distinction between acquisition decisions and removal decisions of the library: "It does not follow that the decision to remove a book is less 'official suppression' than the decision not to acquire a book desired by someone." He ended, "I categorically reject this notion that the Constitution dictates that judges, rather than parents, teachers, and local school boards, must determine how the standards of morality and vulgarity are to be treated in the classroom."

=== Justice Powell's dissent ===
Justice Powell's dissenting opinion reflected his belief that "the States and locally elected school boards should have the responsibility for determining the educational policy for the public schools." He believed that school boards were "uniquely local and democratic institutions" and that the school boards were in the best position to decide what educational policy decisions should be made in their school district. He closed his dissenting opinion by calling the plurality's decision "a debilitating encroachment upon the institutions of a free people".

=== Justice Rehnquist's dissent ===
Justice Rehnquist's dissenting opinion first focused on the procedural posture of the case and disagreed with the approach taken by the plurality opinion: "I entirely disagree with Justice Brennan's treatment of the constitutional issue, I also disagree with his opinion for the entirely separate reason that it is not remotely tailored to the facts presented in this case."

He found a distinction between the actions of the government as educator and the actions of the government as sovereign:

With these differentiated roles of government in mind, it is helpful to assess the role of government as educator as compared with the role of government as sovereign. When it acts as an educator... the government is engaged in inculcating social values and knowledge in relatively impressionable young people. Obviously, there are innumerable decisions to be made as to what courses should be taught, what books should be purchased, or what teachers should be employed.... In the very course of administering the many-faceted operations of a school district, the mere decision to purchase some books will necessarily preclude the possibility of purchasing others.... In each of these instances, however, the book or the exposure to the subject matter may be acquired elsewhere. The managers of the school district are not proscribing it as to the citizenry in general, but are simply determining that it will not be included in the curriculum or school library.

He also took issue with the plurality's decision to find the "right to receive information" as an inherent corollary of the rights of free speech and of the press, which are guaranteed by the First Amendment: "It is the very existence of a right to receive information, in the junior high school and high school setting, which I find wholly unsupported by our past decisions and inconsistent with the necessarily selective process of elementary and secondary education." He considered education to consist of selective presentation and explanation of ideas and that the right to receive information doctrine is improperly placed in elementary and secondary education.

=== Justice O'Connor's dissent ===
In a very short dissenting opinion, Justice O'Connor found the school board to take on a special role as educator. She considered educational decisions such as suitable material to be properly relegated to the elected members of the school board: "If the school board can set the curriculum, select teachers, and determine initially what books to purchase for the school library, it surely can decide which books to discontinue or remove from the school library so long as it does not also interfere with the right of students to read the material and discuss it."

== Subsequent developments ==
Two stage musicals have been produced based on the case: The Line, in 1985; and Breaking Out in Harmony, in 1994.

== See also ==
- Book censorship in the United States
- List of United States Supreme Court cases, volume 457
