= Wurzel (disambiguation) =

Würzel (Michael Richard Burston) was a British musician.

Wurzel, the German word for root, may also refer to:

- The Wurzels, an English band
- Mangelwurzel, a root vegetable primarily used as cattle-fodder
- Gabriele Wurzel, German politician
- Worzel Gummidge, a book and TV adaptation
- Fred Basset, a British comic strip known in Germany as "Wurzel"

== See also ==
- Wurtzel, disambiguation
- Worzel (disambiguation)
- Root (disambiguation)
