= Laughing Boy (novel) =

1929 novel by Oliver La Farge

- First edition
- Author: Oliver La Farge
- Cover artist: Robert Overholtzer
- Language: English
- Genre: Historical fiction
- Set in: Southwestern U.S. (1915)
- Publisher: Houghton Mifflin
- Publication date: 1929
- Publication place: United States
- Media type: Print
- Pages: 302
- Awards: Pulitzer Prize
- ISBN: 0-618-44672-9
- Text: Laughing Boy online

Laughing Boy is a 1929 novel by Oliver La Farge about the struggles of the Navajo in Southwestern United States to reconcile their culture with that of the United States. It won the Pulitzer Prize in 1930.

It was adapted as a film of the same name, released in 1934.

== Plot ==
The novel is set in 1915, when the first motorized vehicle was driven into Native American territory. It concerns a boy named Laughing Boy who seeks to become an adult who can be respected among his Navajo tribe. They live in a place known as T'o Tlakai. He has been initiated into tribal ways, is an accomplished jeweler, and can compete favorably at events such as racing wild horses, which he has either caught or capably traded at market.

At a tribal event, Laughing Boy encounters a beautiful, mysterious young woman known as Slim Girl, and the two are soon attracted to each other. Complications arise immediately from her past experiences in the Indian Schools, boarding schools run under the auspices of the federal government for education and assimilation of Native Americans. Native American children were sent to these schools from numerous tribes, where they were forced to abandon their individual languages and cultures and instead had to adopt the English language and Western cultural standards.

These complications affect the relationship and his family's view of it in ways that slowly unfold and intertwine as the novel progresses. It offers a rare glimpse into the Navajo lifestyle and territory.

The novel was awarded the Pulitzer Prize for Fiction and was published as an Armed Services Edition during World War II.

== Adaptation ==
In 1934, Laughing Boy was adapted as a film of the same name, directed by W. S. Van Dyke. It starred Ramón Novarro as Laughing Boy and Lupe Vélez as Slim Girl.

== Censorship ==
The book was removed from high school library shelves by the board of education of the Island Trees Union Free School District in New York. This case became the subject of a U.S. Supreme Court case in 1982.
