= David McDonough =

American politician

David G. McDonough

Member of the New York State Assembly from the 14th district
- Incumbent
- Assumed office February 12, 2002
- Preceded by: Kate Murray
- Succeeded by: Shannon Fredericks (elect)

Personal details
- Born: March 31, 1937 (age 89)
- Party: Republican
- Spouse: Carolyn
- Children: 3
- Education: Columbia University
- Profession: State Representative
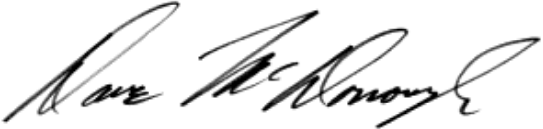
- Signature
- Website: Official website

David G. McDonough is a member of the New York State Assembly, representing the 14th district, which includes portions of the town of Hempstead in Nassau County on Long Island. A Republican, McDonough was first elected through a special election in 2002.

== Education and career ==
McDonough formerly served in the United States Coast Guard and the United States Air Force and later earned a Bachelor of Arts degree in economics from Columbia University. He also graduated from the American Academy of Dramatic Arts.

Prior to elected office, he served as the past president of the Nassau County Council of Chambers of Commerce. Prior to that, from 1994 to 1998, McDonough served four terms as president of the Merrick Chamber of Commerce.

In 2001, Assemblywoman Kate Murray was elected as clerk of the town of Hempstead, vacating the Assembly seat. As a result, a special election was called, and McDonough was nominated by Republicans as their candidate. In a competitive election, he defeated Democrat Steve November 52% to 48%. Since then, he has never faced serious opposition for reelection.

In the Assembly, McDonough is the chairman of a Task Force on Public Safety, and is the ranking member on the Assembly Transportation Committee.

== Personal life ==
He and his wife, Carolyn, reside in Merrick, New York and have three children and four grandchildren.

New York State Assembly
Preceded by Kate Murray	New York State Assembly, 19th District; 2002–present	Incumbent
