= Worzel =

Worzel may refer to:

- Worzel Gummidge, a fictional scarecrow created by Barbara Euphan Todd
- J. Lamar Worzel (1919–2008), American geophysicist
- nickname of Jeff Rich (born 1953), former drummer for the English rock band Status Quo
- Worzel Gummidge was the nickname of the politician Michael Foot (1913-2010)

== See also ==
- Wurzel (disambiguation)
