= Division Avenue High School =

High school in Nassau County, New York, United States

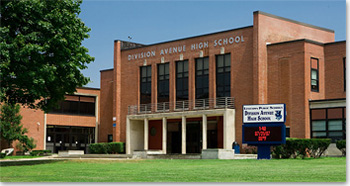

Location
- 120 Division Ave; Levittown, New York 11756; United States; 40°43′45″N 73°31′32″W

Information
- Type: Public
- Motto: Sans egal (Latin for "Without Equal")
- Established: 1955
- School district: Levittown Union Free School District
- CEEB code: 332798
- NCES School ID: 361716001520
- Principal: Jeffrey Myers
- Teaching staff: 97.16 (on an FTE basis)
- Grades: 9-12
- Enrollment: 1,023 (2023-2024)
- Student to teacher ratio: 10.53
- Campus: Suburban: Large
- Colors: Blue and Gray
- Mascot: Blue Dragons
- Nickname: Dragons; Lady Dragons
- Newspaper: Dragon Tales
- Yearbook: Perspectum
- Website: www.levittownschools.com/division/

Division Avenue High School is a four-year public high school in Levittown, New York on Long Island. It is one of two traditional high schools in the Levittown Union Free School District. As of the 2023-24 school year, the school enrolled 1023 students.

== History ==
The building originally known as Division Avenue School opened in 1949 as an elementary school. It was then expanded and reopened as Division Avenue High School in 1956 to 9th graders, who became its first graduating class in 1960. Division Avenue was the second high school in the district after the now-closed Levittown Memorial High School.

== Awards and recognition ==
In 2008, Newsweek ranked the school 1,127 on the list of the top 1,300 US schools. In 2007, it was ranked 873. In 2006, it was ranked as 1,059.

The New York State Education Department named DAHS a Reward School for 2015–16.

== Sports ==
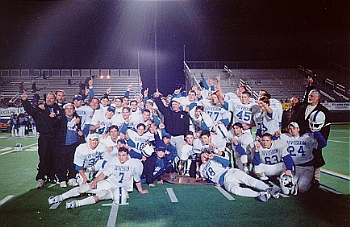
The 1996 Rutgers Cup Champions

Division has over 25 varsity and junior varsity level athletic teams. They include badminton, baseball, basketball (boys' and girls') bowling, football, lacrosse (boys' and girls'), soccer (boys' and girls'), softball, tennis, track and field, volleyball, and wrestling.

The Division Avenue football team were the 1996 New York State Rutgers Cup champions. Division has also racked up many accomplishments in other sports. In recent years, the girls' bowling team has won two county titles, and the wrestling, girls' soccer, and girls' volleyball teams have won conference titles. The baseball, boys' and girls' lacrosse, and softball teams have all advanced to the county semifinals or beyond in the past few years as well. In boys' lacrosse, Division has produced 13 All-Americans, including Maryland's all-time leading goal scorer, Bob Boniello. They were also 2010 Conference B Champs, tied with Garden City and Wantagh for first place. The Division cross country team won back-to-back New York State Class C Championships in 1969–70. The baseball, girls' basketball, and both the boys' and girls' lacrosse teams play in the top conference of their respective classes. During the 2009–2010 school year, both the girls' soccer and girls' basketball teams went to the Nassau County finals. The girls' basketball team defeated Lynbrook for the first county title in the program's history. The Lady Dragons went on to claim the Class A Long Island Championship. In the 2017 season, Division Lady Dragons girls lacrosse was ranked number one in their conference, winning the conference championships.

== Competitive marching band ==
Division Avenue fields a competitive marching band, composed of students in grades 8-12 from all high schools and middle schools in the Levittown School District. The Marching Band competes in the New York State Field Band Conference, and participates in several competitions during the fall including the Newsday Marching Band Festival and the state championship competition at the JMA Wireless Dome in Syracuse. The band placed first in the Small School 3 Class in 2022, with a championship score of 88.40.

== Pressbox and bleachers fire ==
According to arson/bomb squad detectives, the Levittown Fire Department responded Sunday January 3, 2010 at 2:50 p.m. with five trucks and 50 firefighters to a 911 call for smoke in the vicinity of the concession stand at Division Avenue High School's football field.

The blaze, deemed suspicious, caused "extensive damage" estimated at more than $200,000 to the bleachers, gym equipment, rubberized track, and concession stand. There were no reported injuries. The football field and school were unoccupied at the time of the inferno.

An investigation by the Nassau County Fire Marshal's Office, arson/bomb squad and Eighth Squad was completed in April 2010. The students responsible, who were between the ages of 11 and 13, were reprimanded, and the costs to the property were delegated to the families of the children.

The cause of the fire was ruled as arson with gasoline.

== Notable alumni ==
- Jimmy Failla (born 1976) American stand up comedian and talk show host
- Sterling Morrison (1942–1995, class of 1960), guitarist for rock band The Velvet Underground
- Brandon Reilly (born 1981, class of 1999), lead singer and guitarist for rock band Nightmare of You
- Moe Tucker (born 1944, class of 1961), drummer for rock band The Velvet Underground
- Len Wein (1948–2017), comic-book writer and editor
