= Levittown Memorial High School =

Former school in New York, United States

Coordinates: 40.7178°N 73.5115°W

Levittown Memorial High School was a public high school for grades 7-12 that was operated by the Levittown Union Free School District. Opened in 1953, the school closed in 1983 and has been used by the district for its offices and as the site of the Gerald R. Claps Career and Technical Center.

== Description ==
The school was the district's first high school, constructed to serve the influx of new residents who had moved in to the suburban development in Levittown, New York. In the face of declining enrollment, the school was closed in 1983 and repurposed for district offices and as a career center.

== Notable alumni ==
- Ellie Greenwich (1940–2009), pop music singer, songwriter, and record producer
- Kate Murray (born 1962), politician and attorney who served in the New York State Assembly and was Supervisor of the Town of Hempstead, New York
- Lt. Glenn E. Wilkinson, FDNY, died in the collapse of WTC Tower One on 9/11/01 in the act of rescue.
