= Island Trees High School =

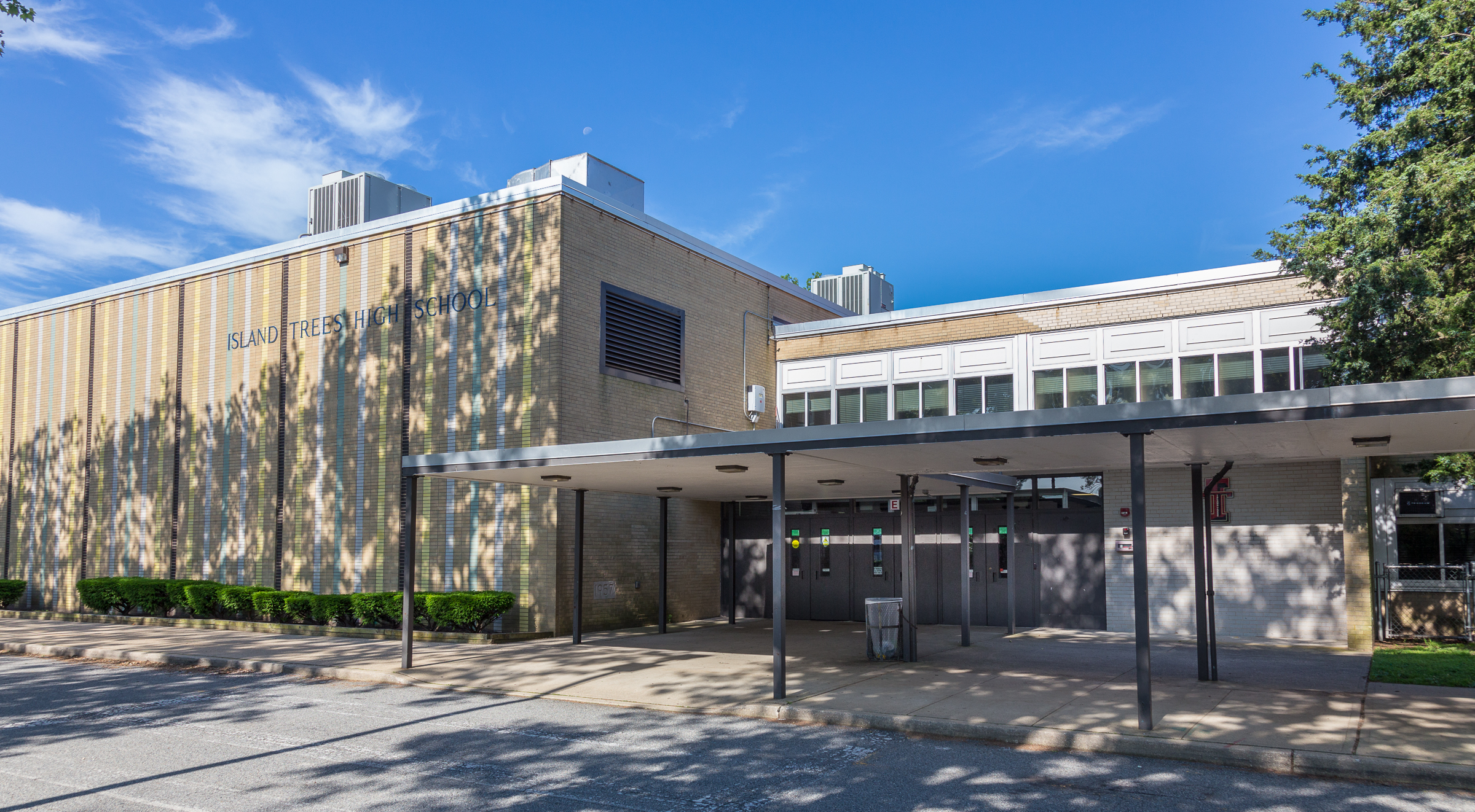
- Island Trees High School

Location
- 59 Straight Lane; Levittown, New York 11756; United States; 40°43′20″N 73°29′36″W

Information
- Type: Public
- Locale: Suburban, Large
- School district: Island Trees Union Free School District
- NCES District ID: 3615510
- NCES School ID: 361551001320
- Principal: Jessica Sventoraitis
- Teaching staff: 66.39 (on an FTE basis)
- Grades: 9–12
- Enrollment: 701 (2024–25)
- Student to teacher ratio: 10.56
- Colors: Red and White
- Mascot: Bulldogs
- Nickname: ITHS
- Yearbook: Sequioan
- Website: www.islandtrees.org

Island Trees High School is a coeducational public high school serving students in ninth grade through twelfth grade, in Levittown, New York, United States, 31.0 miles east of Manhattan. It is a part of the Island Trees Union Free School District. The school offers various clubs, electives, and AP courses. Island Trees High School serves portions of Levittown, Bethpage and Seaford.

== Statistics ==
As of the 2016–17 school year, the school had an enrollment of 746 students and 59 classroom teachers (on a full-time equivalent basis), for a student–teacher ratio of 12.74:1. There were 145 students (19.4% of enrollment) eligible for free lunch under the National School Lunch Act and 38 (5% of students) eligible for reduced-cost lunch. The dropout rate was 1%.

== Notable alumni ==
- Marshall Avener – gymnast
- Kevin Covais – American Idol finalist
- Tom Kapinos – screen and television writer
- Jesse Kinch – rock singer, songwriter and guitar player
- Donnie Klang – singer-songwriter
- Eddie Money – rock guitarist, saxophonist and singer-songwriter with 11 top-40 songs
