= MacArthur High School (Levittown, New York) =

Public high school in Nassau County, New York, United States

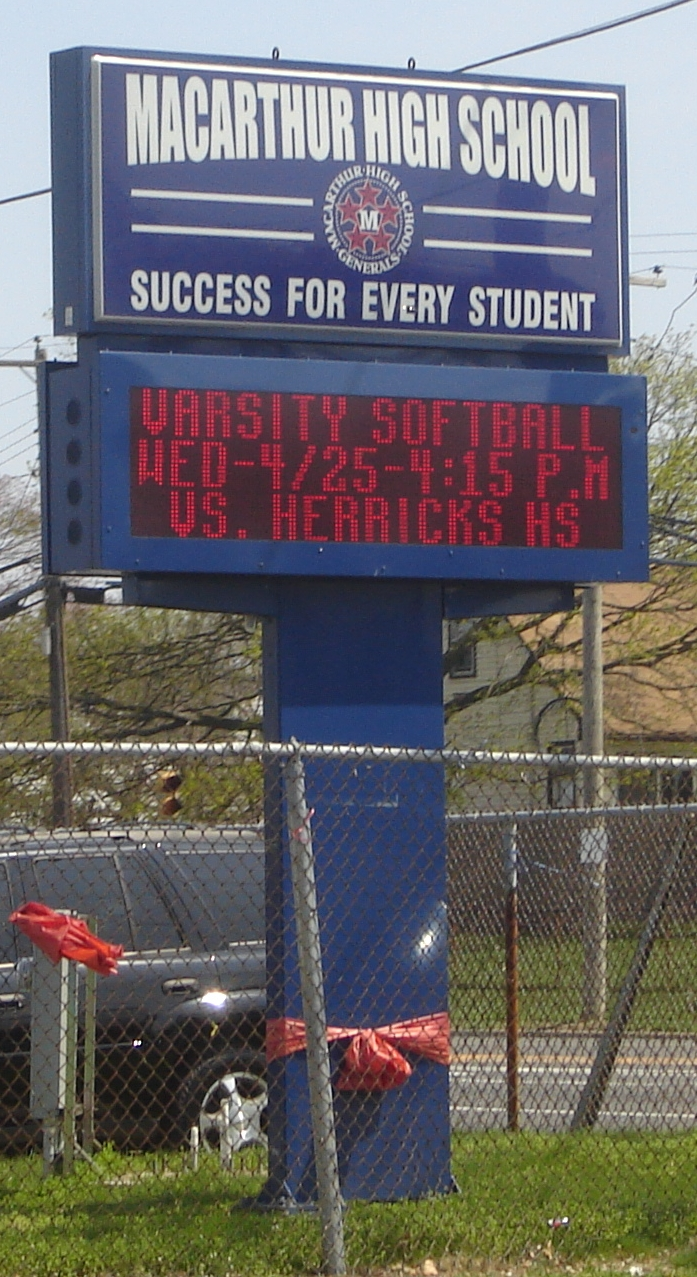
- MacArthur High School sign

Location
- 3369 Old Jerusalem Rd; Levittown, New York 11756; United States
- Coordinates: 40°42′14″N 73°30′29″W

Information
- Type: Public
- School district: Levittown Union Free School District
- NCES School ID: 361716001523
- Principal: Joseph Sheehan
- Teaching staff: 113.87 (on an FTE basis)
- Grades: 9-12
- Enrollment: 1,263 (2023-2024)
- Student to teacher ratio: 11.09
- Campus: Suburban: Large
- Colors: Red, White and Blue
- Mascot: MacArthur General
- Team name: Generals
- Rival: Division Avenue High School; Wantagh Senior High School
- Yearbook: Commander
- Website: www.levittownschools.com/macarthur/

MacArthur High School is a public high school located in Levittown, New York. One of two high schools in the Levittown Union Free School District, the school is named after United States General Douglas MacArthur. As of the 2023–24 school year, the school enrolled 1263 students.

According to the 2007 Newsweek Magazine issue of Top 1,200 U.S. schools, MacArthur High School was ranked as #518.

In 2024 the school ranked #1,222 in National Rankings, #128 in New York High Schools, and #159 in New York, NY Metro Area High Schools.

== Renaissance Program ==
Adopted through a unanimous vote of the school's faculty in the spring of 1994, the Renaissance Program rewards students who excel in academics. Students who pass everything, including midterms, finals, and regents, are hosted at a semi-annual breakfast. Students receive cards in either platinum, gold, blue, or gray, depending upon their grade average or status as an Honor Society member. These cards entitle the students to various "special perks and privileges", including discounts on tickets to school plays and dances. The four-year Renaissance card-holders of every senior class are hosted at an additional special brunch.

== Music and theater ==
MacArthur's Music program includes symphonic band (which includes marching band), orchestra, four levels of guitar class, electronic music, music theory, and advanced placement music theory, various choruses, jazz ensemble, music of the 20th century, and multiple levels of piano classes.

The marching band (accompanied by kickline and color guard) participates at football games, parades, and the annual Newsday Festival at Hofstra University. They are known as the MacArthur Symphonic Band.

The guitar program hosts an annual "Guitar Shredding" competition in which five star students of the year's class perform a freestyle and improvise solos over backing tracks to win prize and acclaim among their peers.

The musical theater program offers theater classes and produces seasonal plays and musicals.

== Sports ==
MacArthur has over 25 varsity and junior varsity level athletic teams. They include badminton, baseball, basketball (boys and girls) bowling, football, lacrosse (boys and girls), soccer (boys and girls), softball, tennis, track and field, volleyball, and wrestling.

The MacArthur High School varsity baseball team was crowned New York State champions in 1994.

The varsity football team has captured two Nassau County championships. The first came in 2002 and the second in 2015.

== Notable alumni ==
- David Catapano — celebrity chef
- David Falk — sports agent
- Bill Griffith — cartoonist best known for his comic strip Zippy the Pinhead
- Steve Israel — congressman
- Olivia Mellan (class of 1964) — money conflict resolution coach and author
- Candace Pert (class of 1964) — neuroscientist
- Sirah (rapper) — Grammy Award winning artist
- Cipha Sounds — Stand-up comic, DJ
- Gian Villante — UFC Mixed Martial Artist
