= Island Trees Union Free School District =

School district in the U.S. state of New York

Address
- 74 Farmedge Road Levittown, Nassau, New York, 11756, 11756; United States United States
- Coordinates: 40°44′10″N 73°29′59″W

District information
- Type: Public
- Motto: Home Of The Bulldogs
- Grades: K–12
- Established: 1902
- President: Michael T Rich Jr
- Vice-president: Larry Ortolani
- Superintendent: Charles Murphy
- Asst. superintendent(s): Elizabeth Roemer- Curriculum and Instruction Lauren Lombardi- Special Ed
- Business administrator: Susan Unnold
- School board: Brian Fielding Ted Maleska Amy Martin Vinny Papandrea Christian Soto
- NCES District ID: 3615510

Students and staff
- Students: 2,195 (2020–2021)
- Teachers: 180.7 (on an FTE basis)
- Staff: 197.82 (on an FTE basis)
- Student–teacher ratio: 12.15:1
- Athletic conference: New York Section 8
- Colors: Black White and Red

Other information
- Website: www.islandtrees.org

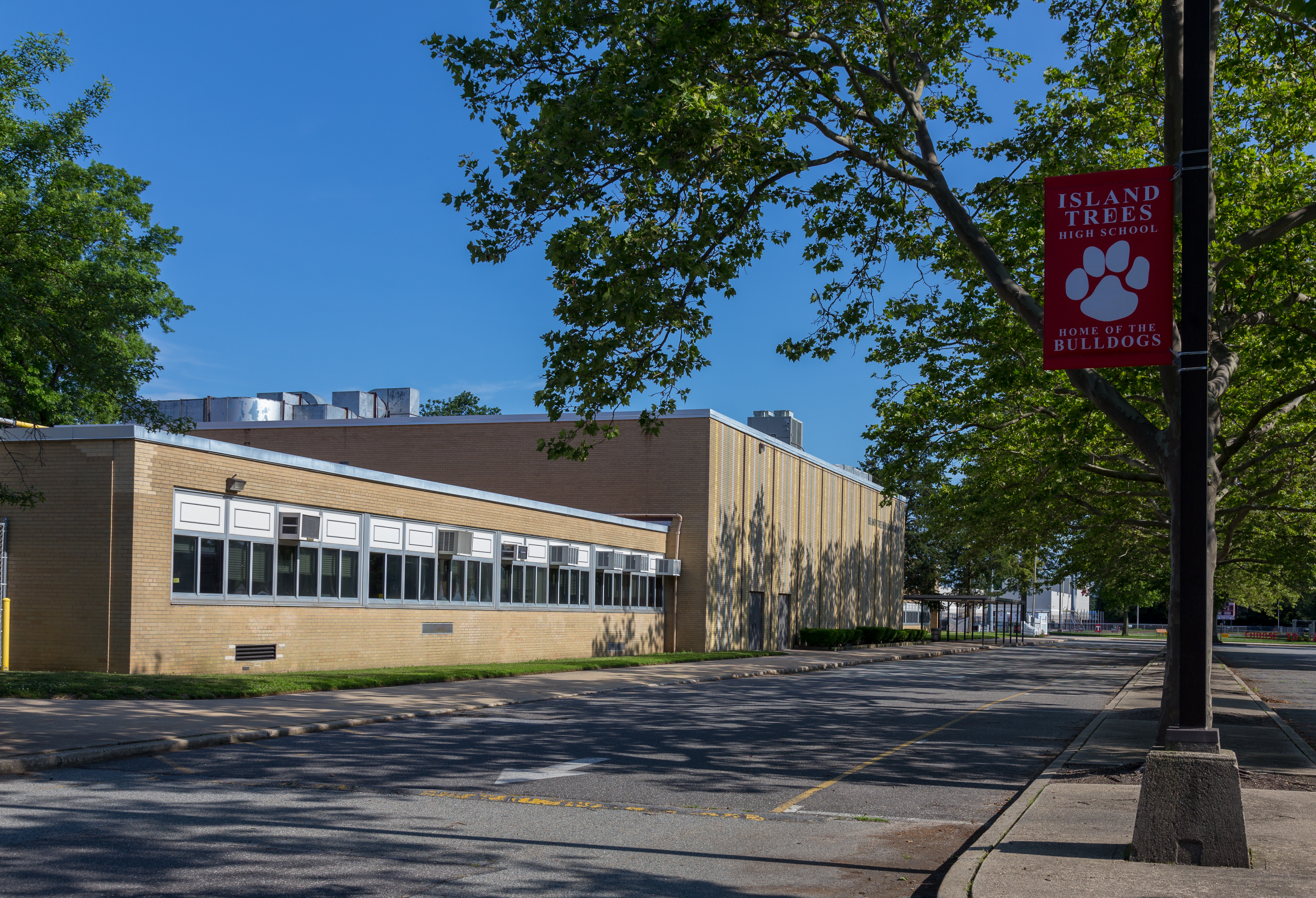
Island Trees High School

Island Trees Union Free School District is a school district in central Nassau County on Long Island, approximately 31 miles east of New York City. The district includes parts of the following hamlets; Levittown, Bethpage, Plainedge, and Seaford.

The Island Trees School District gained notoriety in the United States Supreme Court case Island Trees School District v. Pico regarding censorship of books in school libraries.

== History ==
The School District dates back to 1902. In 1982, the district went to the US Supreme Court to defend banning books in Island Trees School District v. Pico.

== Schools ==
=== Elementary schools (K-4) ===
- J. Fred Sparke Elementary
- Michael F. Stokes Elementary

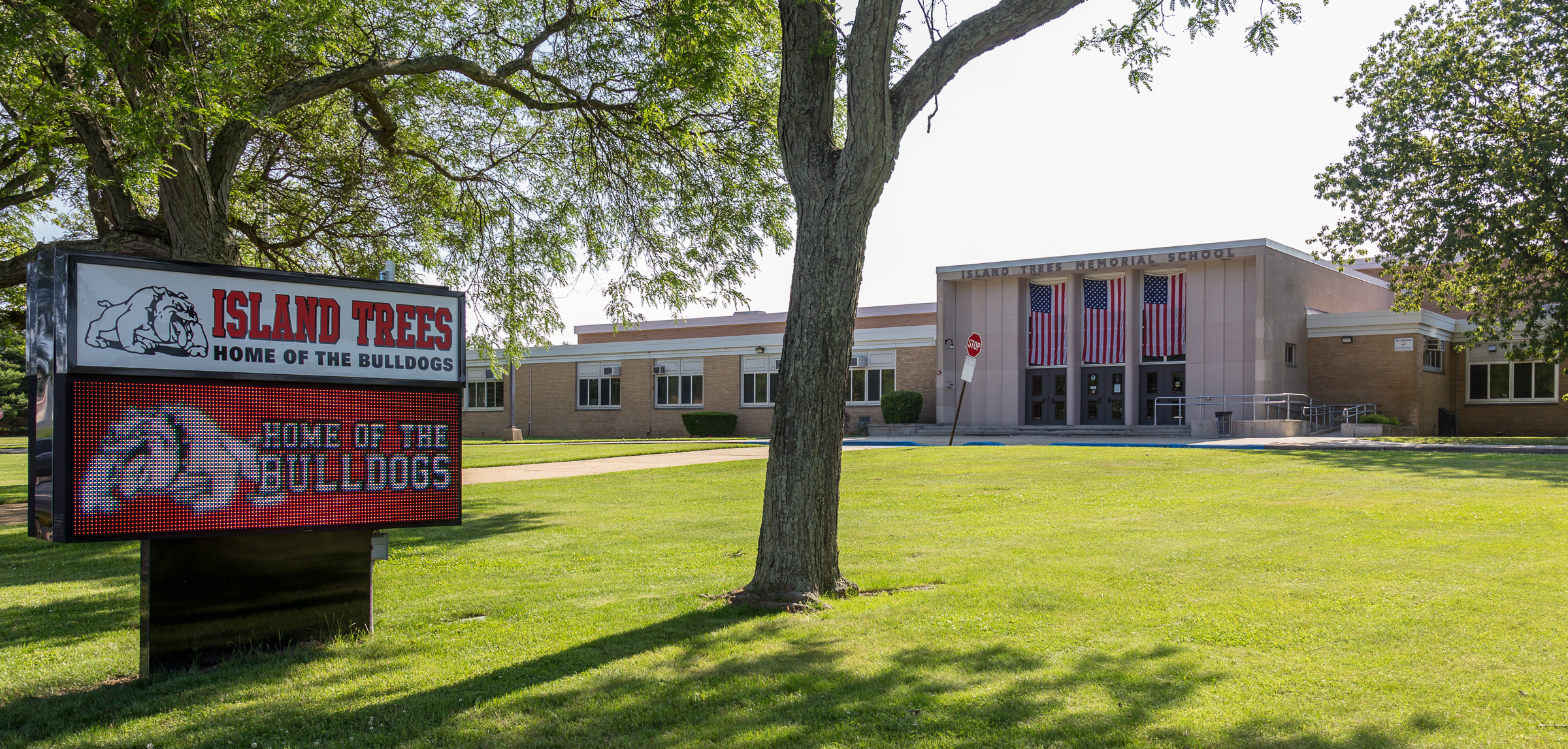
Island Trees Memorial Middle School

=== Middle schools (5-8) ===
- Island Trees Memorial Middle School

=== High school (9-12) ===
- Island Trees High School

=== Other ===
- Early Childhood Center at the Geneva Gallow School, Bethpage
- Island Trees Public Library, Bethpage
- Dr. Charles Murphy is the Superintendent as of 25-26

== Notable alumni ==
- Kevin Covais, former American Idol contestant and actor.
- Tom Kapinos, American television executive producer and screenwriter best known for his creation of the television series Californication.
- Donnie J. Klang of Making The Band 4.
- Edward Joseph Mahoney (1949 – 2019), known professionally as Eddie Money, American rock singer and songwriter
- Steven Pico, student who first brought on the case on banning books to the Supreme Court in Island Trees School District v. Pico.
- Marshall Avener, Marshall Scott Avener is an American gymnast. He was a member of the United States men's national artistic gymnastics team and competed at the 1972 Summer Olympics and the 1976 Summer Olympics
