= Marshall Avener =

American gymnast (born 1950)

- Full name: Marshall Scott Avener
- Born: December 10, 1950 (age 75) Brooklyn, New York, U.S.
- Height: 1.70 m (5 ft 7 in)
- Spouse: Judi Avener

Gymnastics career
- Discipline: Men's artistic gymnastics
- Country represented: United States
- College team: Penn State Nittany Lions (1971–1973)
- Club: Island Trees High School
- Head coach: Gene Wettstone
- Retired: c. 1976
Medal record
Men's artistic gymnastics
Representing United States
Event	1st	2nd	3rd
Pan American Games	1	0	1
Total	1	0	1
Pan American Games
Gold medal – first place	1975 Mexico City	Team
Bronze medal – third place	1975 Mexico City	Vault

Marshall Scott Avener (born December 10, 1950) is an American gymnast. He was a member of the United States men's national artistic gymnastics team and competed at the 1972 Summer Olympics and the 1976 Summer Olympics.

== Gymnastics career ==
=== Early career ===
Avener attended Island Trees High School in Levittown, New York, and represented the school in gymnastics competitions. Avener said that during his high school career, he had broken his toe while trying to impress the crowd.

Avener represented Pennsylvania State University where he was a speech major. He represented the USA at the 1970 World Artistic Gymnastics Championships in Ljubljana, SR Slovenia.

=== 1972 Summer Olympics ===
Avener was a US team member for the 1972 Olympics in Munich. He was selected after finishing 5th out of 11 candidates in a selection meet in Des Plaines, Illinois.

In Munich, Avener sometimes clashed with coaches and teammates. He irritated his team after choosing to get married on the third day of a six-week camp and demanding he and his wife be housed together. Avener was allegedly punched in the eye by teammate John Crosby Jr. after offending him.

After returning home from Munich, Avener visited a psychiatric clinic to control his ego and temper.

=== NCAA Champion ===
1973 was Avener's most successful collegiate season; he tied with Steve Hug to become the all-around champion at the NCAA Men's Gymnastics Championships held during April in Eugene, Oregon. A month later, Avener clinched the all-around title at a national level, crowned champion in the men's national competition that took place at Penn State Rec Hall.

Avener was unable to compete at the 1973 Summer Universiade due to injury.

=== 1975 Pan American Games ===
After graduating, Avener represented the USA at the 1975 Pan American Games, winning a bronze medal in the men's vault competition.

=== 1976 Summer Olympics ===
Avener represented the USA in gymnastics at the 1976 Summer Olympics. He was the only returning member of the US team from the Munich Olympics.

Individually, Avener competed in horizontal bar, floor exercise, horse vault, parallel bars, all-around, pommel horse, and rings. As part of the team all-around he helped the USA to a 7th place finish.

== Coaching career ==
Following the Munich Olympics, Avener became women's gymnastics coach at Penn State University. Avener left this coaching position after 1982 after it was alleged gymnasts felt he had mistreated them. In 2012, he was inducted into the US Gymnastics Hall of Fame.
