= Oliver La Farge =

American novelist and anthropologist (1901–1963)

- Born: Oliver Hazard Perry La Farge; December 19, 1901; New York City, U.S.
- Died: August 2, 1963 (aged 61); Santa Fe, New Mexico, U.S.
- Education: Harvard University (BA, MA)
- Occupations: novelist, anthropologist

Oliver Hazard Perry La Farge II (December 19, 1901 – August 2, 1963) was an American writer and anthropologist. In 1925, he surveyed many early Olmec sites in Mexico, and later studied additional sites in Central America and the American Southwest. He wrote more than 15 scholarly works on this topic, mostly about Native American cultures.

In addition, he wrote several novels, one of which, Laughing Boy (1929), won a Pulitzer Prize. La Farge also wrote short stories, published in such prominent magazines as The New Yorker and Esquire.

His more notable works, both fiction and non-fiction, emphasize Native American cultures. He was most familiar with the Navajo people and was fluent in their language. They gave him a Navajo name, 'Anast'harzi Nez', meaning "Tall Cliff-Dweller".

== Early life and education ==
Oliver La Farge was born in New York City but grew up in Newport, Rhode Island. He was the son of Christopher Grant La Farge, a noted Beaux-Arts architect, and Florence Bayard Lockwood. His older brother Christopher La Farge became a writer and was a novelist. La Farge and his paternal uncle, architect Oliver H.P. La Farge, were both named for their great-great-grandfather Oliver Hazard Perry.

La Farge received both his Bachelor of Arts degree (1924) and his master's degree (1929) from Harvard University.

== Career ==
La Farge worked as a writer and an anthropologist. In 1925, he traveled with the Danish archeologist Frans Blom, who taught at Tulane University, to what is now known as the Olmec heartland. He (re)discovered San Martin Pajapan Monument 1 and, more importantly, the ruins of La Venta, one of the major Olmec centers.

La Farge devoted considerable study to Native American peoples and issues, especially after moving to Santa Fe, New Mexico in 1933. He became a champion for American Indian rights and was president of the Association on American Indian Affairs for several years.

During World War II, La Farge served with the U.S. Air Transport Command, ending service with the rank of major. He participated in the Battle for Greenland, commanded by Colonel Bernt Balchen. Balchen, together with Corey Ford and La Farge, wrote War Below Zero: The Battle for Greenland (1944), about the actions to defend Greenland.

== Marriage and family ==
La Farge married heiress Wanden Matthews and had two children with her: a son, Oliver Albee La Farge (b. 1931, later known as Peter La Farge) and a daughter, Povy. They moved to Santa Fe in 1933, but Wanden disliked the area. The couple divorced in 1937.

Their first son, Oliver Albee, became estranged from his father and changed his name to Peter La Farge. He moved to New York City, where he became a well-known folksinger and songwriter in Greenwich Village. He performed mostly during the 1950s and 1960s. Some of his more successful songs have Native American themes, including "As Long as the Grass Shall Grow", which takes its name from the title of one of his father's books. It was about the Seneca people.

La Farge married a second time to Consuelo Otile Baca, with whom he had a son, John Pendaries "Pen" La Farge. La Farge's non-fiction book Behind the Mountains (1956) is based on his memories of Consuelo's family, the Baca family of New Mexico, who were ranchers in northern New Mexico.

La Farge also wrote a regular column for The New Mexican, a Santa Fe newspaper. Some of his columns were collected and published posthumously as The Man with the Calabash Pipe (1966).

La Farge died of heart failure in Santa Fe in 1963 at age 61.

== Legacy and honors ==
- Pulitzer Prize (1930) for fiction for Laughing Boy
- Building dedicated as the "Oliver La Farge" branch of the Santa Fe Public Library system

== Works ==
=== Non-fiction ===
- Tribes and Temples (with Frans Blom), 1926–1927
- The Year Bearer's People (with Douglas Byers), 1931
- Introduction to American Indian Art (with John Sloan), 1931
- An Alphabet for Writing the Navajo Language, 1940
- As Long As The Grass Can Grow – Indians Today, with photographs by Helen M. Post, 1940
- The Changing Indian (editor), 1942
- War Below Zero: The Battle for Greenland (Colonel Bernt Balchen, with Major Corey Ford), 1944
- Santa Eulalia: The Religion of a Cuchumatan Indian Town, 1947
- The Eagle in the Egg, 1949
- Cochise of Arizona, 1953
- The Mother Ditch, 1954
- A Pictorial History of the American Indian, 1956
- Behind the Mountains, 1956
- Santa Fe: The Autobiography of a Southwestern Town (with Arthur N. Morgan), 1959

=== Fiction and personal ===
- Laughing Boy (1929), novel, adapted for the 1934 motion picture of the same name
- Sparks Fly Upward (1931), novel
- Long Pennant (1933), novel
- All the Young Men (1935), collection of short stories
- The Enemy Gods (1937), novel
- The Copper Pot (1942), novel
- Raw Material (1945), a memoir
- A Pause in the Desert (1957), collection of short stories
- The Door in the Wall (1965), collection of short stories
- The Man With the Calabash Pipe (1966), collected columns, edited by Winfield Townley Scott

=== Translation ===
- A Man's Place (1940), translation of El lugar de un hombre, by Ramón J. Sender
