= Adam Wurtzel =

American television personality, host, reporter and producer

- Born: Adam Michael Wurtzel; Levittown, New York, U.S.
- Occupations: Television personality Television Producer
- Years active: 2003–present
- Website: http://adamwurtzel.com/

Adam Wurtzel is an American television personality, host and producer. He is best known for hosting the Syndicated TV series "Nashville Insider" as well as co-hosting the live stage game show, "Hollywood's Greatest Game Shows" with Bob Eubanks.

== Career ==
Wurtzel began his hosting career in college when he created and hosted Eastern Expedition at Eastern Connecticut State University. This show quickly gained attention when it won a BEA Award in Las Vegas for Best Student Production.

In 2009, Wurtzel was selected through a nationwide search to host the 3-hour Game Show Network live game show GSN Live. Already the Audience Warm-Up and Producer for CBS's The Early Show, this attention led Wurtzel to be named Backstage Correspondent for CBS's Early Backstage segments.

Wurtzel moved to Nashville with his wife, country music publicist Carly Caramanna in early 2012, where he began working for WSMV-TV in Nashville, covering both Better Nashville and News & More at Midday. He started his work on "Nashville Insider" in 2016 at the start of the show's run. Wurtzel is also an accomplished producer, having worked on major reality television shows such as Celebrity Apprentice, Kitchen Nightmares, America's Got Talent, and Jerseylicious.

Wurtzel is also a Segment Producer for ABC's Dick Clark's New Year's Rockin' Eve producing segments for co-hosts like Jenny McCarthy and Liza Koshy.

Since 2020, Wurtzel has been hosting the online YouTube talk show, Hosts at Home, which features virtual interviews with some of the greatest game show hosts.
