= Laughing Boy (film) =

1934 film by W. S. Van Dyke

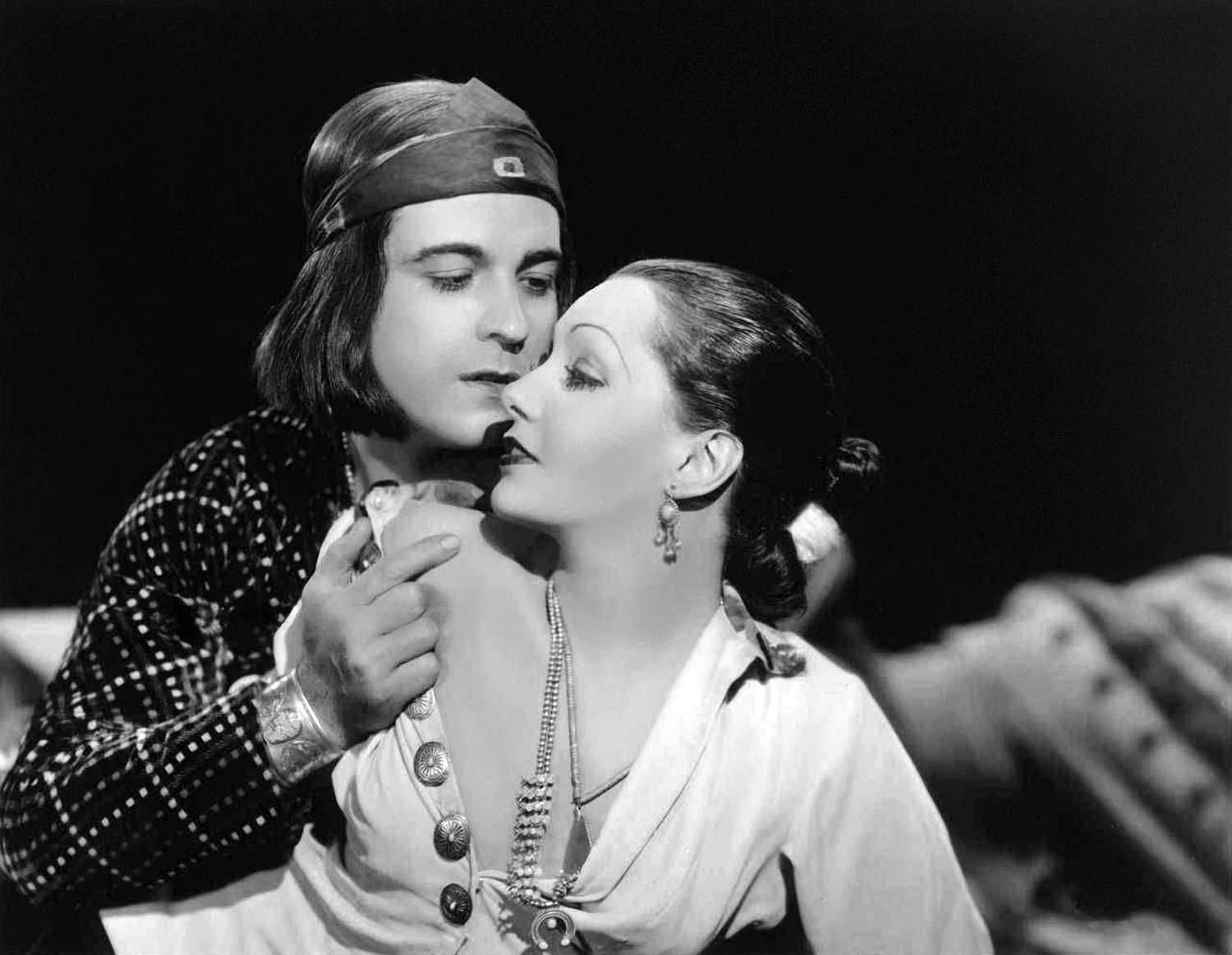
- Ramon Novarro and Lupe Vélez
- Directed by: W. S. Van Dyke
- Screenplay by: John Colton; John Lee Mahin
- Based on: Laughing Boy by Oliver La Farge
- Produced by: Hunt Stromberg; W. S. Van Dyke
- Starring: Ramón Novarro; Lupe Vélez
- Cinematography: Lester White
- Edited by: Blanche Sewell
- Music by: Herbert Stothart
- Distributed by: Metro-Goldwyn-Mayer
- Release date: April 13, 1934
- Running time: 79 minutes
- Country: United States
- Language: English

Laughing Boy is a 1934 pre-Code Western film directed by W.S. Van Dyke and is based on the 1929 Pulitzer Prize-winning novel of the same name by Oliver La Farge.

== Plot ==
Slim Girl is an Indian maiden raised by whites, who call her Lily. Many members of the Navajo tribe shun Slim Girl, believing her to be leading an improper life, perhaps even as a prostitute.

Laughing Boy, a silversmith, is seduced by her. After losing a horse race, he challenges rival Red Man to a wrestling match and wins. This impresses Slim Girl, who expresses her desire for him, and the two fall in love. Slim girl ends her intimate relationship with her 'sugar Daddy', George Hartshorne, a rich rancher, and agrees to marry Laughing Boy.

Due to being raised by whites, Slim girl does not assimilate into the Navajo ways well. She decides that to make the most of her talents, she should prostitute herself again, using the money she makes to buy sheep for their farm, while telling Laughing Boy that she is trading the silver products that he makes in town.

One day, when Slim Girl goes to town to sell his silver goods, Laughing Boy follows her and finds her in Hartshorne's arms. He fires an arrow at Hartshorne but ends up killing Slim Girl instead.

== Cast ==
Actor	Role
Ramón Novarro	Laughing Boy
Lupe Vélez	Slim Girl
William B. Davidson	George Hartshorne
Harlan Knight	Wounded Face

== Production ==
John Lee Mahin said MGM bought the rights to the play on his recommendation. Mahin claims the film was ruined by the casting of Ramon Navarro. "He looked like an old whore, with his hair hanging down and a blanket on." Mahin said "They should have had some virile young guy, Tyrone Power or somebody" although he liked Lupe Velez. "If you'd had somebody comparable to her and if you'd played the sad ending, you would have had a movie. It's very hard dialogue too. I don't know whether anybody could have played it. Their speeches were so up in the clouds. Oh, it was awful!"

== Reception ==
The film was a box-office disappointment for MGM.
