= Chapel of the Ascension =

Shrine in Jerusalem

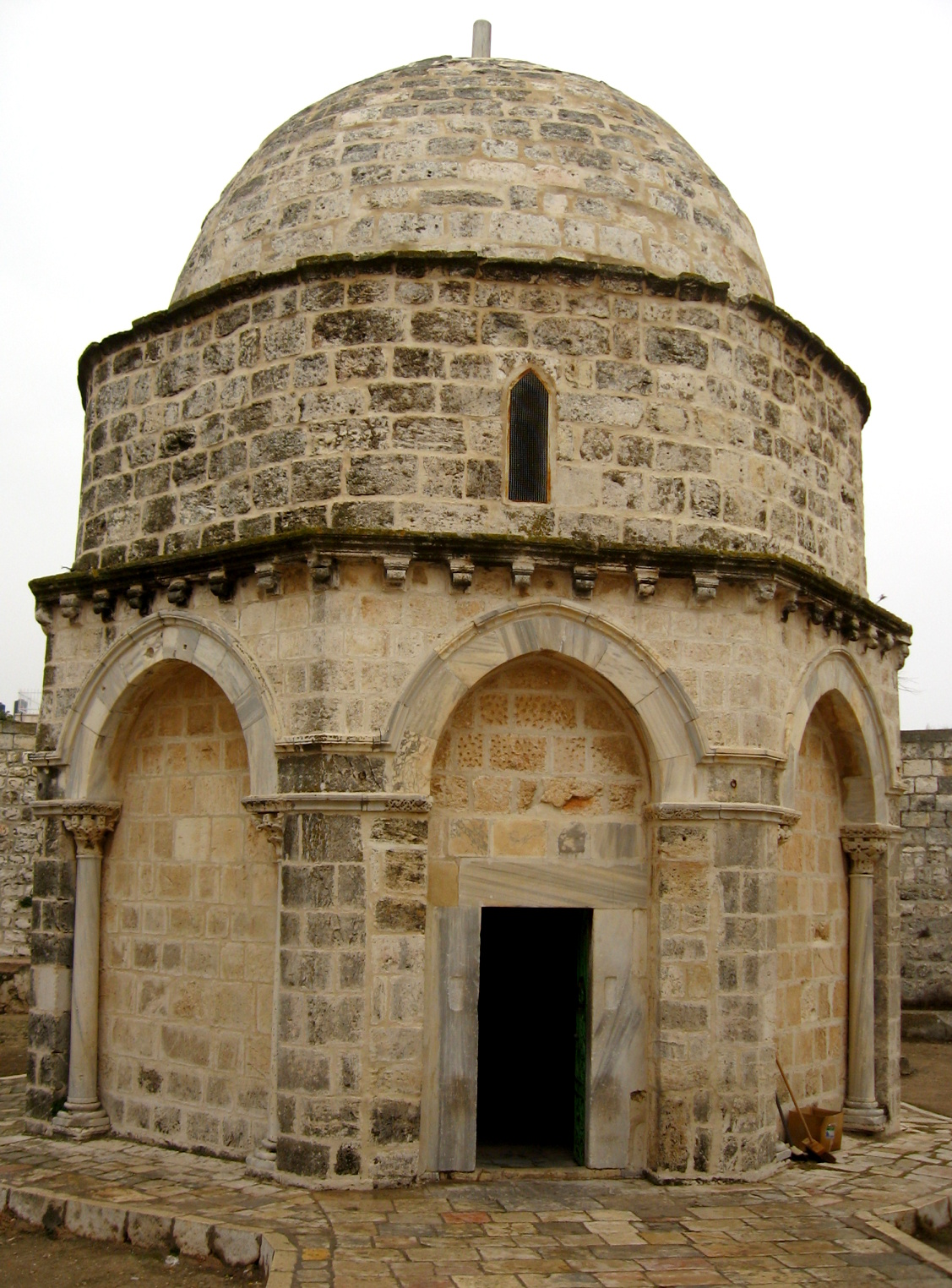
- The Ascension Ædicule

Religion
- Affiliation: Christian, Islamic
- District: At-Tur
- Ecclesiastical or organisational status: Under Islamic jurisdiction

Location
- Location: At-Tur, Mount of Olives, Jerusalem,Israel
- Interactive map of Chapel of the Ascension
- Coordinates: 31.7789°N 35.24505°E

Architecture
- Style: Romanesque
- Completed: First church c. 390; current chapel: c. 1150

The Chapel of the Ascension (Arabic: كنيسة الصعود, romanized: Kanīsat aṣ-ṣuʕūd; Greek: Εκκλησάκι της Αναλήψεως, Ekklisáki tis Analípseos; Hebrew: קפלת העלייה Qapelat ha-ʿAliyya) is a chapel and shrine located on the Mount of Olives, in the At-Tur district of Jerusalem. Part of a larger complex, historically it started as part of a Christian church and monastery, which later became an Islamic mosque, Zawiyat al-Adawiya ('the zawiya of [Rabia] al-Adawiya'), and is located on a site believed since the Byzantine period to be the earthly spot where Jesus ascended into Heaven after his Resurrection. It houses a slab of stone believed to contain one of his footprints. This article deals with two sites: the Christian site of the Ascension, and the adjacent but separate mosque built over an ancient grave.

== History ==
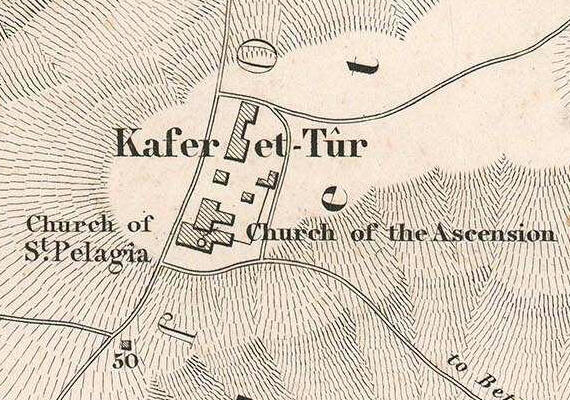
Chapel of the Ascension in the 1858 Van de Velde map of Jerusalem

Video with partially accurate presentation

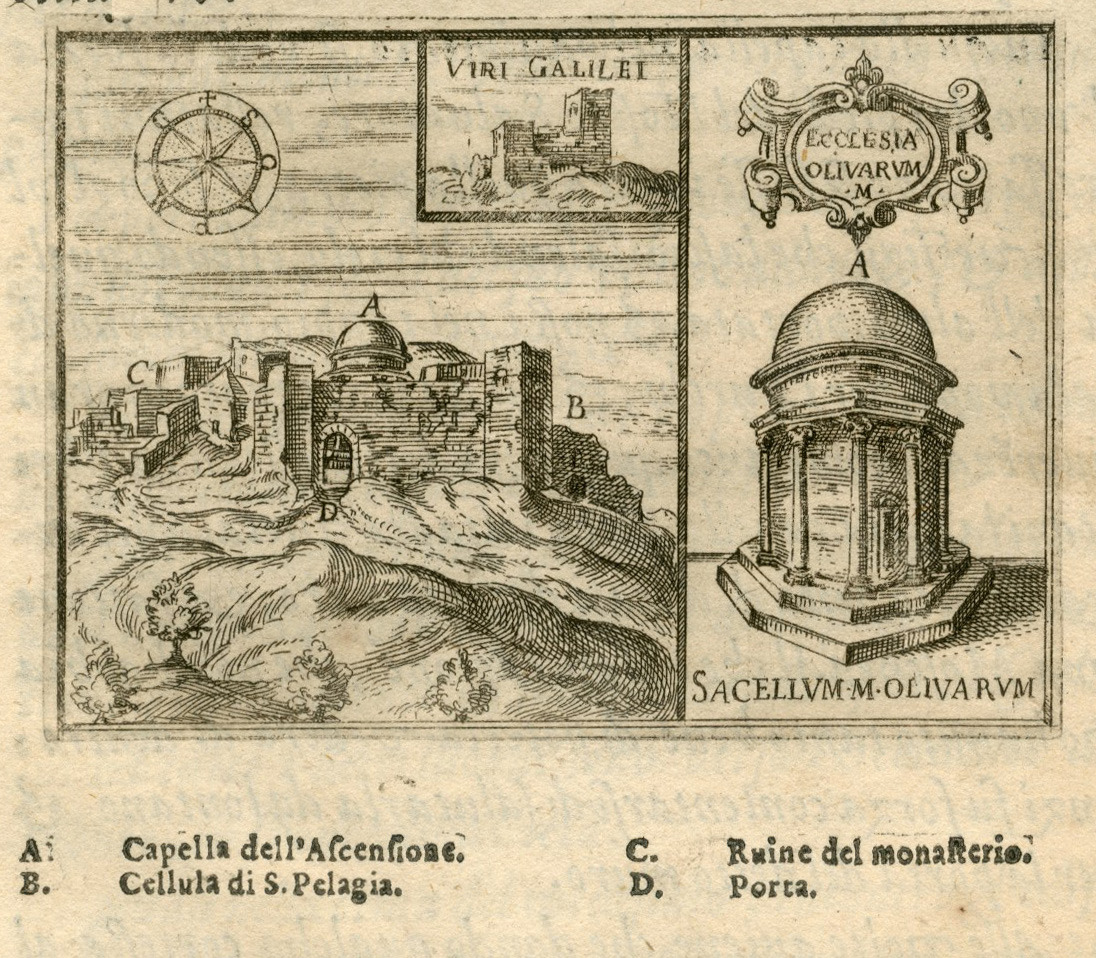
1587 sketch of the site

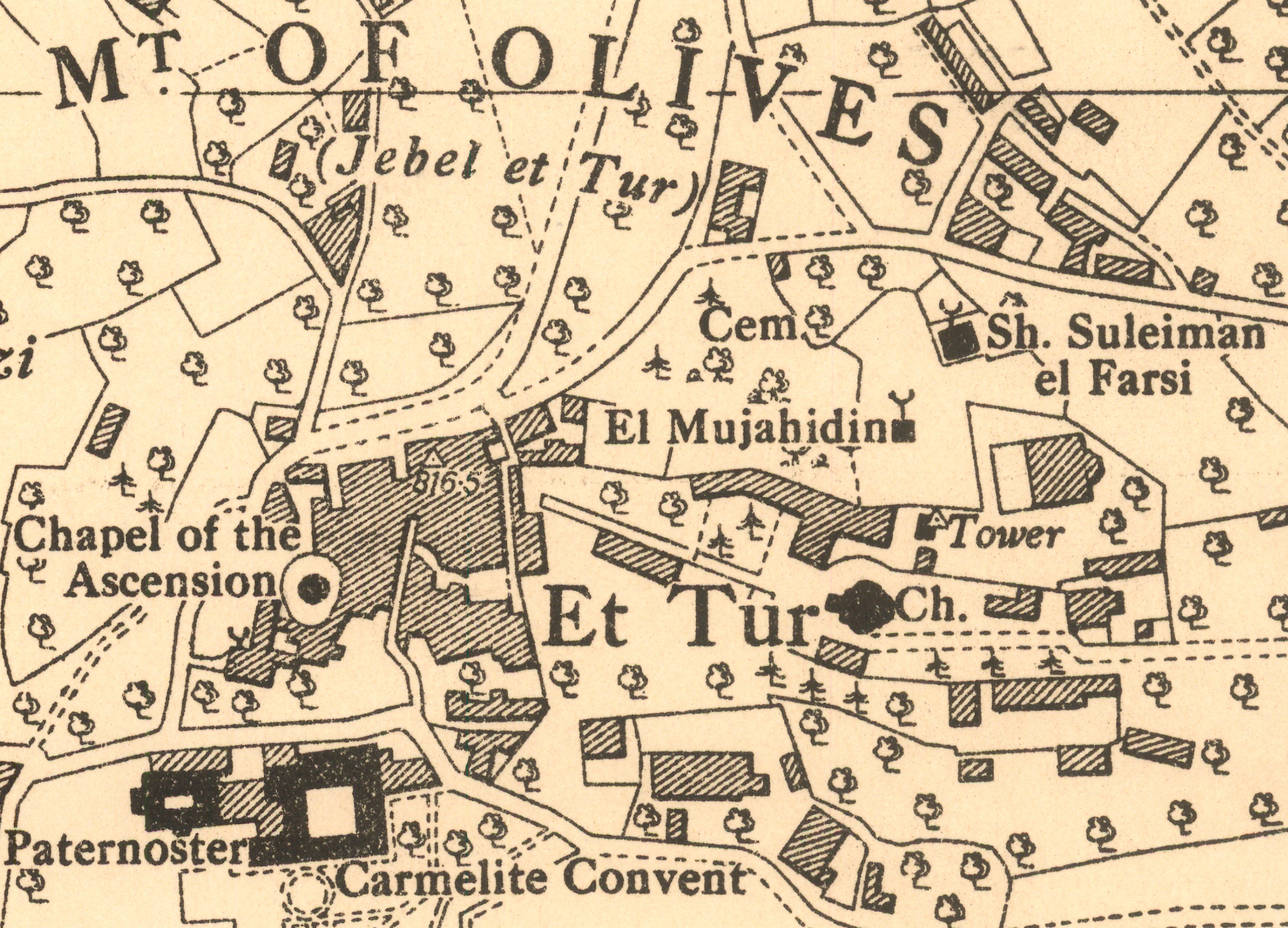
Peak of the Mount of Olives in the Survey of Palestine, 1938

=== First location of the Ascension ===
Almost 300 years after Jesus was said to have died, early Christians began gathering secretly in a small cave on the Mount of Olives. The issuance of the Edict of Milan by the Roman Emperors Constantine and Licinius in 313 made it possible for Christians to worship without government persecution.

=== Second location of the Ascension ===
By the time of the pilgrim Egeria's travels to Jerusalem in 384, the spot of veneration had been moved to the present location, so that Egeria witnessed the celebration of the Ascension at an "open hillock" uphill from the nearby cave; the cave itself had meanwhile been integrated into the Constantinian Church of Eleona.

=== 4th-century church (or churches) ===
The first church was erected there a few years later, sometime between AD 384–390, by Poimenia, a wealthy Roman aristocratic woman from the imperial family, who financed the building of the Byzantine-style church "around Christ's last footprints." The first complex constructed on the site of the present chapel was known as Imbomon (Greek for "on the hill"). It was a rotunda, open to the sky, surrounded by circular porticoes and arches.

The Imbomon, as well as the nearby Eleona Basilica and other monasteries and churches on the Mount of Olives, were destroyed by the armies of the Persian shah Khosrow II during the final phase of the Byzantine-Sassanid Wars in 614 (see Byzantine–Sasanian War of 602–628 and Sasanian conquest of Jerusalem).

There is a later popular legend, which falsely attributes the first Ascension Church at this site to Empress Helena, claiming that during her pilgrimage to the Holy Land between 326 and 328 she identified two spots on the Mount of Olives as being associated with Jesus' life—the place of his Ascension, and a grotto associated with his teaching of the Lord's Prayer—and on her return to Rome, she ordered the construction of two sanctuaries at these locations. Christian historian Socrates Scholasticus, writing over a century later, only mentions that "[Helena] built [a] church on the mountain of the Ascension."

=== 7th-century church ===
The church was rebuilt in the late 7th century. The Frankish bishop and pilgrim Arculf, in relating his pilgrimage to Jerusalem in about the year 680, described this church as "a round building open to the sky, with three porticoes entered from the south. Eight lamps shone brightly at night through windows facing Jerusalem. Inside was a central edicule containing the footprints of Christ, plainly and clearly impressed in the dust, inside a railing." Note that the footprints of Christ were "impressed in the dust", not stone.

=== 12th-century church ===
The reconstructed church was eventually destroyed, and rebuilt a second time by the Crusaders in the 12th century. The armies of Saladin later decimated the church, leaving only a partially intact outer 12-by-12-meter (40 ft × 40 ft) octagonal wall surrounding an inner 3-by-3-meter (10 ft × 10 ft) octagonal shrine, called a martyrium or edicule. This structure still stands today, although partially altered in the time after Saladin's 1187 conquest of Jerusalem.

=== Ayyubid repurposing; new adjacent mosque ===
After the fall of Jerusalem in 1187, the ruined church and monastery were abandoned by the Christians, who resettled in Acre. During this time, Saladin established the Mount of Olives as a waqf entrusted to two sheikhs, al-Salih Wali al-Din and Abu Hasan al-Hakari. This waqf was registered in a document dated 20 October 1188. The chapel was converted to a mosque, and a mihrab installed in it. Because the vast majority of pilgrims to the site were Christian, as a gesture of compromise and goodwill, Saladin ordered the construction of a second mosque nearby for Muslim worship while Christians continued to visit the main chapel.

=== 13th century till present time ===
Despite this act of accommodation by Saladin, tensions between Muslims and Christians in Jerusalem rose throughout the next 300 years. The shrine and surrounding structures saw periods of non-use and disrepair. By the 15th century, the destroyed eastern section was separated by a dividing wall and was no longer used for religious purposes.

Currently, the chapel is under the authority of the Islamic Waqf of Jerusalem and is open to visitors of all faiths, for a nominal fee.

=== Gallery ===
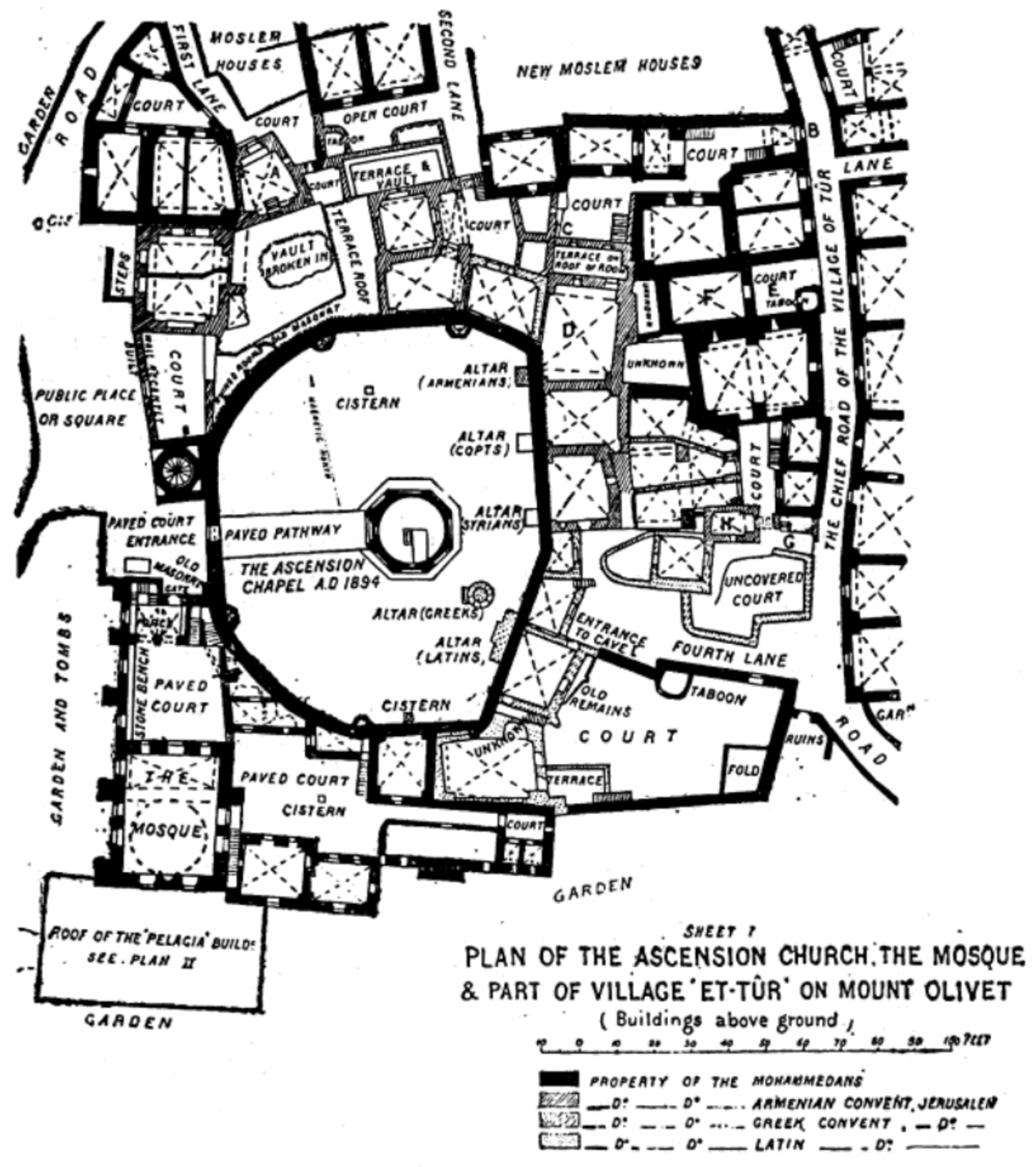
Plan of the Ascension Church, the Mosque & Part of Village ‘Et-Tûr’ on Mount Olivet

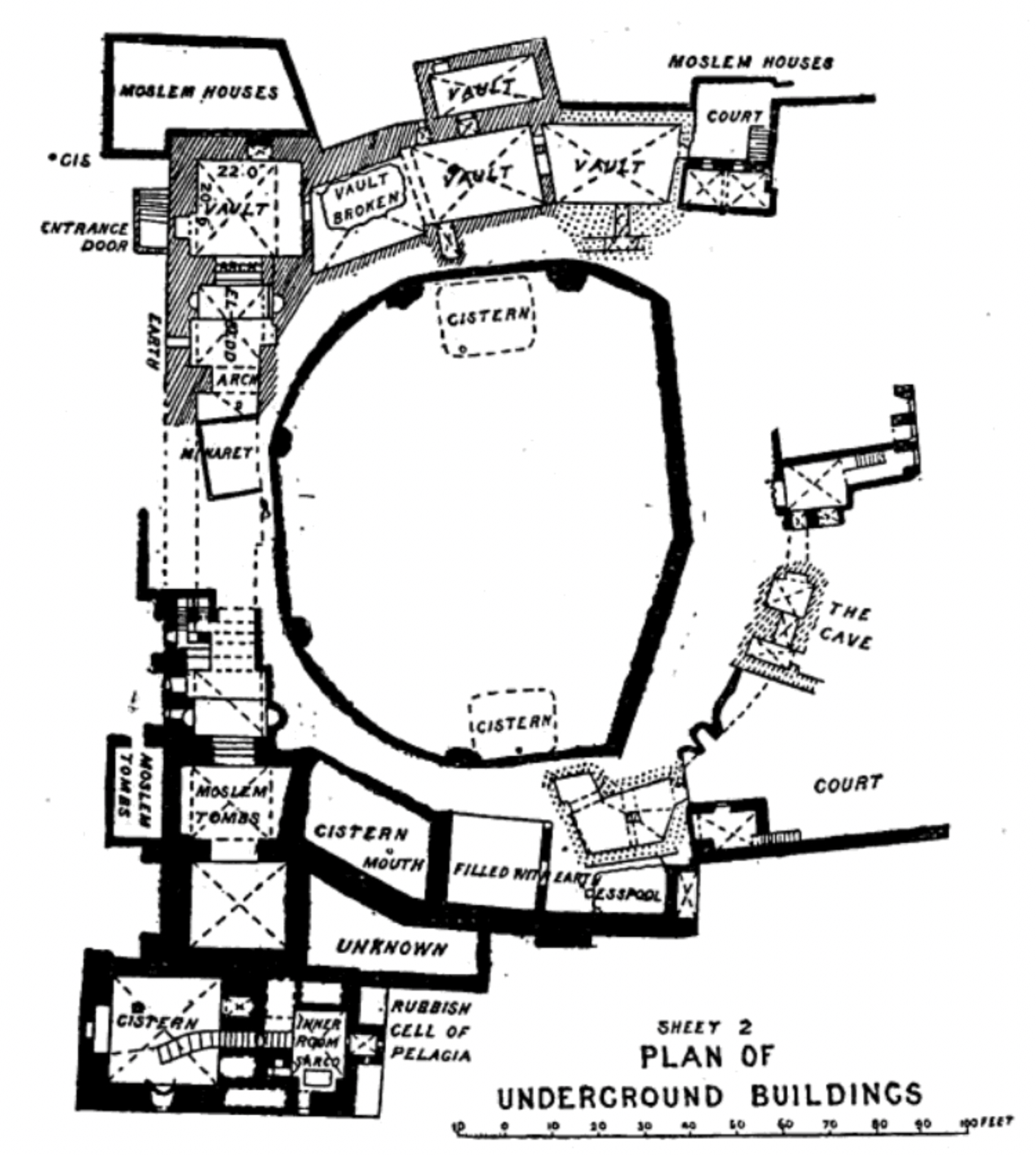
Plan of Underground Buildings

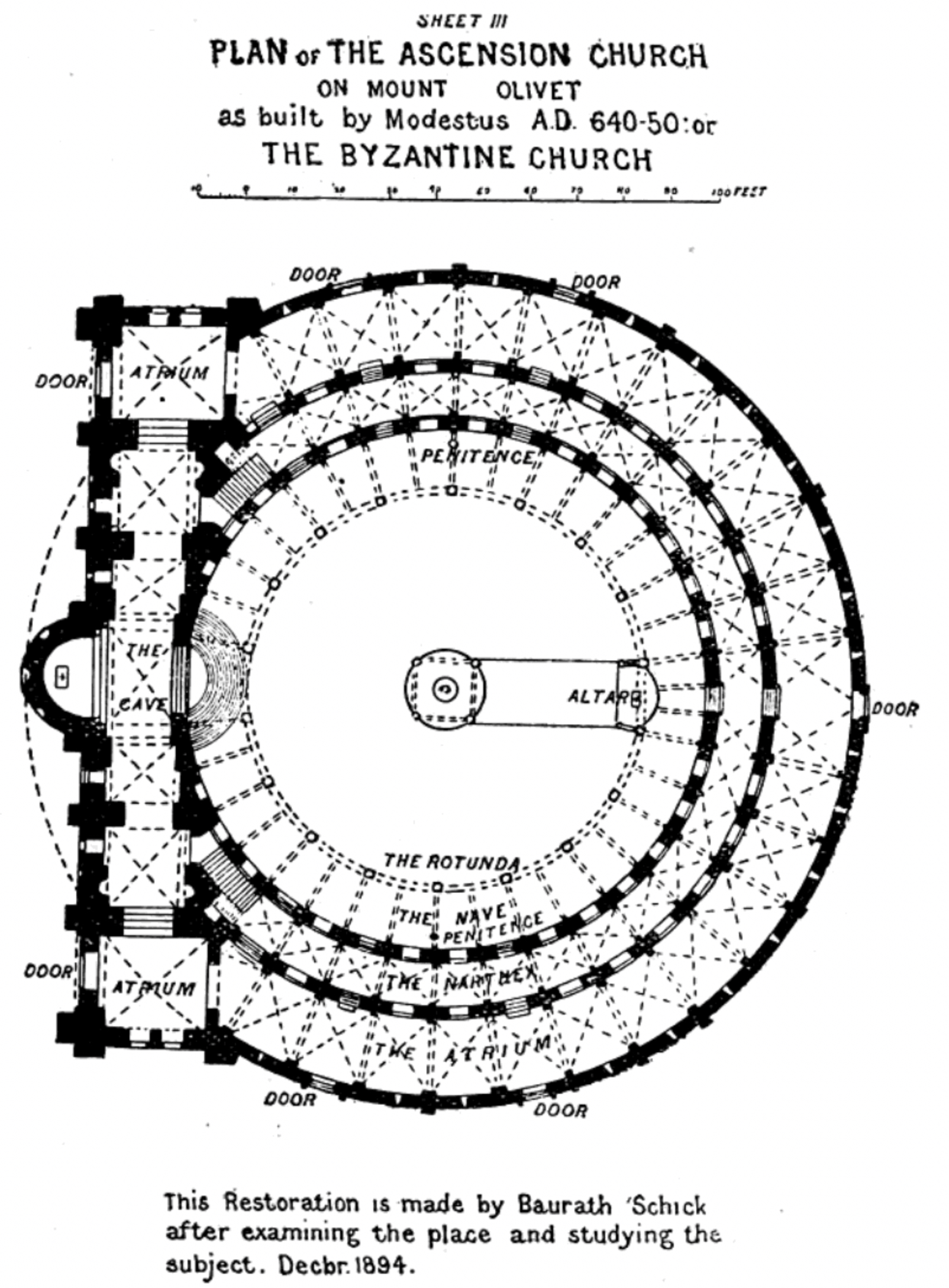
Plan of the Ascension Church on Mount Olivet (Byzantine Church as built by Modestus A.D. 640–50)

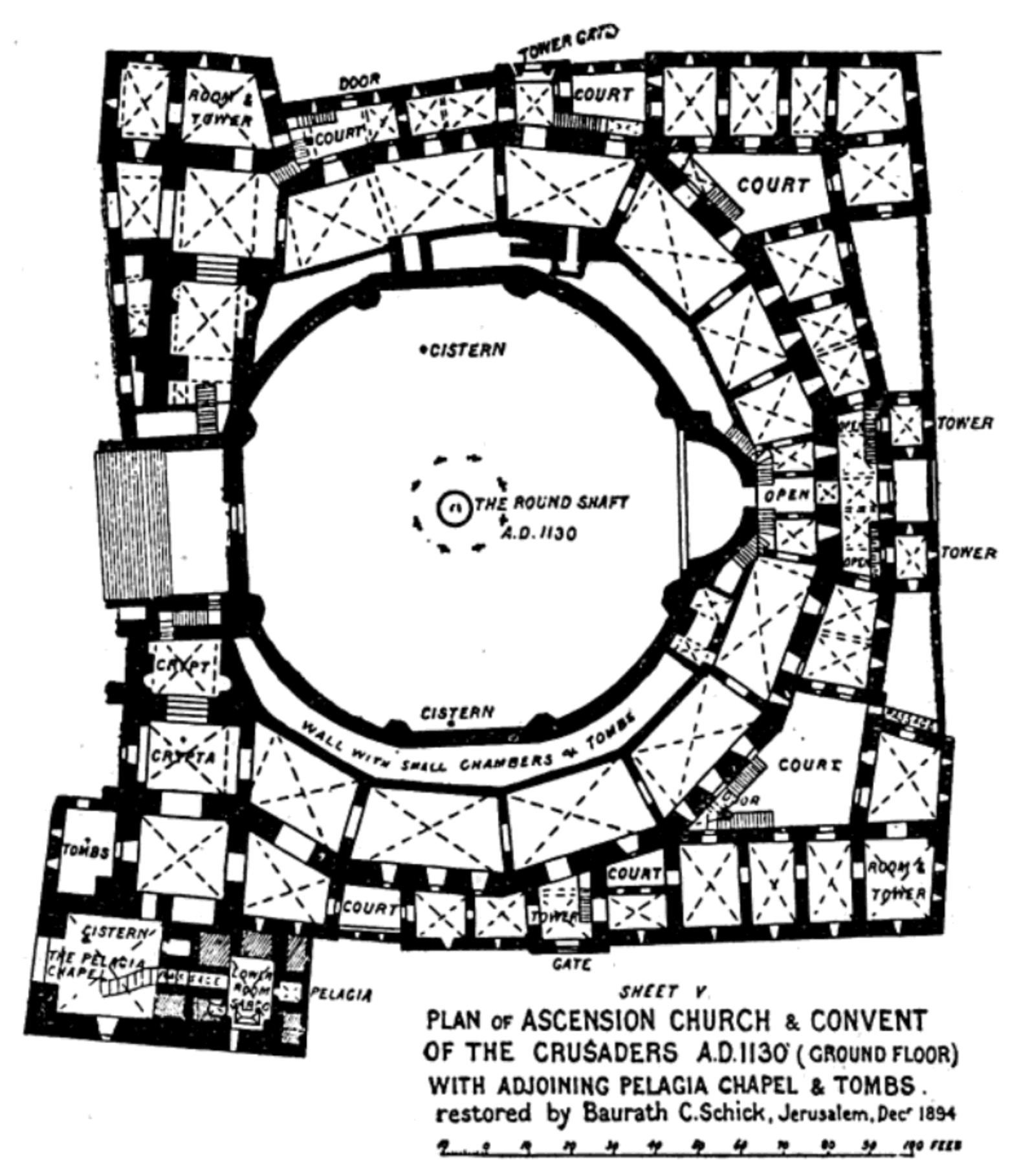
Plan of Ascension Church & Convent of the Crusaders A.D. 1130 (Ground Floor) with Adjoining Pelagia Chapel & Tomb

== Description of the chapel ==
=== Edicule (chapel) ===
The main structure of the chapel is from the Crusader era; the stone dome and the octagonal drum it stands on are Muslim additions, as are the exterior walls; only the arches and marble columns supporting them are part of the original Christian structure. The entrance faces west, and the south wall of the mosque/chapel consists of a mihrab indicating the direction of Mecca for Muslim worshippers.

=== "Ascension Rock" ===
The edicule surrounds a stone slab called the "Ascension Rock". It is said to contain the right footprint of Christ, while the section bearing the left footprint was taken to the Al-Aqsa Mosque in the Middle Ages. The faithful believe that the impression was made as Jesus ascended into Heaven and is venerated as the last point on earth touched by the incarnate Christ.

== Gallery ==
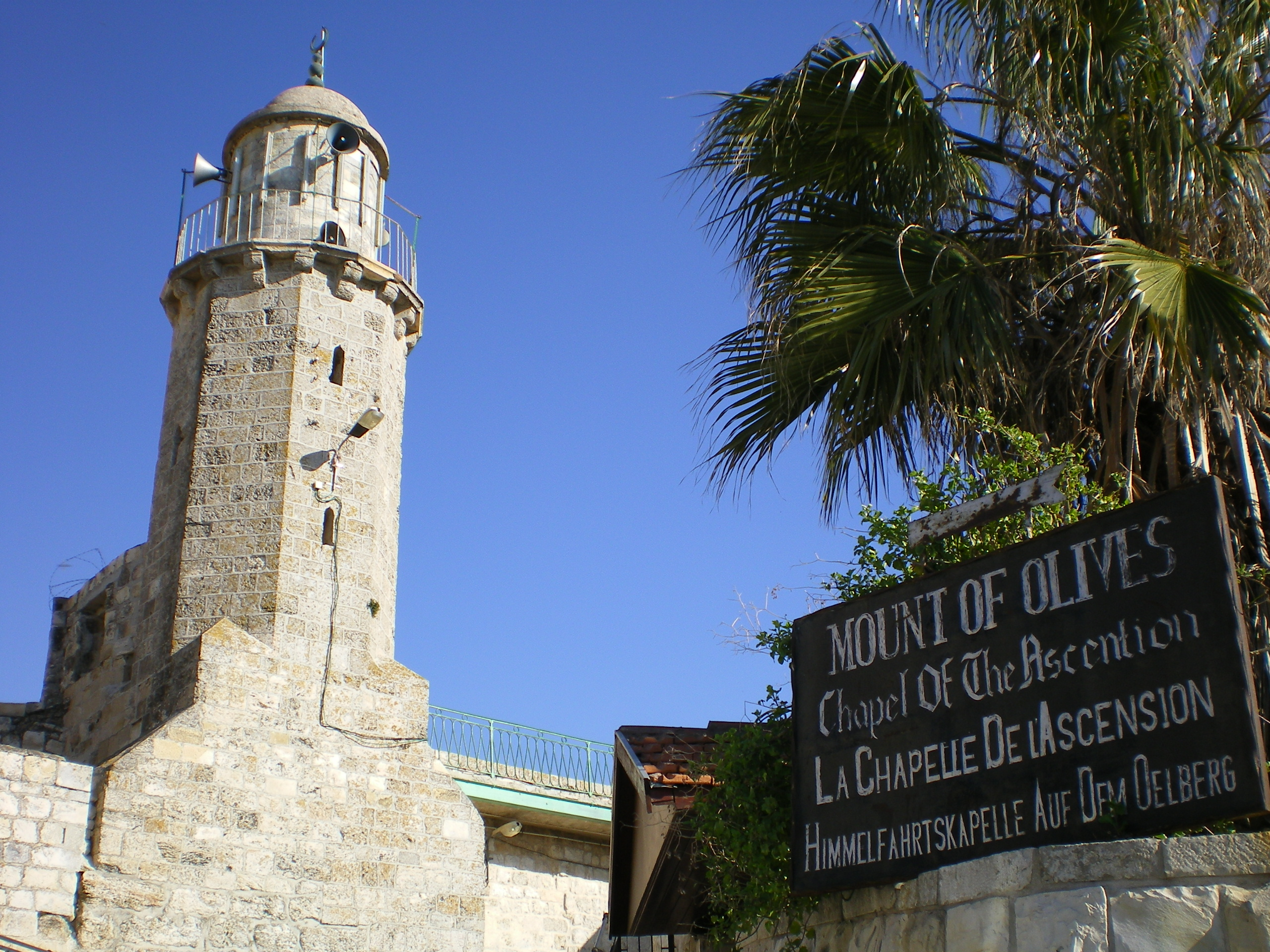
Minaret and outer wall

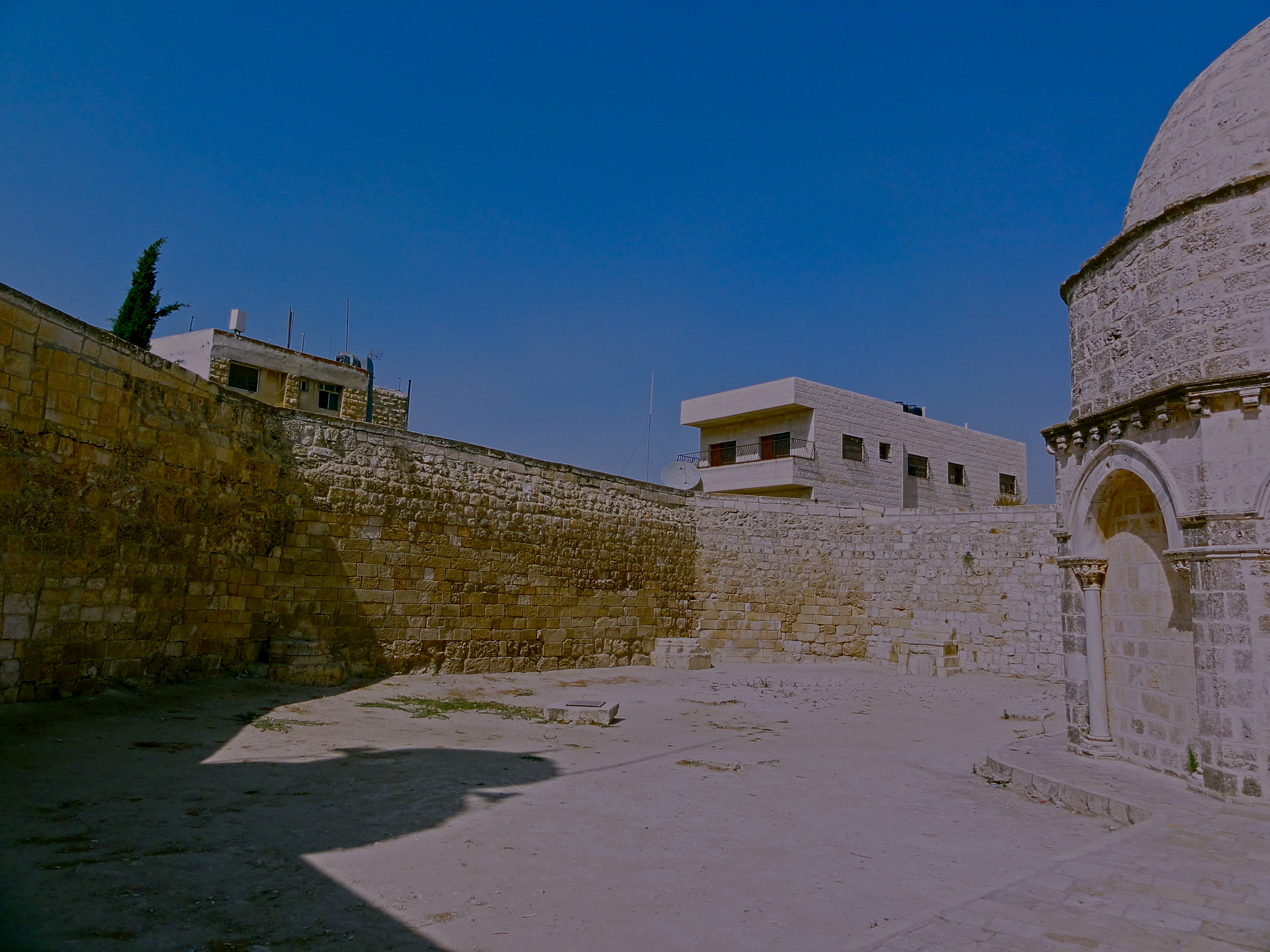
Chapel (right) and octagonal wall of ruined Crusader church

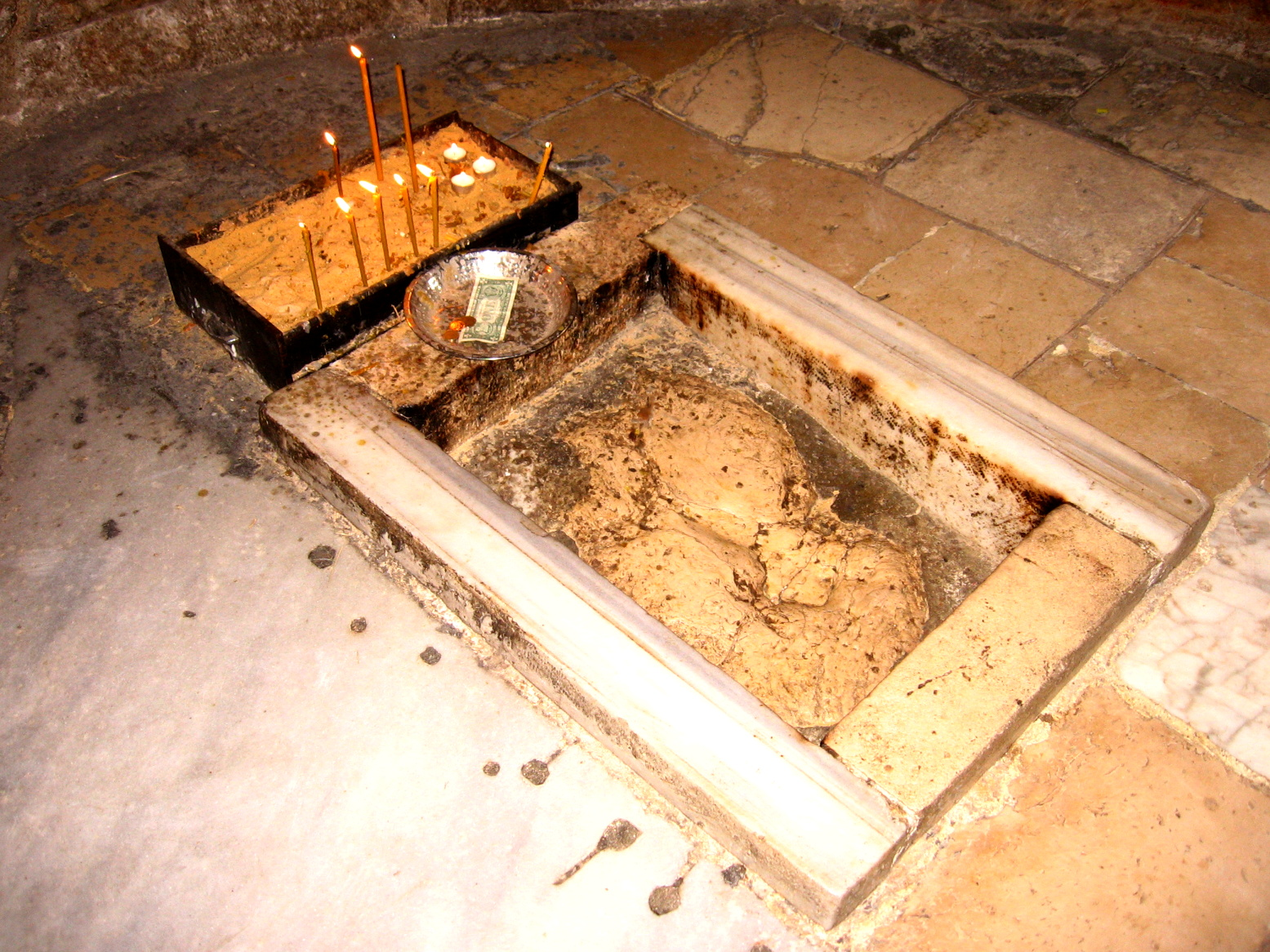
The Rock of the Ascension

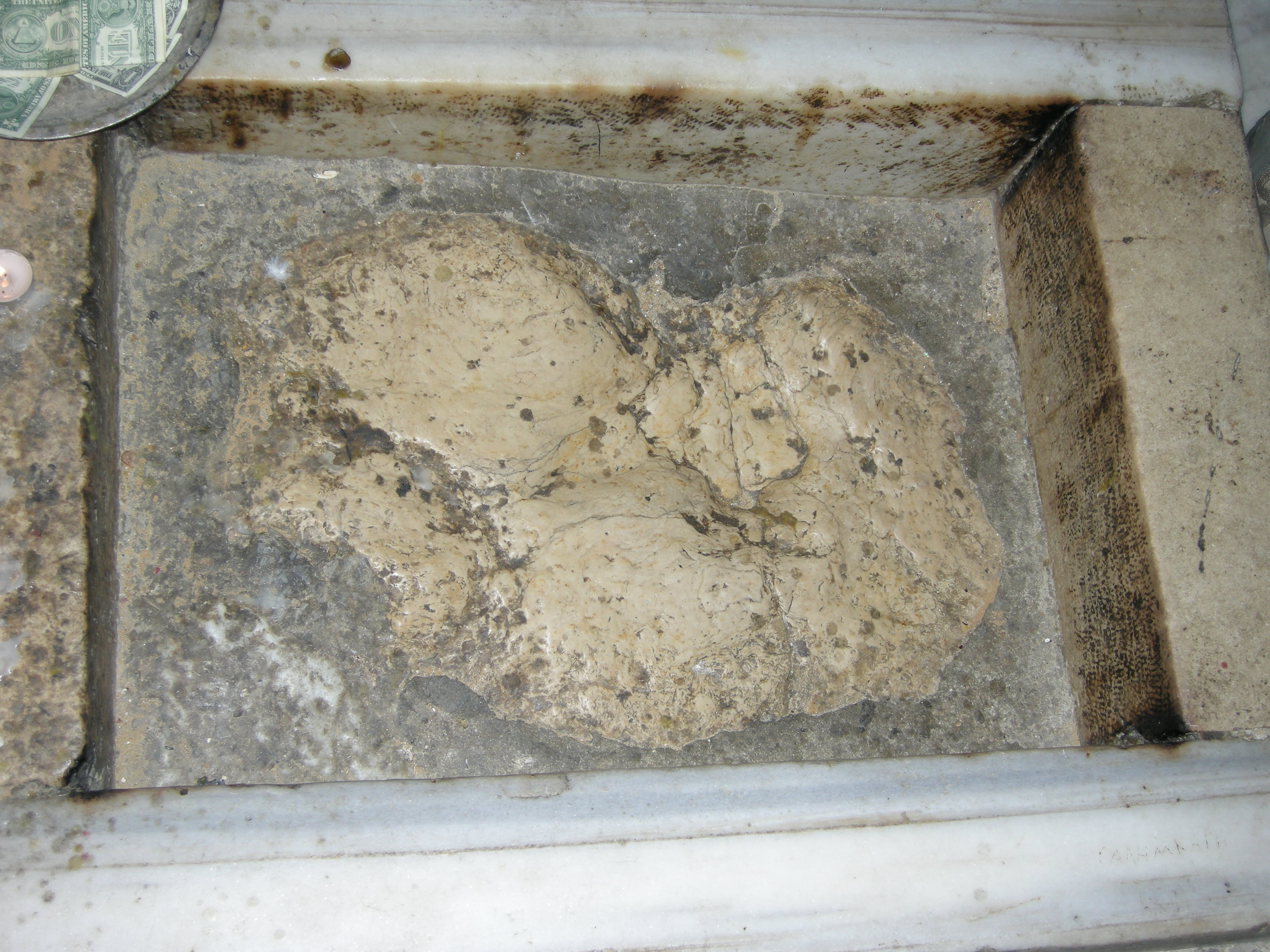
Close-up of the Rock of the Ascension

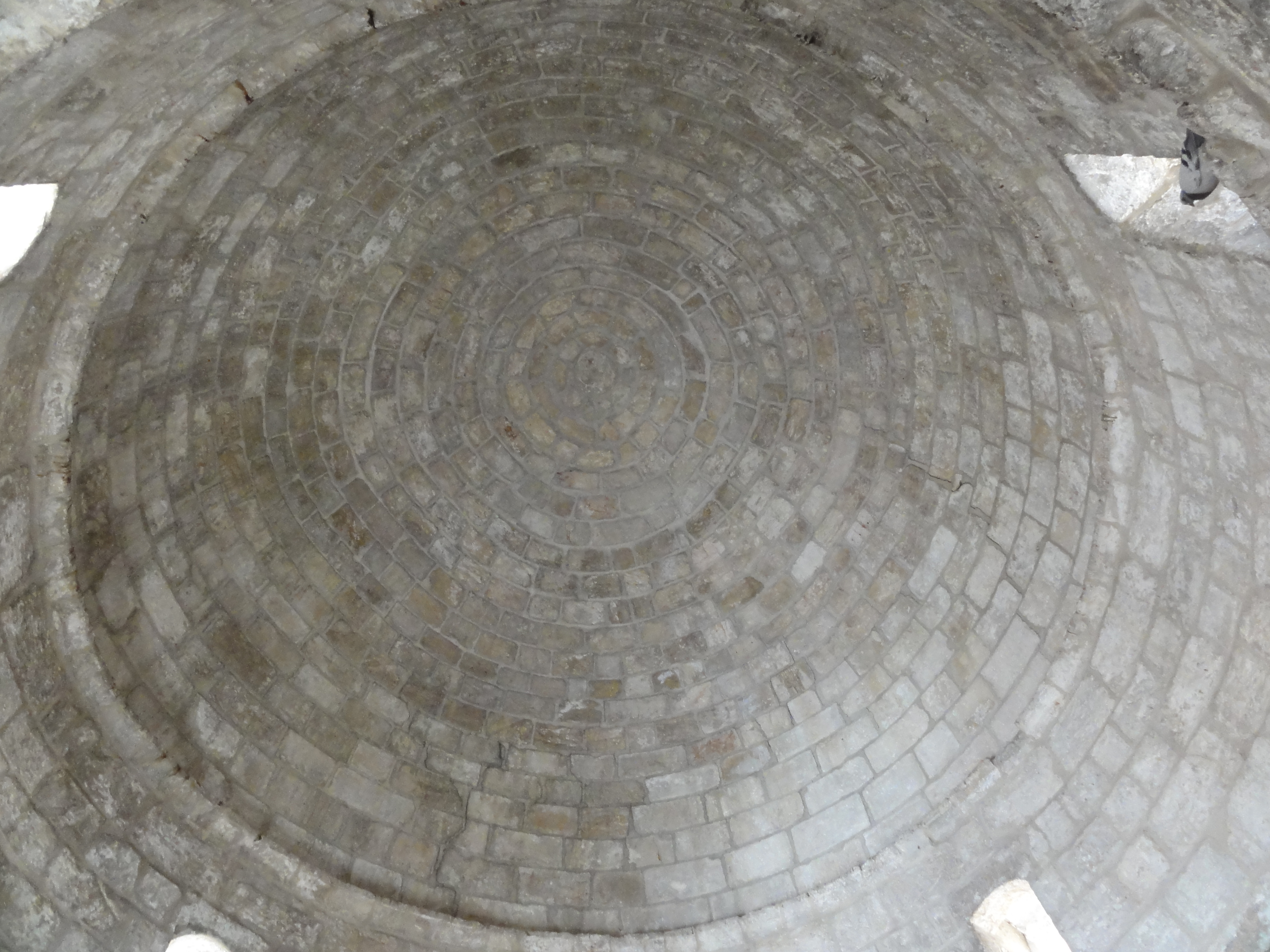
Chapel, the dome from inside

== Rabi'a Mosque and the Byzantine burial crypt ==
The mosque that stands southwest to the former Church of the Ascension, known as the zawiya of Rabi'a al-'Adawiyya, consists of two structures: the upper one, or the mosque proper, and an underground chamber.

=== The Byzantine crypt ===
The underground chamber is reached by a staircase, and includes a 2 m deep, 1.2 m wide, and 1.8 m high cell on its east side.

On the southern wall and near the tomb, a Greek funeral inscription of the Byzantine period mentioning the name Domitilla probably indicates who the tomb belonged to, even though the belief that it held the remains of Saint Pelagia is also attested from the Byzantine period.

Archaeologists Jon Seligman and Rafa Abu Raya, who carried out a short salvage excavation outside the southern wall of the mosque in 1995, have dated the underground chamber to the Byzantine period, identifying it as the burial crypt of a chapel that was part of the Church of the Ascension. The crypt is situated east of the mosque, and lies opposite of the entrance. To the right of the entrance, the cenotaph or sarcophagus stands within a niche.

Each of the three Abrahamic religions attributes the tomb to a different female holy figure.

==== Christian tradition ====
The Christian tradition of Saint Pelagia is the oldest. "The Life of Saint Pelagia the Harlot", the vita of a legendary 4th- or 5th-century Christian hermit and penitent, also known as Saint Pelagia of Antioch, states that she "built herself a cell on the Mount of Olives." There she lived a holy life disguised as a monk and "wrought...many wonders." She died few years later due to her severe asceticism, "and the holy fathers bore her body to its burial." Christian tradition places her cell and tomb at the site of the zawiya, adjacent and to the southwest of the former Church of the Ascension.

However, most Western Christian pilgrims of the 14th century venerated the tomb as that of Saint Mary the Egyptian, although the Pelagia tradition also lives on.

==== Jewish tradition ====
The Jewish tradition attributing the tomb to the prophetess Huldah is recorded from 1322 onwards, starting with Estori Ha-Parhi. Another tradition exists starting with the 2nd-century Tosefta, which places the tomb of Huldah within Jerusalem's city walls.

==== Muslim tradition ====
Maqdisi's mid-14th-century counter-crusade propaganda work Muthir al-gharam fi ziyarat al-Quds wa-sh-Sham ("Arousing love for visiting Jerusalem and Syria"; c. 1350–51) places the death year of Rabi'a al-'Adawiyya around 781/82 and has her buried in this burial crypt. Other historians, such as al-Harawi (d. 1215) and Yaqut (1179–1229) locate Rabi'a's grave in her hometown of Basra, and attribute the Mount of Olives tomb to another Rabi'a, wife of a Sufi, Ahmad Ibn Abu el Huari, from the late Crusader and early Ayyubid period. Yet another Muslim tradition attributes the grave to Rahiba bint Hasn, a woman of whom nothing is known.

=== The medieval mosque (upper structure) ===
Seligman and Abu Raya date the upper building to the medieval period, and hold an Ayyubid date to be the most likely. However, Denys Pringle suggests a Crusader date, based on features such as the western entrance which could indicate an east–west orientation of the structure, and the fact that the mihrab is set into an older window niche.

== Environs ==
Across the street from the chapel is the Greek Orthodox Monastery of the Ascension with a small church built between 1987 and 1992.

South of the Ascension Chapel and slightly downhill is the monastery containing the remains of the Constantinian Eleona Church and the 19th-century Church of the Pater Noster.

The Russian Orthodox Convent of the Ascension, built in 1870, is located about 200 meters northeast of the chapel. It now houses about 40 nuns. Across the street stands the Muslim Makassed Hospital.

Further away to the northeast is the German Protestant Ascension Church, part of the Augusta Victoria compound.

== Bibliography ==
- Pringle, Denys (2007). The Churches of the Crusader Kingdom of Jerusalem: A Corpus. Vol. III, The City of Jerusalem. New York: Cambridge University Press. ISBN 978-0-521-39038-5.
  - "Cave Chapel of Saint Pelagia (no. 351)", pp. 342–346 [see 344 ].
  - "Church of the Ascension, or the Saviour, in the Abbey of the Mount of Olives (no. 284)", pp. 72–88.
