= At-Tur, East Jerusalem =

Palestinian neighborhood in East Jerusalem

Coordinates: 31°46′49″N 35°14′47″E

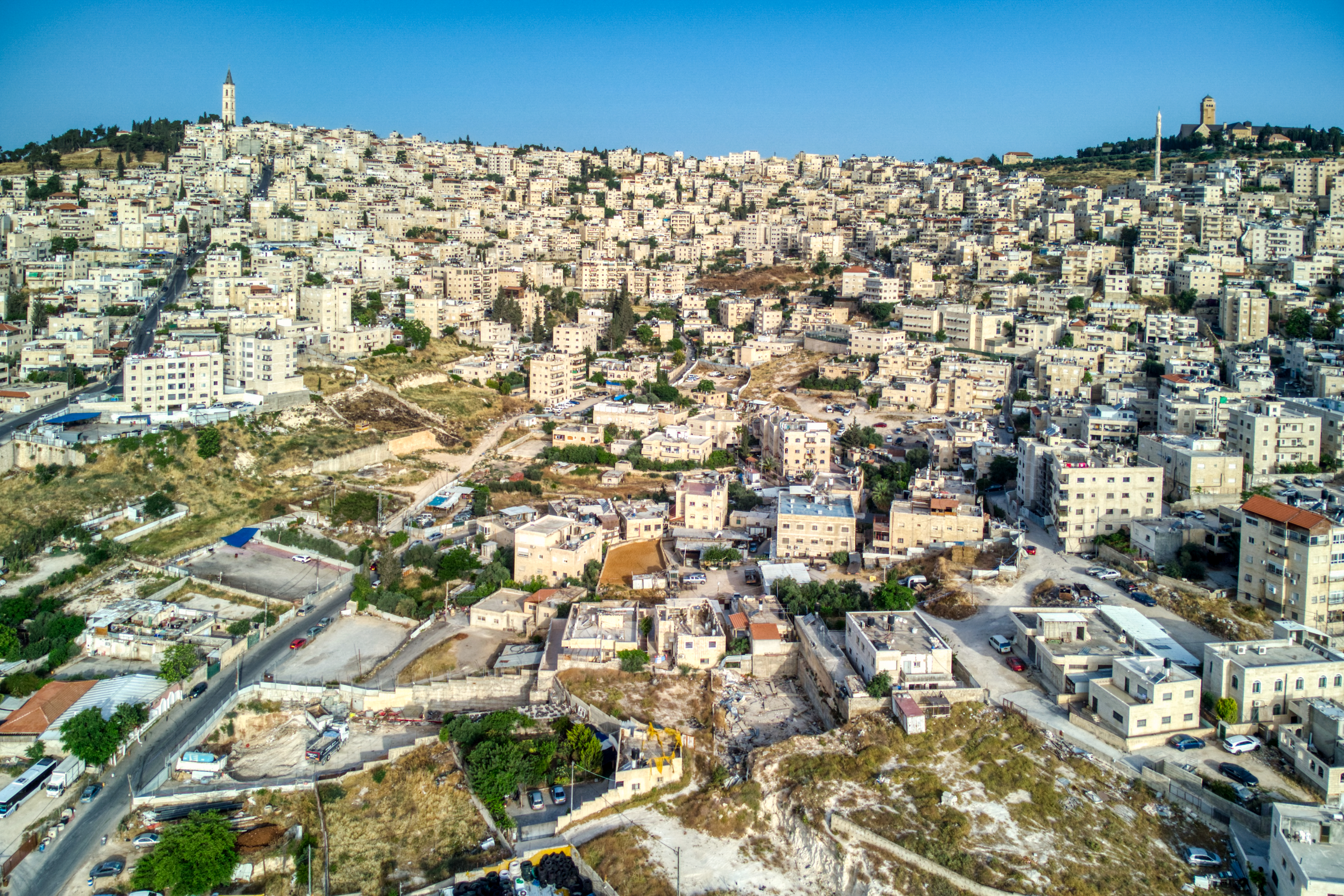
At-Tur

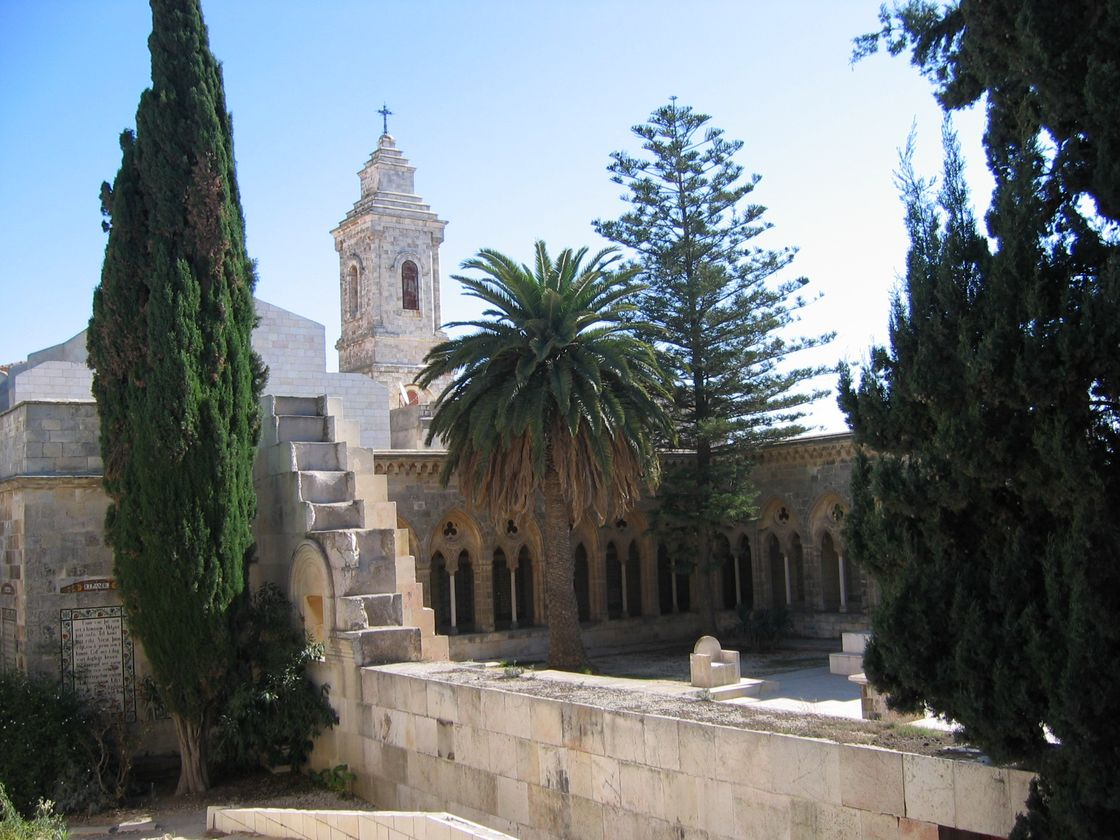
Church of the Pater Noster in At-Tur

At-Tur (Arabic: الطور, romanized: aṭ-Ṭūr, lit. 'the Mount'; Hebrew: א-טור) is a neighborhood on the Mount of Olives approximately 1 km east of the Old City of Jerusalem. At-Tur is situated in East Jerusalem, occupied by Israel after the Six-Day War in 1967.

== History ==
At-Tur is believed to be the location of the site of Bethphage (Ancient Greek: Βηθφαγή; Imperial Aramaic: בֵּית פַּגִּי, lit. 'house of unripe figs'), a place mentioned in the New Testament. Archaeological excavations uncovered rock-cut installations, a quarry, columbarium, and rock-cut caves. Also found at the site are burial caves believed to date from the Second Temple period.

=== Ottoman Empire ===
In 1596, the village appeared as Tur Zayta in Ottoman tax registers as being in the Nahiya of Quds of the Liwa of Quds. It had a population of 48 households and 8 bachelors, all Muslim, and paid taxes on wheat, barley, vines or fruit trees, and goats or beehives, a total of 3,200 akçe.

In 1838, in the Biblical Researches in Palestine, it was noted as a Muslim village, located in el-Wadiyeh district, east of Jerusalem.

An Ottoman village list of about 1870 counted 38 houses and a population of 127, though the population count included only men. It was described as a village on the Mount of Olives.

In 1883, the Palestine Exploration Fund's Survey of Western Palestine (SWP) described At-Tur as "a small straggling village on the top of Olivet. The houses are built of stone, but low and mean. The church of the Ascension, now a mosque, stands towards the west at the brow of the hill."

In 1896 the population of Et-tur was estimated to be about 474 persons.

=== British Mandate ===
In the 1922 census of Palestine conducted by the British Mandate authorities, At Tur had a population 1,037; 806 Muslims and 231 Christians, increasing in the 1931 census to 2,090; 12 Jews, 253 Christians and 1,825 Muslims, in 400 houses.

In the 1945 statistics the population of Et Tur was 2,770; 2,380 Muslims and 390 Christians, who owned 8,808 dunams of land according to an official land and population survey. 228 dunams were plantations and irrigable land, 2,838 for cereals, while 86 dunams were built-up (urban) land.

=== Jordan ===
After the 1948 Arab-Israeli War, At-Tur came under Jordanian rule.

The Jordanian census of 1961 found 4,289 inhabitants in At-Tur, of whom 686 were Christian.

=== Israel ===
During the 1967 Six-Day War, At-Tur came under Israeli occupation, remaining so after the war.

In 2024, At-Tur had a population of 18,150, mostly Muslims, with a small Christian minority and a few dozen families of Israeli Jews. Jewish Israelis have been buying properties in the neighbourhood and have been resettling the Mount of Olives at a growing rate.

On Friday, 24 April 2015, a 16-year-old resident of at-Tur was shot dead by Israeli soldiers at the Az-Zaim checkpoint. The police said he attacked with a knife, but his family denied this.

== Landmarks ==
The Chapel of the Ascension is located in At-Tur. Located on the Mount of Olives, the chapel is part of a larger complex consisting first of a Christian church and monastery, then an Islamic mosque. It is located on a site which the Christian faithful traditionally believe to be the earthly spot where Jesus ascended into Heaven forty days after his resurrection.

Landmarks in At-Tur include the Augusta Victoria Hospital, the Church and Convent of Pater Noster, where the Lord's Prayer is inscribed in 110 languages, and the Seven Arches Hotel.

The Al-Makassed Islamic Charitable Hospital, a 250-bed medical facility with in-patient and out-patient services is located in At-Tur.

== See also ==
- Status of Jerusalem

== Bibliography ==
- Barron, J.B., ed. (1923). Palestine: Report and General Abstracts of the Census of 1922. Government of Palestine.
- Conder, C.R.; Kitchener, H.H. (1883). The Survey of Western Palestine: Memoirs of the Topography, Orography, Hydrography, and Archaeology. Vol. 3. London: Committee of the Palestine Exploration Fund.
- Government of Jordan, Department of Statistics (1964). First Census of Population and Housing. Volume I: Final Tables; General Characteristics of the Population (PDF).
- Government of Palestine, Department of Statistics (1945). Village Statistics, April, 1945.
- Hadawi, S. (1970). Village Statistics of 1945: A Classification of Land and Area ownership in Palestine. Palestine Liberation Organization Research Center.
- Hartmann, M. (1883). "Die Ortschaftenliste des Liwa Jerusalem in dem türkischen Staatskalender für Syrien auf das Jahr 1288 der Flucht (1871)". Zeitschrift des Deutschen Palästina-Vereins. 6: 102–149.
- Hütteroth, W.-D.; Abdulfattah, K. (1977). Historical Geography of Palestine, Transjordan and Southern Syria in the Late 16th Century. Erlanger Geographische Arbeiten, Sonderband 5. Erlangen, Germany: Vorstand der Fränkischen Geographischen Gesellschaft. ISBN 3-920405-41-2.
- Mills, E., ed. (1932). Census of Palestine 1931. Population of Villages, Towns and Administrative Areas. Jerusalem: Government of Palestine.
- Palmer, E.H. (1881). The Survey of Western Palestine: Arabic and English Name Lists Collected During the Survey by Lieutenants Conder and Kitchener, R. E. Transliterated and Explained by E.H. Palmer. Committee of the Palestine Exploration Fund.
- Robinson, E.; Smith, E. (1841). Biblical Researches in Palestine, Mount Sinai and Arabia Petraea: A Journal of Travels in the year 1838. Vol. 1. Boston: Crocker & Brewster.
- Robinson, E.; Smith, E. (1841). Biblical Researches in Palestine, Mount Sinai and Arabia Petraea: A Journal of Travels in the year 1838. Vol. 3. Boston: Crocker & Brewster.
- Schick, C. (1896). "Zur Einwohnerzahl des Bezirks Jerusalem". Zeitschrift des Deutschen Palästina-Vereins. 19: 120–127.
- Socin, A. (1879). "Alphabetisches Verzeichniss von Ortschaften des Paschalik Jerusalem". Zeitschrift des Deutschen Palästina-Vereins. 2: 135–163.
