= Seven Arches Hotel =

Hotel in Jerusalem

Hotel 7 Arches Jerusalem
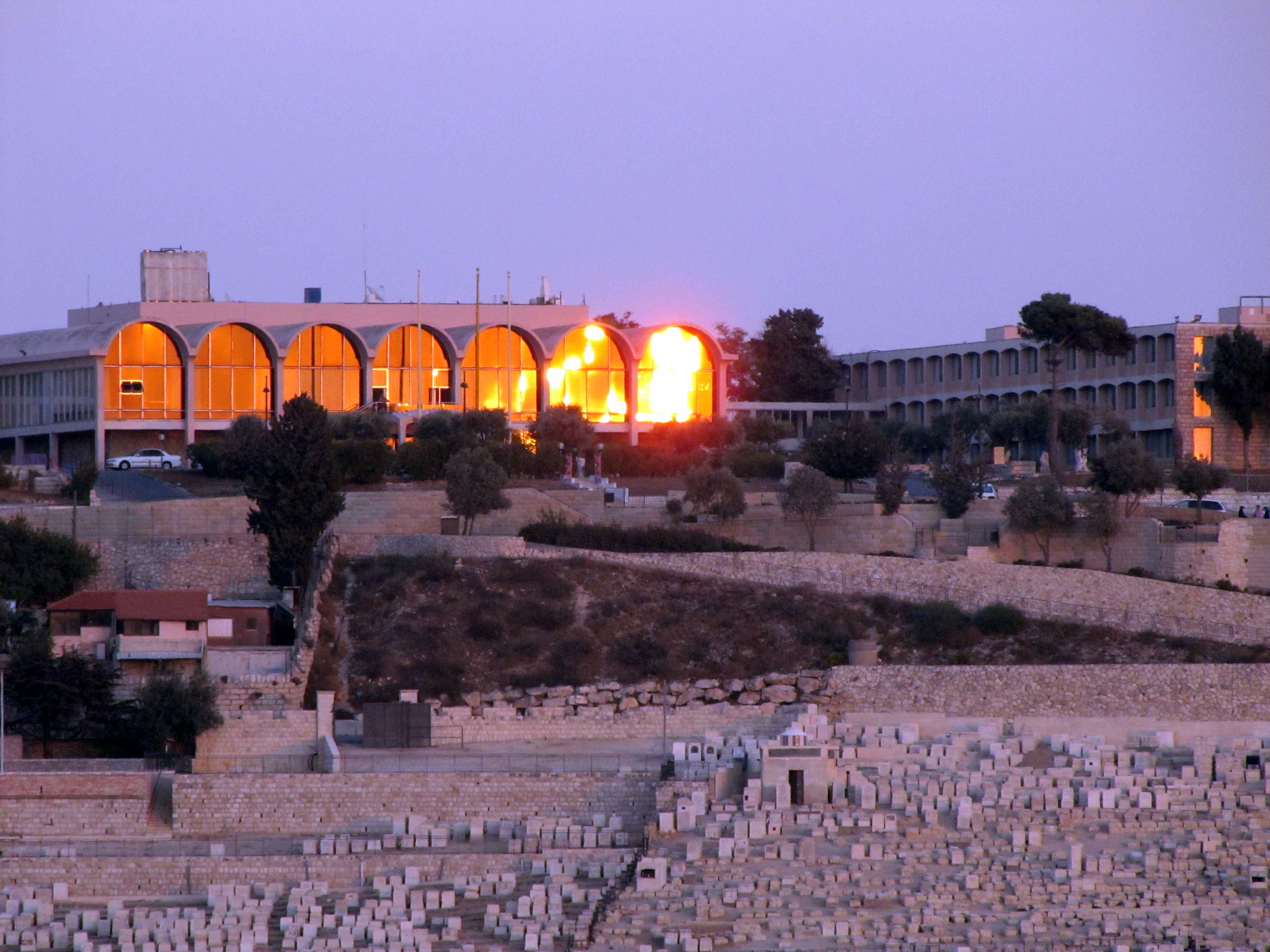
- Interactive map of the Hotel 7 Arches Jerusalem area

General information
- Location: Mount of Olives, Jerusalem
- Coordinates: 31.77555°N 35.24333°E
- Opening: March 20, 1964
- Owner: Jordanian government (originally)

Technical details
- Floor count: 3

Design and construction
- Architect: William B. Tabler

Other information
- Number of rooms: 196
- Number of restaurants: 1

The Hotel 7 Arches Jerusalem is a hotel in East Jerusalem in the Arab neighborhood of at-Tur on the Mount of Olives. The hotel overlooks the old city of Jerusalem.

== History ==
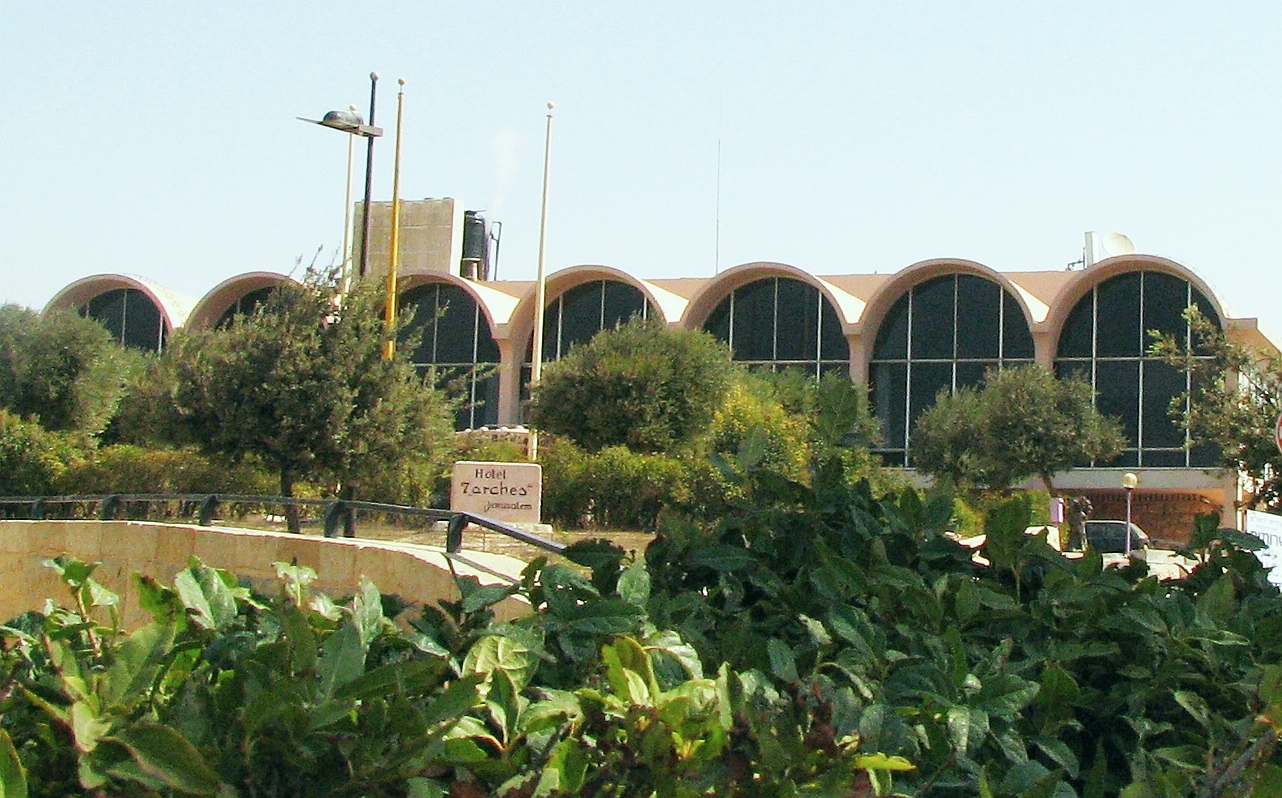
Hotel 7 Arches Jerusalem facade

The hotel was built by the Jordanian government during its period of West Bank annexation on land belonging to the Jerusalem Waqf. Originally intended to be built on the brow of the Mount of Olives overlooking the city walls, it was instead built to the south lower down the hill to avoid the seismic fault line. An access road to the hotel built by the Jordanian Jerusalem municipality cut through a section of the Mount of Olives cemetery, resulting in the destruction of numerous Jewish graves.

The hotel opened on March 20, 1964, as the Hotel Jerusalem Intercontinental, managed by the US Intercontinental Hotels chain. The Palestine Liberation Organization held its first Palestinian National Council conference at the hotel in May 1964. The hotel was slightly renamed in 1966, becoming the Hotel Inter-Continental Jerusalem, when the chain altered their branding.

After the Six-Day War, and the loss of Jordanian sovereignty over Jerusalem, the property was entrusted to the Custodian of Absentee Property.

In 1989, as a result of the First Intifada, Inter-Continental Hotels chose not to renew their management agreement with the hotel, an agreement which was first signed with the Jordanians, and later with the Custodian. The hotel changed its name to the 7 Arches Hotel, and the Custodian entrusted the management of the hotel to a local management team. The hotel has fifty employees. All, including the management team, are East Jerusalemites. Maintenance of the hotel is funded by the Israeli government.

== Today ==
The 7 Arches is a 4-star hotel with 196 rooms notable for its views of Jerusalem. Despite reports in 2010 that plans had been submitted for expansion of the hotel, the general manager of the 7 Arches, Awni Inshewat, denied this. He said there had been some confusion over an application for a building permit for a large Christian prayer tent located at the site: "The tent has been there for about five years, but the municipality said it needs a building permit, so we applied for that."
