= Bethpage =

Bethpage may refer to:

- Bethphage, Christian religious site on the Mount of Olives east of historical Jerusalem
- Bethpage, Missouri, an unincorporated community
- Bethpage, New York, a hamlet located on Long Island, United States
  - Old Bethpage, New York, a hamlet on Long Island, formerly called Bethpage
  - Bethpage State Park, a park on Long Island with five golf courses, including the
    - Bethpage Black Course, Long Island, hosted various high profile tournaments
  - Bethpage Ballpark, a baseball park in Central Islip, New York that serves as the home of the Long Island Ducks
  - Bethpage (LIRR station), on the Main Line of the Long Island Rail Road
- Bethpage, Tennessee, an unincorporated community in Sumner County, Tennessee, United States
- Bethpage Federal Credit Union, an American financial institution
