= Parish Sedghizadeh =

Academic background
- Education: B.S., Biology; D.D.S., Dentistry; M.S.,Oral Biology
- Alma mater: University of California, Los Angeles; University of Southern California; Ohio State University

Academic work
- Institutions: University of Southern California

Parish P. Sedghizadeh is a clinician-scientist, and a clinical and surgical oral and maxillofacial pathologist. He is a Professor of Clinical Dentistry, and Section Chair of Diagnostic Sciences in the Division of Periodontology, Diagnostic Sciences & Dental Hygiene at the Herman Ostrow School of Dentistry, University of Southern California. He is also the Director of the Oral Pathology and Radiology Distance Learning Program at the University of Southern California.

His research is focused on skeletal biofilm infections such as osteomyelitis, osteonecrosis, and peri-implantitis. His work includes benchtop investigations into the microbiology and pathology of skeletal infections, and chemical synthesis and testing of novel antimicrobial therapeutics for in vivo and clinical applications in infectious bone disease. He has also conducted clinical trials and translational studies investigating risk factors and therapeutic interventions in osteoporotic and cancer patients with medication-related osteonecrosis of the jaw (MRONJ).

He is a fellow of the Pierre Fauchard Academy.

== Early life and education ==
Sedghizadeh received a B.S. in Biology from the University of California, Los Angeles in 1996 and a D.D.S. in Dentistry from the University of Southern California in 2001. He then joined Ohio State University, where he completed a residency in Oral and Maxillofacial Pathology and received a M.S. in Oral Biology in 2004.

== Career ==
In 2004, Sedghizadeh joined the University of Southern California as an assistant professor, becoming an associate professor in 2017, and a full professor in 2021. He developed and serves as the program director for the USC Oral Pathology and Radiology Hybrid Distance Learning Program.

Sedghizadeh was appointed as Section Chair of Diagnostic Sciences at the Herman Ostrow School of Dentistry in 2018.

== Research and work ==
=== Head and neck conditions ===
Sedghizadeh has nearly 100 publications in peer-reviewed journals and textbooks related to head and neck pathology. His manuscripts are highly cited in the literature. Sedghizadeh has received intramural research funding, and extramural grants from the National Institutes of Health, to support his work as a principal investigator.

Sedghizadeh's work identified for the first time that biofilm pathogens are associated with several head and neck conditions, and he has characterized their role in the pathogenesis of such clinical diseases. These conditions include jaw osteomyelitis, osteonecrosis of the jaw (ONJ) associated with anti-resorptive therapy, and ophthalmologic failed surgical stents.

With respect to his main focus of clinical research into jawbone infections like osteomyelitis and osteonecrosis, his work led to the development of novel in vitro and in vivo models to study biofilms, and unique antimicrobial strategies against biofilm pathogens. Sedghizadeh helped test novel cold plasma-based antibiofilm therapeutics for dental applications as a transdisciplinary collaboration with plasma physicists and plasma engineers at USC. In a collaboration with electrical engineers and electromicrobiologists, he characterized and discovered electrically conductive nanowires in pathogenic biofilms isolated from his patients with jawbone infections. Working with chemists, Sedghizadeh designed and tested novel bone-targeted antibiotic conjugates to treat bone infections.

=== Medication-related osteonecrosis of the jaw ===
Sedghizadeh established a research program on medication-related osteonecrosis of the jaw (MRONJ) with a transdisciplinary collaborative team initially supported by an institutional interdisciplinary grant and departmental funds at USC. His team has systematically studied and contributed data to the literature addressing the determinants of MRONJ clinically and from a transdisciplinary approach. As a clinician-scientist, his body of work in this field includes observational, descriptive and mechanistic studies, and has encompassed in vitro, ex vivo, and in vivo studies in addition to clinical investigations into pathogenesis and novel therapeutics.

Sedghizadeh's team designed and conducted observational clinical studies into MRONJ patients and published the first epidemiologic institutional study linking MRONJ with oral bisphosphonate drug use in osteoporosis patients. He characterized the pathology and defined the biofilm microbiology of MRONJ specimens to elucidate mechanisms of disease, defined pharmacometric parameters in MRONJ patients and developed a statistical Bayesian-based population pharmacometric paradigm for MRONJ risk assessment clinically, identified novel risk factors associated with MRONJ development clinically, and conducted clinical studies into novel bone-targeted therapeutics.

== Awards and honors ==
- 2001 - R.L. Fowkes and L.J. Fogel Memorial Award – Southern California Academy of Oral Pathology
- 2001-2004 - Fellow and Scholarship Recipient – American Cancer Society (ACS)
- 2001-2005 - Fellow – American Academy of Oral and Maxillofacial Pathology (AAOMP)
- 2007 - Eminent Scientist of the Year in Medical Research and Pathology – World Scientists Forum and International Research Promotion Council
- 2008 - Charles E. English Annual Award in Clinical Science and Techniques – International Congress of Oral Implantologists
- 2009-2015 - Health Disparities Scholar and Grant Recipient – National Institutes of Health (NIH), National Institutes on Minority Health and Health Disparities (NIMHD)
- 2016 - Fellowship Award, Pierre Fauchard Academy
- 2019 - USC Stevens Center for Innovation Research Award for Best Commercial Impact
- 2019 - USC Excellence in Teaching Award from the Ostrow School of Dentistry
- 2020 - Fellowship Award, International College of Dentists
- 2021 - USC Stevens Center for Innovation Commercialization Award

== Publications ==
- Sun S, Tao J, Sedghizadeh PP, Cherian P, Junka AF, Sodagar E, Xing L, Boeckman RK, Srinivasan V, Yao Z, Boyce BF, Lipe B, Neighbors JD, Russell RGG, McKenna CE, Ebetino FH. Bisphosphonates for delivering drugs to bone. Br J Pharmacol 2021.
- Sedghizadeh PP, Sun S, Sodagar E, Cherian P, Chen C, Junka AF, Neighbors JD, McKenna CE, Russell RGG, Ebetino FH. Bisphosphonates in Dentistry: Historical Perspectives, Adverse Effects, and Novel Applications. Bone 2021.
- Zhong E, Chang A, Stucky A, Chen X, Mundluru T, Khalifeh M, Sedghizadeh PP. Genomic analysis of oral lichen planus and related oral microbiome. Pathogens 2020;9(11):952.
- Sedghizadeh PP, Sun S, Junka A, Richard E, Sadrerarfi K, Mahabady S, Bakhshalian N, Tjokro N, Bartoszewicz M, Oleksy M, Szymczyk P, Lundy MW, Neighbors JD, RG Russell, McKenna CE, Ebetino FH. Design, Synthesis, and Antimicrobial Evaluation of a Novel Bone-Targeting Bisphosphonate-Ciprofloxacin Conjugate for the Treatment of Osteomyelitis Biofilms. J Med Chem 2017;60:2326-43.
- Mahabady S, Tjokro N, Aharonian S, Zadeh HH, Chen C, Allayee H, Sedghizadeh PP. The in vivo Th17 and Treg immune response to Aggregatibacter actinomycetemcomitans. Mol Oral Microbiol 2017;32:490-99.
- Junka A, Szymczyk P, Ziółkowski G, Karuga-Kuzniewska E, Smutnicka D, Bil-Lula I, Bartoszewicz M, Mahabady S, Sedghizadeh PP. Bad to the Bone: on in vitro and ex vivo microbial biofilm ability to directly destroy colonized bone surfaces without participation of host immunity or osteoclastogenesis. PLoS One 2017; 11;12(1): e0169565.
- Sedghizadeh PP, Kumar KSS, Gorur A, Schaudinn C, Shuler CF, Costerton JW. Identification of microbial biofilms in osteonecrosis of the jaws secondary to bisphosphonate therapy. J Oral Maxillofac Surg 2008;66:767-75.
- Sedghizadeh PP, Stanley K, Caligiuri M, Hofkes S, Lowry B, Shuler CF. Oral bisphosphonate use and the prevalence of osteonecrosis of the jaw: an institutional inquiry. J Am Dent Assoc 2009;140:61-66.
- Kumar SKS, Ram S, Jorgensen MG, Shuler CF, Sedghizadeh PP. Multicentric peripheral ossifying fibroma. J Oral Science 2006;48:239-43.
- Sedghizadeh PP, Kumar SKS, Gorur A, Schaudinn C, Shuler CF, Costerton JW. Microbial biofilms in osteomyelitis of the jaw and osteonecrosis of the jaw secondary to bisphosphonate therapy. J Am Dent Assoc 2009;140:1259-65.
- Sedghizadeh PP, Shuler CF, Allen CM, Beck FM, Kalmar JR. Celiac disease and recurrent aphthous stomatitis: a report and review of the literature. Oral Surg Oral Med Oral Pathol Oral Radiol 2002;94:474-8.
- Schaudinn C, Gorur A, Keller D, Sedghizadeh PP, Costerton JW. Periodontitis: an archetypical biofilm disease. J Am Dent Assoc 2009;140:978-86.
- Melnick M, Sedghizadeh PP, Allen CM, Jaskoll T. Human cytomegalovirus and mucoepidermoid carcinoma of salivary glands: cell-specific localization of active viral and oncogenic signaling proteins is confirmatory of a causal relationship. Exp Mol Pathol 2011;92:118-25.
- Stoodley P, Ehrlich GD, Sedghizadeh PP, Hall-Stoodley L, Baratz ME, Altman DT, Sotereanos NG, Costerton JW, DeMeo P. Orthopedic biofilm infections. Curr Ortho Pract 2011;22:558-63.
- Jiang C, Chen MT, Gorur A, Schaudinn C, Jaramillo DE, Costerton JW, Sedghizadeh PP, Vernier PT, Gundersen MA. Nanosecond pulsed plasma dental probe. Plasma Process Polym 2009;6:479-83.
- Jiang C, Chen MT, Schaudinn C, Gorur A, Vernier T, Costerton JW, Jaramillo DE, Sedghizadeh PP, Gundersen MA. Pulsed atmospheric-pressure cold plasma for endodontic disinfection. IEEE Trans Plasma Science 2009; 37:1190-95.
- Sedghizadeh PP, Rojas R, Malfaz JM. Chapter 10: Imaging interpretation. In: Ingle’s Endodontics 7th ed, BC Decker Inc., 2019; ISBN 978-1-60795-192-6.
- Sedghizadeh PP, Jones AC. Chapter 12: Osteonecrosis of the jaw. In: The Duration and Safety of Osteoporosis Treatment: Anabolic and Antiresorptive Therapy. Silverman and Abrahamsen, eds. Springer, 2015; ISBN 978-3-319-23639-1.
