= KPMP =

KPMP may refer to:

- Pompano Beach Airpark (ICAO code KPMP)
- KPMP-LP, a defunct low-power television station (channel 2) formerly licensed to serve Winnemucca, Nevada, United States
