= Frangella =

Frangella is a surname. Notable people with the surname include:

- Andrew Frangella (born 1977), American dentist
- Barbara Frangella (born 1996), Argentine volleyball player
- Luis Frangella (1944–1990), Argentine painter and sculptor
