= ICOI =

ICOI may refer to:

- International Congress of Oral Implantologists, a professional association on implantology
- Islamic Center of Irvine, a mosque and Islamic community center in the United States
