= Rashad Murad =

Syrian Dentist

Rashad Mohammed Thabit Murad
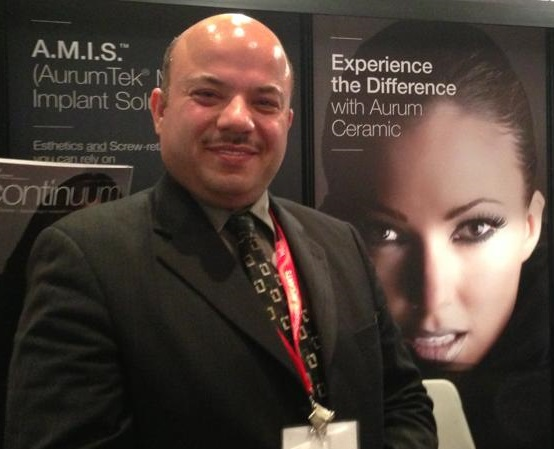
- Born: Riyadh
- Medical career
- Field: Dentistry; Pharmacology
- Research: Dentistry; Pharmacology
- Awards: The Syrian Insignia Of Fidelity

Rashad Mohammed Thabet Murad (born 1970) is a Syrian dentist. Born in Riyadh, he grew up and was educated in Syria, graduating from the Faculty of Dentistry at Al-Ba'ath University in 1992.

On 12 May 2015 the International Congress of Oral Implantologists (ICOI) appointed him as an international president representing their interests in Syria.

== Early life and education ==
Born in Riyadh in a well-known Damascene family, he lived and received education in Syria; he graduated from Ibn Khaldon high school in 1987, and joined the Faculty of Dentistry at Al-Ba'ath University, graduating with a seventh rank in 1992. He received several certificates in: Dentistry, Pharmacy, Management, Public Health, Pharmacology, Dental Implants.

== Career ==
Rashad established a medical center in Damascus in the name of advanced dental care for dental treatment and cosmetic dentistry, in which he, along with a medical cadre of his assistants, provides all medical services, the most important of which are cosmetic.

On 12 May 2015, he was appointed as an international president of ICOI, representative the organization in the Syrian Arab Republic. He was then re-elected to the same position in 2019.

He has given lectures on dentistry in many countries, including Japan, the United States of America, Australia, and Germany.

== Murad bridge ==
Murad holds a patent for the invention of the so-called Murad bridge, based on the Murad pontic, a new version to the pontic used in the bridge. Usually, porcelain on metal was used but Murad came with a solution to use acrylic material on metal. The patent was granted on 4 December 2011, registered with the number WO2013137835A1.

== Contributions ==
- In 2013, Murad was awarded the Order of devotion of the first degree by the Syrian Government for his work on braces in dentistry.
- Dr. Rashad was also awarded the First Class Medal of Fidelity by the President of the Syrian Arab Republic, thus becoming the first university professor, pharmacist and dentist to receive this medal.

== Publication ==
- The Magnesium and Its Bioactive Effects 2021
- The Thought and Prospects of Rashad Murad 2020
- Medical and Pharmacology Ethics 2020
- Communication Skills in Medicine 2020
- The Physiological Harmony 2020
- Textbook of Ambulatory Medicine 2019
- The Modern Hematology and Immunology 2018
- The Balanced Food journey 2018
- Applied Therapeutics 2017
- Drugs Interactions 2017
- Essentials of Pharmacology for Dentistry, Arabic-English Bilingual Edition - 2016
- Prevention and management of obesity in adults – 2016
- (Pharmacology - practical) - The Ministry of Higher Education - the University of Damascus – 2016
- Pharmacodynamics – Faculty of Pharmacy – Damascus University 2016
- (Good Pharmacy Practice) – 2015
- Advisor in Dentistry Journal . Scientific, Social and Health Journal 2012 published every six months by Prof. Rashad Murad 2013- till now .
- Internal Diseases and Pharmacology Ministry of Higher Education, Aleppo University Publications, Dental Technical Institute 2012-2013 Prof. Rashad Murad Prof. Muhamad Saad Shayeb
- Pharmacology in Dentistry Damascus University Publications, Faculty of Dentistry 2012-2013 Prof. Sawsan Madi Prof. Rashad Murad
- World of Dentistry 2012 Prof. Rashad Murad
- Swan Flu, Facts and Myths 2010 Prof. Nabil Kochaji Dr. Rashad Murad
- Helping Guideline in Pharmacology 2004 Dr. Rashad Murad Dr. Natalia Takriti
