= Thomas Powell (American landowner) =

American landowner (1641–1721/22)

Thomas Powell (1641–1721/22) was a landowner in the middle section of Long Island in the Province of New York during the colonial period of American history. He secured the land transaction known as the Bethpage Purchase with local native tribes on Long Island.

== Early life ==
Powell was born in August or October 1641. (Note: Some sources say the 8th month, which on Old Style calendar was October. Some sources say August, some say October.) Puritans Thomas Powell (1616–1681) and Priscilla Powell (nee Whitson) are sometimes given as the names of his parents. Sources disagree on whether Powell was born in Wales, United Kingdom or in Connecticut. Some sources say that Powell's parents were involved with the Reverend John Davenport, who led a group of Puritans to settle in the New Haven Colony in present-day New Haven, Connecticut. Several sources say Powell's father was involved with the sack and rum trade. (Note: Some sources say Powell's father was a captain.)

Court records from 1662 for the Town of Huntington, New York, indicate that thomas Powell indentured servant in the Jonas Halifax Wood home living with them nine years. After almost nine years of service to Master Good Wood, and Good Higbe, Powell gave written testimony for the inventory books against the estate of Jonas Halifax Wood of Hempstead regarding an unpaid debt for rum and wine at Daniel Whiteheads store following Wood's death. (Note: One source indicates Powell.) Records from 1666 show Powell acting as attorney for Matthews in the sale of lands in Oyster Bay. Sources list Powell's first wife's name as unknown. (Note: It was commonplace that terms of indentured servitude would be for 7 years to 9 years, or until a young person became 21.) After completing his service, Powell lived for several years in Huntington. Powell filled positions within the administration of Huntington, including town recorder in the year 1658 and is listed as doing so in the Huntington town history timeline., constable, surveyor, overseer, and trustee. In 1682, Powell declined to serve again as constable, because the job required the officer to swear to levy and collect rates for the Church of England, and he had, by then, become a Quaker.

=== Historical background ===
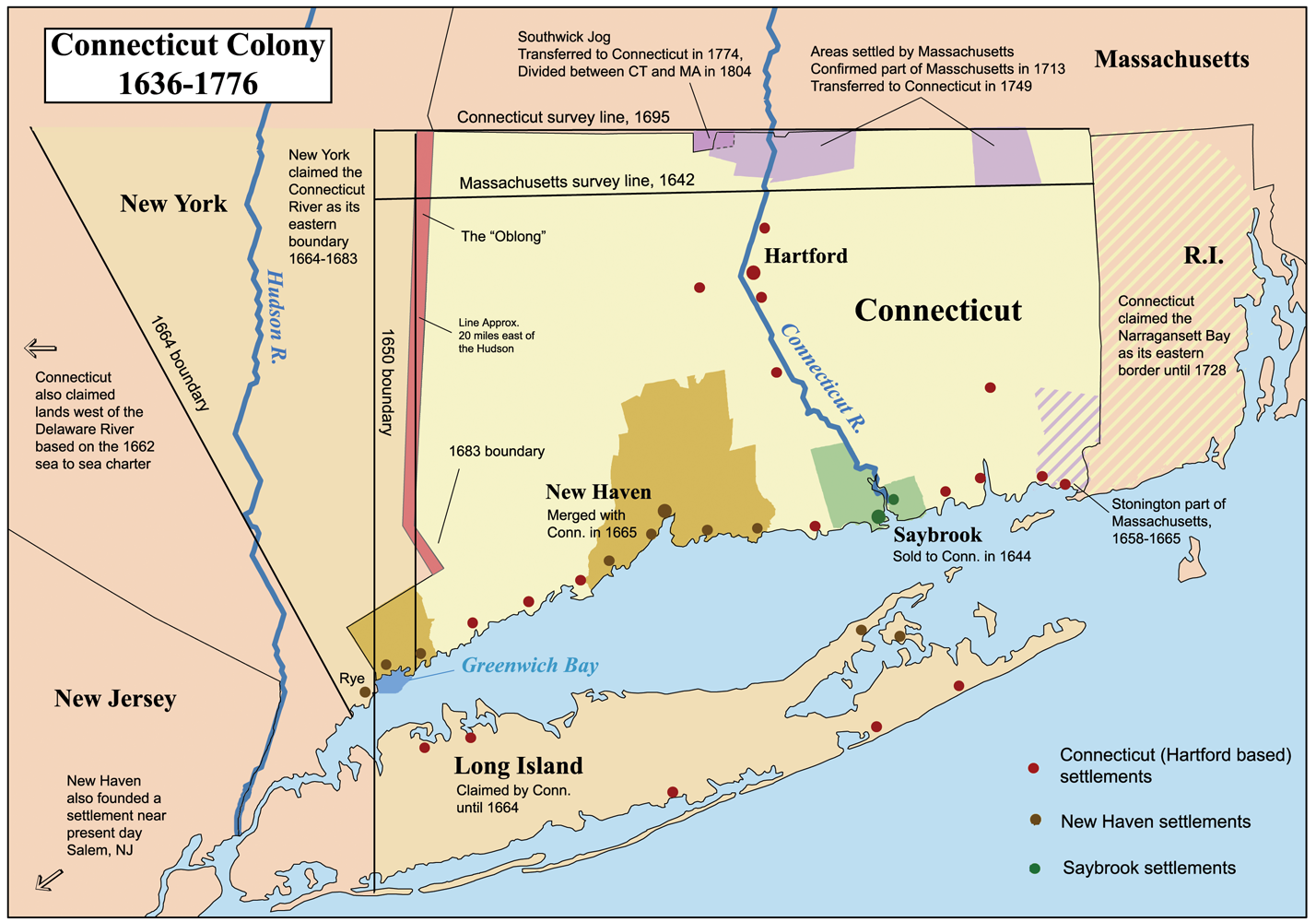
A map of the Connecticut, New Haven, and Saybrook colonies.

Founded by a group of Separatists and Anglicans, who together later came to be known as the Pilgrims, Plymouth Colony (in Massachusetts) was founded in 1620 by those who sailed aboard the Mayflower. The colony was one of the earliest successful colonies to be founded by the English in North America, and the first sizeable permanent English settlement in what is now the New England region. Soon other colonies were established in New England.

A Puritan minister named John Davenport led his flock from exile in the Netherlands back to England and finally to America in the spring of 1637. The group arrived in Boston on the ship Hector on June 26, but decided to strike out on their own, based on their impression that the Massachusetts Bay Colony was lax in its religious observances. In April 1638, the main party of five hundred Puritans left Massachusetts under the leadership of Davenport and the London merchant Theophilus Eaton, and sailed into their new haven. The Quinnipiac Native Americans, who were under attack by neighboring Pequots, had sold their land to Eaton and the settlers in return for protection. These settlers established the New Haven Colony. In 1662, the colony merged with the Connecticut Colony.

The English Civil War took place from 1642 to 1651, and England was without a monarch until 1660. Quakerism was founded by George Fox (1624–1691) in England in the late 1640s. The first Quaker missionaries arrived on America in Boston in 1656, and 1657 on Long Island. Quakers were officially persecuted in England under the Quaker Act (1662) and the Conventicle Act 1664. This was relaxed after the Declaration of Indulgence (1687–1688) and stopped under the Act of Toleration 1689. Peter Stuyvesant, the Dutch Director-General of New Netherland, had also banned Quaker worship despite the 1657 Flushing Remonstrance. Many Quakers settled further east in Oyster Bay, which was near the boundary between Dutch and British land. George Fox later visited Oyster Bay in 1672.

Until 1664, Long Island was split, roughly at the present border between Nassau County and Suffolk County, between the Dutch in the west and Connecticut claiming the east. The Dutch did grant an English settlement in Hempstead (now in Nassau), but drove settlers from Oyster Bay as part of a boundary dispute. In 1664, all of Long Island became part of the Province of New York within the Shire of York. Present-day Suffolk County was the East Riding of Yorkshire, while present-day Queens and Nassau were just part of the larger North Riding. In 1683, Yorkshire was dissolved and Suffolk County and Queens County were established. (Nassau County was not formed until 1899, when it split from Queens County.)

== Land purchases ==
In 1686, Governor Thomas Dongan of New York urged the Town of Huntington to complete the purchase from the local Native Americans of any lands not already purchased. Powell, who had substantial holdings of land in Huntington, was chosen by the town to offer to buy more lands from the Native Americans.

The Bethpage Purchase was a 1687 land transaction in which Powell bought more than 15 square miles (39 km^{2}) (about 10,000 acres) in central Long Island, New York for £140 (English pounds sterling) from local Native Americans in the United States tribes, including the Marsapeque, Matinecoc, and Sacatogue. It is approximately 3.5 miles (5.6 km) east to west and 5 miles (8.0 km) north to south. This land covers both sides of the present-day border between Nassau and Suffolk counties — all or parts of present-day Bethpage, Farmingdale, Old Bethpage, Plainedge, Plainview, and South Farmingdale (all in Nassau), and East Farmingdale and Melville (both in Suffolk). Nassau County was not a separate county until 1899, and was, at the time of the purchase, part of Queens County. Most of the Bethpage Purchase is in the Town of Oyster Bay in Nassau. The portions in Suffolk were all then within the Town of Huntington. In 1872, the Town of Huntington was subdivided, and East Farmingdale became part of the Town of Babylon.

Almost eight years later, on October 18, 1695, Mawmee (alias Serewanos), William Chepy, Seurushung, and Wamussum made their marks on the sheepskin deed for the purchase. The deed, which recognizes Powell had already been in possession of part of the land for more than seven years, is recorded in the Queens County Clerks office, and in it, the Native Americans reserved the right to pick berries and hunt on the property sold.

Powell called the land he purchased "Bethphage", because it was situated between two other places on Long Island, Jericho and Jerusalem, just as the biblical town of Bethphage (meaning "house of figs") was situated between Jericho and Jerusalem in Israel. Today, the Long Island place formerly called "Jerusalem" is known as Wantagh and Island Trees, while the placename Jericho, also a Quaker settlement at that time, still has that name. Over time, the second "H" was dropped from the name, to spell "Bethpage".

Sources also mention he made a second purchase, in 1699, called the "Rim of the Woods Purchase", which includes land to the west of the original Bethpage Purchase; including most of present-day Bethpage and all the land in the northern section of present-day Plainedge (Boundary Avenue, north to Old Motor Parkway, and Hicksville Road east to Cedar Drive). By 1700, very little of Long Island had not been purchased from the Native Americans by the English colonists, and townships controlled whatever land had not already been distributed.

== Later life and legacy ==
Powell and his first wife Abigail Wood had eight children, including another Thomas Powell (1665–1731), the fourth Thomas Powell. His first wife died before 1688 in Westbury, after which Powell married Elizabeth Phillips, of Jericho, Long Island, February 9, 1690, in Westbury. They had seven children. Most sources, when mentioning where Powell himself resided, state Westbury. Powell sold pieces of Bethphage to other Quaker farmers. His sons did live in the Bethpage Purchase. One of two houses Powell built in the area (circa 1700) still stands on Merritts Road in Farmingdale, just north of the Bethpage-Hempstead Turnpike.

Powell died February 28, 1722 [O.S. February 28, 1721], (Note: Note that the Old Style calendar was in use at that time. Sources say Powell died on the 28th day of the 12th month in 1721. In Old Style dating, New Year's Day was March 25. Thus, February would be the 12th month and would still be in the "previous" year, making the date of death December 28, 1721.) in Westbury, New York, another Quaker settlement. His remaining property was split among his children and their heirs, in accordance with his will. Children mentioned in the will are Thomas, Abigail Willets, John, Jonas, Caleb, Wait, Elisha, Solomon, Elizabeth Titus, Sarah, Amey, Mercy, Hannah Willis, Phebe Willis, and Rachel Willets. As a result, several farming communities developed. Three separate communities within the original Bethpage Purchase have, at one time or another, been named Bethpage. The first community was centered in present-day Farmingdale around Merritts Road, just north of the Hempstead-Bethpage Turnpike; the second was present-day Old Bethpage; and the latest is present-day Bethpage.
