= New York World War II Army airfields =

New York World War II Army Airfields
- Part of United States Army Air Forces

Site information
- Type: Army Airfields

Site history
- Built: 1940–1944
- In use: 1940–present

During World War II, the United States Army Air Forces (USAAF) established numerous airfields in New York for training pilots and aircrews of USAAF fighters and bombers.

Most of these airfields were under the command of First Air Force or the Army Air Forces Training Command (AAFTC) (A predecessor of the current-day United States Air Force Air Education and Training Command). However the other USAAF support commands (Air Technical Service Command (ATSC); Air Transport Command (ATC) or Troop Carrier Command) commanded a significant number of airfields in a support roles.

It is still possible to find remnants of these wartime airfields. Many were converted into municipal airports, some were returned to agriculture and several were retained as United States Air Force installations and were front-line bases during the Cold War. Hundreds of the temporary buildings that were used survive today, and are being used for other purposes.

== Major airfields ==
Air Technical Service Command

- Buffalo MAP, Buffalo

Joint use USAAF/Civil Airport
Aircraft modification center.
Also contract flying school operated by Curtiss-Wright Corp.
Now: Buffalo Niagara International Airport
(IATA: BUF, ICAO: KBUF, FAA LID: BUF)

- Farmingdale AAF, Farmingdale

436th Army Air Force Base Unit
Used by Republic Aircraft
Now: Republic Airport (IATA: FRG, ICAO: KFRG)

- Niagara Falls MAP, Niagara Falls

Aircraft modification center
Niagara Falls International Airport
(IATA: IAG, ICAO: KIAG, FAA LID: IAG) and
Niagara Falls Air Reserve Station

- Rome AAF, Rome

420th Army Air Force Base Unit (Rome ASC)
Was: Rome Air Force Base (1948)
Was: Griffiss Air Force Base (1948-1991)
Now: Rome Laboratory (1991-Pres)

Wheeler Sack Field AAF, Deferiet
Sub-base of Rome AAF
Supported Fort Drum
Now: Wheeler-Sack Army Airfield, Active US Army Airfield.

- Syracuse AAB, Syracuse

393d Army Air Force Base Unit (Rome ASC)
Now: Syracuse Hancock International Airport
(IATA: SYR, ICAO: KSYR, FAA LID: SYR)
Hancock Field Air National Guard Base

Air Transport Command

- La Guardia Field, New York City

523d Army Air Force Base Unit (Reduced)
Joint use USAAF/Civil Airport
Now: La Guardia Airport
(IATA: LGA, ICAO: KLGA, FAA LID: LGA)

- Albany MAP, Albany

Joint use USAAF/Civil Airport
Now: Albany International Airport
(IATA: ALB, ICAO: KALB, FAA LID: ALB)

First Air Force

- Mitchel AAF, Garden City

1st Army Air Force Base Unit
Was: Mitchel Air Force Base (1947-1961)
Now: Non-flying facility part of greater NYC urbanised area.

- Suffolk County AAF, Westhampton Beach

437th Army Air Force Base Unit
Was: Suffolk County Air Force Base (1947-1969)
Was: Suffolk County Airport (1969-1991) and Suffolk County Air National Guard Base (1970-1991)
Now: Francis S. Gabreski Airport
(IATA: FOK, ICAO: KFOK, FAA LID: FOK) and
Francis S. Gabreski Air National Guard Base

Air Education and Training Command

- Stewart AAF, Newburgh

320th Army Air Force Base Unit
Supported United States Military Academy, West Point
Was: Stewart Air Force Base (1947-1970)
Now: Stewart International Airport
(IATA: SWF, ICAO: KSWF, FAA LID: SWF) and
Stewart Air National Guard Base
