= Walking Figure =

Sculpture by Donald Baechler

- Artist: Donald Baechler
- Type: Sculpture
- Medium: Aluminum
- Dimensions: 9.1 m (30 ft)
- Location: 40.843466°N 72.643316°W

Walking Figure is an outdoor sculpture by Donald Baechler, located at Francis S. Gabreski Airport in Suffolk County, New York, in the United States. The 30-foot (9.1 m) aluminum statue has received a mixed reception.
