= FourLeaf Federal Credit Union =

Federally chartered credit union headquartered in Bethpage, New York

- Company type: Credit union
- Industry: Financial services
- Founded: 1941
- Headquarters: Bethpage, New York
- Area served: Long Island, Queens, New York City, New Jersey
- Key people: Anne Brigis, Board Chair; Linda Armyn, President and CEO
- Products: Savings; checking; consumer loans; mortgages; credit cards; online banking; certificate accounts; IRAs
- Total assets: $13.4 billion (2025)
- Members: 485,688 (2025)
- Number of employees: 900+
- Website: www.fourleaffcu.com

FourLeaf Federal Credit Union (formerly Bethpage Federal Credit Union) is a federally chartered credit union headquartered in Bethpage, Long Island, New York. FourLeaf has over 480,000 members and 37 publicly accessible branches throughout Long Island, New York City and New Jersey.

Eligibility for membership is extended to anyone who lives in the United States of America. Membership is required, which is subject to approval and requires opening and maintaining a $5 FourLeaf Savings Account. Member deposits in FourLeaf accounts are insured through the National Credit Union Administration (NCUA) which operates the National Credit Union Share Insurance Fund to protect accounts at federally insured credit unions.

== History ==
Grumman Hangar 2 Credit Union was opened for employees of Grumman Aircraft Engineering Corporation on October 28, 1941. Grumman officially changed to Bethpage Aircraft Federal Credit Union in 1948 and then became Bethpage Federal Credit Union (Bethpage) in 1974. In 2003, Bethpage was approved for the largest federal community charter in the U.S., allowing its rapid growth.

In November 2024, Bethpage announced it would be rebranding and changing its name to FourLeaf Federal Credit Union in early 2025.

== Community involvement ==
FourLeaf has extensive ties to the communities it serves. For 20 years, FourLeaf has sponsored the FourLeaf Air Show, formally known as the Bethpage Air Show at Jones Beach. Since 2008, FourLeaf has held the Annual Turkey Drive benefiting Island Harvest. In 2010, FourLeaf signed a 10-year contract to sponsor the Suffolk County Sports Park in Central Islip, known as Bethpage Ballpark under their sponsorship (now known as Fairfield Properties Ballpark), home of the Long Island Ducks. In 2014, FourLeaf sponsored the football stadium at the C.W. Post Campus of Long Island University. FourLeaf also sponsors the annual Northwell Health Walk, Pet Adoption Program, and News12 Scholar Athlete, among many other community programs.
