= Bethpage, New York =

Bethpage, New York Central Park
- Hamlet and census-designated place
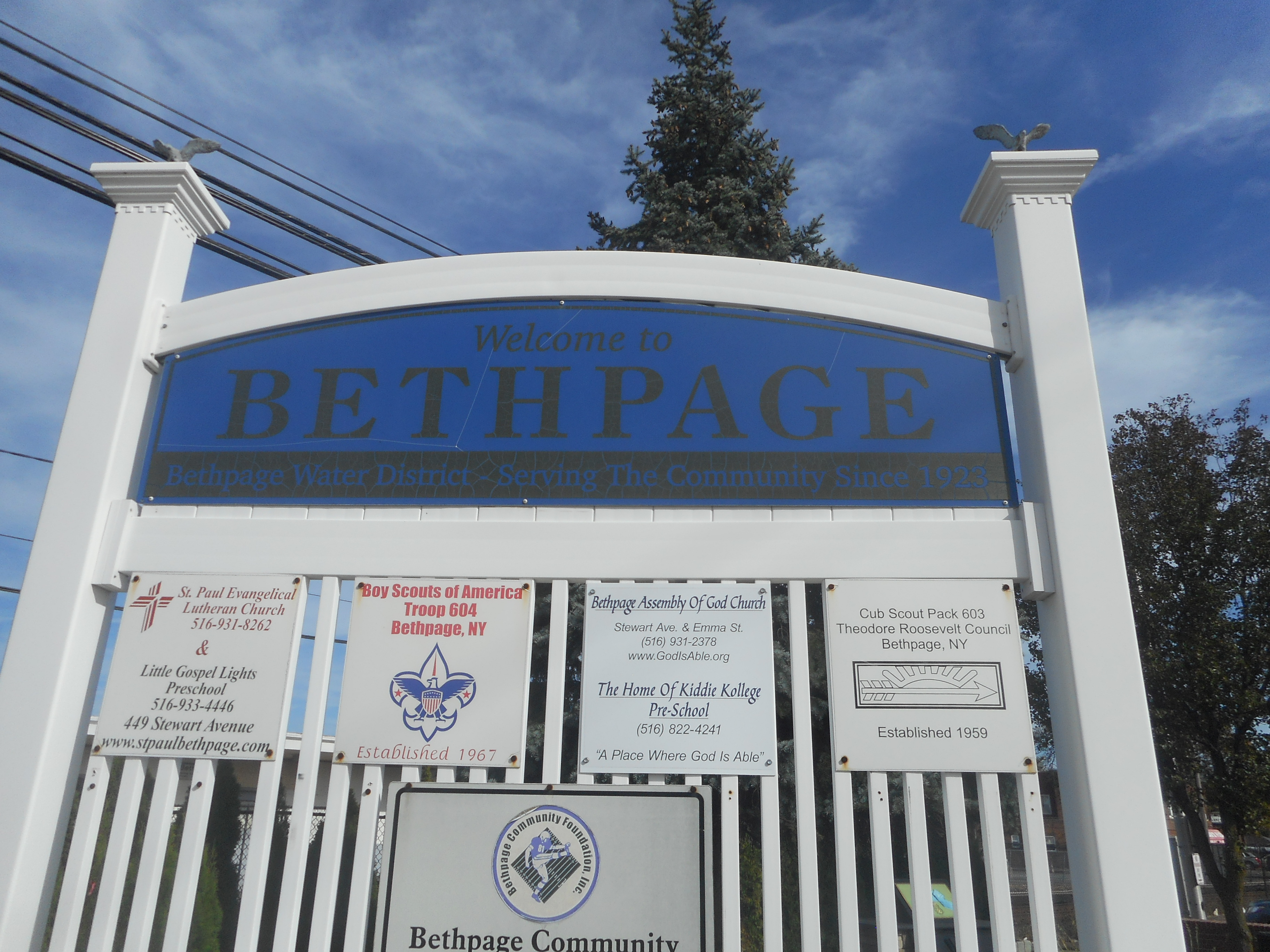
- A welcome sign for the hamlet

- Location in Nassau County and the state of New York

- Location on Long Island Location within the state of New York
- Coordinates: 40°44′48″N 73°29′4″W
- Country: United States
- State: New York
- County: Nassau
- Town: Oyster Bay
- Named for: Biblical town of Bethphage

Area
  - Total: 3.58 sq mi (9.26 km^{2})
  - Land: 3.58 sq mi (9.26 km^{2})
  - Water: 0 sq mi (0.00 km^{2})
- Elevation: 105 ft (32 m)

Population (2020)
  - Total: 16,658
  - Density: 4,658.5/sq mi (1,798.67/km^{2})
- Time zone: UTC−5 (Eastern (EST))
  - Summer (DST): UTC−4 (EDT)
- ZIP Codes: 11714 (Bethpage); 11735 (Farmingdale); 11801 (Hicksville); 11803 (Plainview)
- Area codes: 516, 363
- FIPS code: 36-06387
- GNIS feature ID: 0943803

Bethpage (formerly known as Central Park) is a hamlet and census-designated place (CDP) located within the Town of Oyster Bay in Nassau County, on the South Shore of Long Island, in New York, United States. The population was 16,658 at the time of the 2020 census.

== History ==
The name Bethpage comes from the Quaker Thomas Powell, who named the area after the Biblical town Bethphage, which was between Jericho and Jerusalem in ancient Israel. Present-day Bethpage was part of the 1695 Bethpage Purchase. An early name for the northern section of present-day Bethpage was Bedelltown, a name that appeared on maps at least as late as 1906.

On maps just before the arrival of the Long Island Rail Road (LIRR), the name Bethpage appears for a community now included in both the post office district and school district of the adjacent community of Farmingdale. In 1841, train service began to Farmingdale station, near a new settlement less than a mile eastward from what had previously appeared on maps as Bethpage. Schedules at that time do not mention Bethpage as a stop, but have a notation "late Bethpage". On an 1855 map, The location identified as Bethpage has shifted slightly southward to include a nearby area now called Plainedge.

Between 1851 and 1854, the LIRR initiated a stop within present-day Bethpage at a station then called Jerusalem Station, and on January 29, 1857, a local post office opened, also named Jerusalem Station. LIRR schedules listed the station also as simply Jerusalem. Residents succeeded in changing the name of the post office to Central Park, effective March 1, 1867 (respelled as Centralpark from 1895 to 1899). The Central Park Fire Company was organized in April 1910, and incorporated in May 1911. In May 1923 the Central Park Water District was created.

Following the 1932 opening of nearby Bethpage State Park, the name of the local post office was changed to Bethpage on October 1, 1936. The LIRR station was also renamed Bethpage station. The name Bethpage was, however, already in use by an adjacent community, which resisted suggestions of a merger and instead renamed itself Old Bethpage. The change from Central Park to Bethpage was one of the last complete name changes of Nassau County's post offices.

From 1936 until 1994, Bethpage was home to the Grumman Aircraft Engineering Corporation, which made, among other things, the F-14 Tomcat, the Navy version of the General Dynamics F-111 Aardvark and the Apollo Lunar Excursion Module (LEM) for Moon landings, and for this reason Bethpage is mentioned in the 1995 film Apollo 13. Grumman was made famous by the performance of its F4F Wildcat fighter aircraft and its successor the F6F Hellcat, which shot down 5,223 enemy aircraft, more than any other naval aircraft. In 1994, Grumman was purchased by Northrop and formed Northrop Grumman. Although no longer headquartered in Bethpage, the company still retains operations there.

The Naval Weapons Industrial Reserve Plant, Bethpage (NWIRP) started operations in 1942, west of the Grumman site.

In August 2015, a small airplane with engine trouble failed to reach Farmingdale airport, and was redirected to "Bethpage Airport" by the air traffic controller. However, the pilot could not find that airport because it was closed and had buildings on it, and the plane crashed on LIRR tracks.

=== Swedetown Village ===
In the early 1900s, Bethpage (then called Central Park) was home to a small village of early Scandinavian immigrants, whose area was north of Cherry Avenue, east of Stewart Avenue, and west of today's Seaford Oyster Bay Expressway. A Scandinavian-American Club of North Central Park formed in 1924, called Central Park North Civic Association, whose social activities and project fundraising helped improve roads, street lighting, water service, and postal service. After officially disbanding in 1959, the clubhouse, located on Stewart Avenue, became Saint Isidoro's Greek Orthodox Church.

In August 2021, Town of Oyster Bay Supervisor Joseph Saladino, with the help of Central Park Historical Society, helped unveil a historical marker celebrating the Scandinavian immigrants, located on the corner of Flamingo Lane and Caffrey Avenue.

=== Superfund site ===
Bethpage's history as a space and aviation center has left heavy metals, toxic waste, and radioactive byproducts dumped into the surrounding ground and leeching into the water. Bethpage as of 2012 has been declared a class 2 Superfund site. The rate of cancers and birth defects in Bethpage is statistically well above the national average, which many attribute to the polluted soil and ground water. Bethpage residents have taken action by filing a $500 million lawsuit against Grumman.

== Geography ==
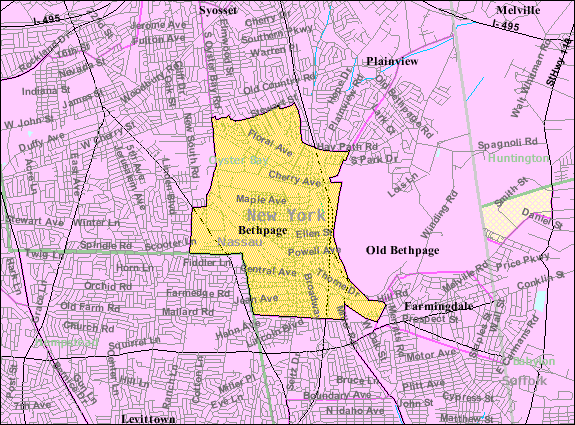
U.S. Census map of Bethpage

According to the United States Census Bureau, the CDP, or Census Designated Place, has a total area of 3.6 square miles (9.3 km^{2}), all land. For the 2000 Census, the boundaries of the CDP were adjusted compared to those of the 1990 census, with some territory gained and some lost.

Bethpage is located approximately 30 miles (50 km) east of Midtown Manhattan and 13 miles (20 km) east of the Queens border. It bounds Plainview to the north, Farmingdale and Old Bethpage to the east, Hicksville and Levittown to the west, and Plainedge to the south.

The area is served by the Bethpage Post Office, ZIP code 11714, whose boundaries are slightly different from that of the CDP. The Town of Hempstead, on its website, includes a small part of Bethpage hamlet that is in the Levittown census-designated place.

== Infrastructure ==
=== Transportation ===
The Long Island Rail Road provides service from Bethpage station primarily on the Ronkonkoma Branch and occasionally the Central Branch.

Bethpage, along with the remainder of Nassau County, is served by the Nassau Inter-County Express (NICE) bus system along Hempstead Turnpike.

The Bethpage State Parkway begins at a trumpet interchange with the Southern State Parkway in North Massapequa and runs north before terminating at a traffic circle with Plainview Road and a local park road in Bethpage State Park.

=== Public safety ===
Bethpage's fire protection is provided by the Bethpage Fire Department. Its police protection comes from the Nassau County Police Department's 8th precinct, as well as the MTA Police and Nassau County Auxiliary Police.

== Economy ==
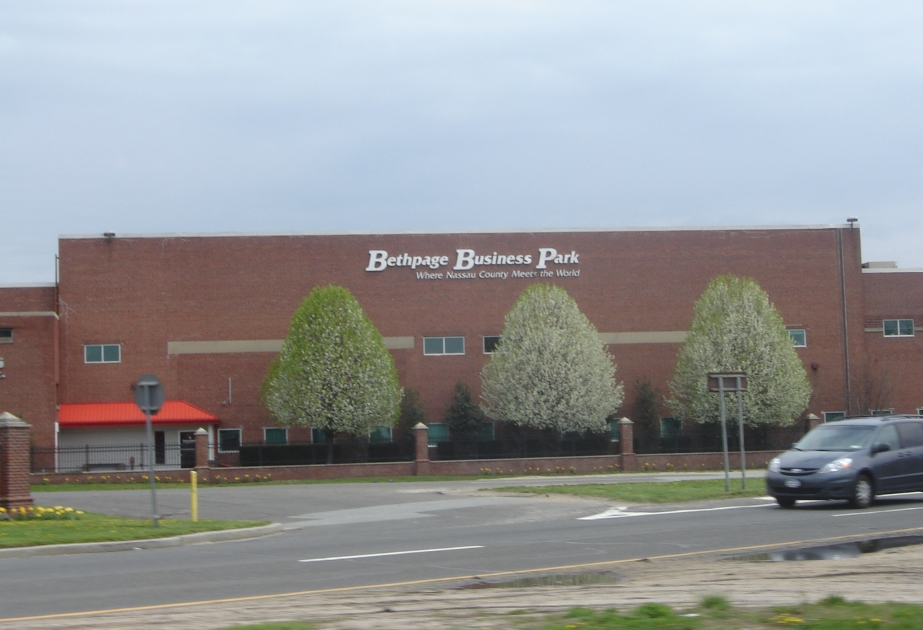
Bethpage Business Park

Bethpage is home to the North America Headquarters of technology company LogiTag and Altice, formerly known as Cablevision. USPS also has a sorting facility in the town that serves the New York region. The grocery chain King Kullen was previously headquartered in Bethpage between 2000 and 2020, before transferring their offices to Hauppauge.

Bethpage Federal Credit Union (rebranded to FourLeaf Federal Credit Union), a federally chartered credit union, is headquartered in Bethpage. It is the largest credit union in New York State and 16th largest in the nation with approximately $12.9 billion in assets, 471,284 members, and 38 publicly accessible branches throughout Nassau and Suffolk counties.

Bethpage is home to two movie studios. Gold Coast Studios has filmed major motion pictures, including The Amazing Spider-Man 2 and Sisters, as well as the television series Pan Am and Kevin Can Wait. Grumman Studios also worked on The Amazing Spider-Man 2, filmed Avengers, Salt and broadcast The Sound of Music Live!

Goya Foods has its Long Island division in Bethpage.

== Demographics ==
Historical population
Census	Pop.	Note	%±
1930	1,888		—
1940	2,590		37.2%
1960	15,840		—
1970	18,550		17.1%
1980	16,846		−9.2%
1990	15,761		−6.4%
2000	16,543		5.0%
2010	16,429		−0.7%
2020	16,658		1.4%
2023 (est.)	17,334	▲	4.1%
U.S. Decennial Census

=== Racial and ethnic composition ===
Bethpage CDP, New York – Racial and ethnic composition Note: the US Census treats Hispanic/Latino as an ethnic category. This table excludes Latinos from the racial categories and assigns them to a separate category. Hispanics/Latinos may be of any race.
Race / ethnicity (NH = Non-Hispanic)	Pop 2000	Pop 2010	Pop 2020	% 2000	% 2010	% 2020
White alone (NH)	15,066	14,095	12,292	91.07%	85.79%	73.79%
Black or African American alone (NH)	36	90	151	0.22%	0.55%	0.91%
Native American or Alaska Native alone (NH)	4	14	7	0.02%	0.09%	0.04%
Asian alone (NH)	494	895	2,066	2.99%	5.45%	12.40%
Native Hawaiian or Pacific Islander alone (NH)	0	0	4	0.00%	0.00%	0.02%
Other race alone (NH)	13	19	67	0.08%	0.12%	0.40%
Mixed race or Multiracial (NH)	145	164	336	0.88%	1.00%	2.02%
Hispanic or Latino (any race)	785	1,152	1,735	4.75%	7.01%	10.42%
Total	16,543	16,429	16,658	100.00%	100.00%	100.00%

=== 2020 census ===
As of the 2020 census, Bethpage had a population of 16,658. The median age was 45.8 years. 19.5% of residents were under the age of 18 and 22.0% of residents were 65 years of age or older. For every 100 females there were 91.1 males, and for every 100 females age 18 and over there were 88.7 males age 18 and over.

100.0% of residents lived in urban areas, while 0.0% lived in rural areas.

There were 5,810 households in Bethpage, of which 30.9% had children under the age of 18 living in them. Of all households, 60.1% were married-couple households, 11.8% were households with a male householder and no spouse or partner present, and 25.6% were households with a female householder and no spouse or partner present. About 21.6% of all households were made up of individuals and 15.6% had someone living alone who was 65 years of age or older.

There were 6,072 housing units, of which 4.3% were vacant. The homeowner vacancy rate was 1.4% and the rental vacancy rate was 5.8%. The population density was 4,658.3 inhabitants per square mile (1,798.6/km^{2}).

=== Demographic estimates ===
According to Census Bureau profile estimates, 16.7% of the population were foreign-born persons.

=== Income and poverty ===
Between 2010 and 2020, income rates for all working citizens dramatically increased. The median income for a household in the CDP was $132,832, and the median income for a family was $151,779. Nonfamily households had a median income of $53,138. The per capita income was $58,359. Approximately 4.13% of the population had lived under the poverty line, including 3.5% of persons under age 18, 4.8% of adults between ages 18 and 64, and 1.5% of adults over age 65.

=== 2010 census ===
As of the census of 2010, there were 16,429 people, 5,710 households, and 4,516 families residing in the CDP. The population density was 4,564.5 inhabitants per square mile (1,762.4/km^{2}). There were 5,788 housing units at an average density of 1,597.0 per square mile (616.6/km^{2}). The racial makeup of the CDP was 90.8% white 85.8% non-Hispanic white, 0.6% African American, 0.1% Native American, 5.5% Asian, and 1.4% from two or more races. Hispanic or Latino of any race were 7% of the population.

There were 5,710 households, of which 32% had children under 18 living with them, 66.0% were married couples living together, 10.0% had a female householder with no husband present, and 20.9% were non-families. Of all households, 17.9% were individuals, and 11.3% had someone living alone who was 65 years of age or older. The average household size was 2.89 and the average family size was 3.27.

In the CDP, the population was spread out, with 22.7% under the age of 18, 6.4% from 18 to 24, 29.0% from 25 to 44, 23.2% from 45 to 64, and 18.8% who were 65 years of age or older. The median age was 40 years. For every 100 females, there were 93.0 males. For every 100 females age 18 and over, there were 88.8 males.

The median income for a household in the CDP was $70,173, and the median income for a family was $78,573. Males had a median income of $53,404 versus $36,708 for females. The per capita income for the CDP was $27,850. About 2.1% of families and 3.3% of the population were below the poverty line, including 4.0% of those under age 18 and 4.3% of those age 65 or over.

== Arts and culture ==
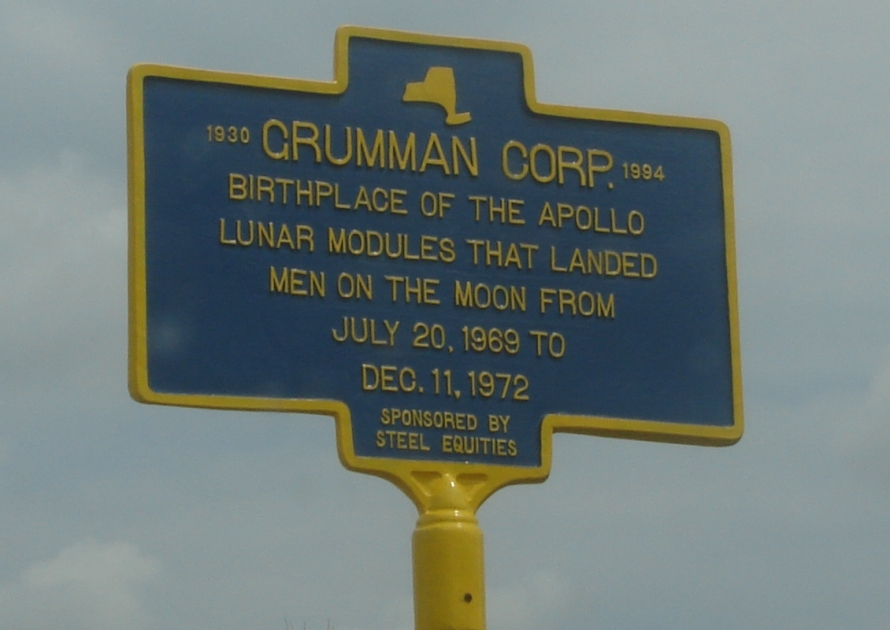
NYS Historic Marker for the Grumman Corporation

Bethpage was the home of the Grumman plant that produced the Apollo Lunar Modules, or LEMs.

Bethpage State Park offers five golf courses to choose from. One of them, the Black Course, was the site of the U.S. Open in 2002 and 2009. Tiger Woods won the event in 2002 and Lucas Glover in 2009. While the park and its five golf courses are located almost entirely within Old Bethpage and its offices are located within the neighboring Farmingdale postal district, it is easily accessed from Bethpage.

Bethpage Water District was announced as the best tasting drinking water in New York State at the New York State Fair in Syracuse in 2006. In 2010, chlorine was added to the drinking water following new Nassau County Board of Health regulations, leading many residents to complain that the taste of the water had declined.

Medal of Honor recipient Stephen Edward Karopczyc lived in Bethpage, and the former Karopczyc School in Bethpage (part of the Island Trees Union Free School District) was renamed for him. The school now houses the Island Trees Public Library.

The Town of Oyster Bay Ice Skating Center in Bethpage has an NHL-size rink for skating, and is home to the Long Island Blues special hockey team, who practice and play home games at the rink.

== Government ==
As Bethpage is an unincorporated hamlet within the Town of Oyster Bay, it is governed through said Town.

=== Representation in higher government ===
Bethpage is located in the New York State Senate's 5th State Senate district, which as of December 2024 is represented by Steven Rhoads (R–Bellmore). It is also located in the New York State Assembly's 15th and 17th, occupied by Jake Blumencranz (R–Oyster Bay) and John Mikulin (R-Bethpage), respectively.

Bethpage also rests within New York's 3rd congressional district, which as of December 2024 is represented in the United States Congress by Tom Suozzi (D–Glen Cove).

In the United States Senate, Bethpage is represented by Charles E. Schumer (D) and Kirsten Gillibrand (D).

=== Politics ===
In the 2024 U.S. presidential election, the majority of Bethpage voters voted for Donald Trump (R).

== Education ==
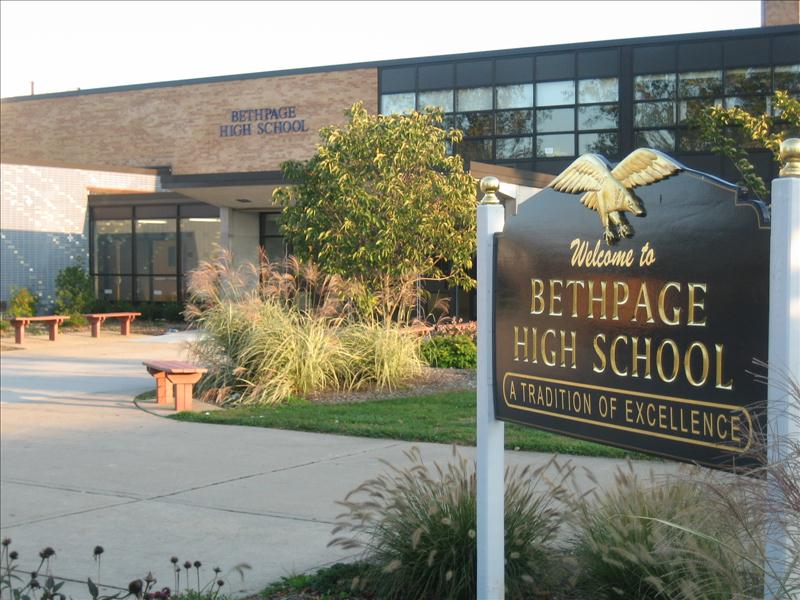
The main entrance to Bethpage High School

Bethpage residents can be zoned for the following districts:

- Bethpage Union Free School District
- Plainedge Union Free School District
- Island Trees Union Free School District
- Hicksville Union Free School District

== In popular culture ==
In November 2004, Bethpage served as the first location for the series premiere of To Catch a Predator, featuring host Chris Hansen in the television news magazine program Dateline NBC.

== Notable people ==
- Eric Asimov (born 1957), wine and food critic (The New York Times)
- Sophia Braeunlich (1854–1898), business manager, journalist
- Nicholas Braun (born 1988), actor
- Lori Carson (born 1958), singer-songwriter
- Jim Christian (born 1965), college basketball player, coach
- Glen Cummings, metal musician (Ludichrist and Scatterbrain)
- Andrew Frangella (born 1977), general dentist that specializes in cosmetic dentistry and Oral Implantology
- Jim Hodder (1947–1990), musician (Steely Dan)
- Stephen Karopczyc (1944–1967), United States Army officer and posthumous recipient of the Medal of Honor
- Ron Lynch (born 1953), stand-up comedian, actor, and writer
- Sharon MacConell (born 1962), Democratic politician of the Michigan House of Representatives from the 56th House District
- Ed Mangano (born 1962), former Nassau County Executive and convicted felon
- Thomas Michaelsen (born 1985), former lacrosse player and President and Founder of 365Lax Inc.
- John Mikulin (born 1988), New York State assemblyman of the 17th district
- Jason Moss (1975–2006), attorney, author
- Alex Reynolds (born 1987), professional wrestler for All Elite Wrestling
- Joe Sambito (born 1952), Major League Baseball pitcher
- Chanté Sandiford (born 1990), goalkeeper for Icelandic club Stjarnan and captains the Guyana national team
- Rob Scuderi (born 1978), National Hockey League player
- Thomas Secunda (born 1974), billionaire businessman and one of the four co-founders of Bloomberg L.P.
- Leslie Segrete (born 1975), designer, television personality
- Helen Slater (born 1963), actress, singer
- Gary Smulyan (born 1956), jazz musician
- Gavin Spielman (born 1972), painter
- Howard C. Vogts (1929–2010), high school football coach with most wins recorded in New York State history
- Jon Weeks (born 1986), National Football League player for the Houston Texans
- Al Weis (born 1938), Major League Baseball infielder
