= Andrew Frangella =

American dentist (born 1977)

- Born: Bethpage, New York
- Education: Lehigh University, New York University College of Dentistry
- Occupation: Dentist
- Known for: Cosmetic dentistry and Oral Implantology

Andrew Frangella DDS, FICOI, FAGD, is a US-based general dentist that specializes in cosmetic dentistry and Oral Implantology. He is known for engaging multidisciplinary approach in the field of cosmetic dentistry. Dr. Andrew is listed in the Long Island Pulse Magazine as one of America’s Top Dentists. He is also named as one of the Top 10 Dentists in Social Media.

== Early life and education ==
Born on August 20, 1977, in Bethpage, New York, the young Andrew Frangella completed his high school education at St. Anthony's High School in 1995. He proceeded to Lehigh University and graduated with B.A degree in Biology. After college, Andrew had his Dentist (DDS) training at New York University College of Dentistry.

Dr. Andrew Frangella was awarded Fellowship from the Academy of General Dentistry. He also completed Fellowships in Oral Implantology at the Misch Institute in affiliation with Temple University, Pennsylvania and the International Congress of Oral Implantologists (ICOI).

== Dental career ==
Dr. Andrew Frangella started his medical career as a cosmetic dentist trained in advanced CAD/CAM dentistry, orthodontics, endodontics, and certified in Invisalign orthodontic appliances. He currently practices general and cosmetic dentistry alongside his two sisters, Tina M. Frangella DDS, and Laura O. Frangella, DDS at Frangella Dental in Midtown Manhattan, New York.

Dr. Andrew Frangella lectures the dental community on various topics involving new technologies in the field of dentistry. Along with his two sisters in the dental field, he co-authored a book titled Social Media for Dentistry. Dr. Frangella is a fellow of the International Congress of Oral Implantologists, Academy of General Dentistry (AGD) and Misch Implant Institute. He is a co-founder of Imagine Dental Technologies, LLC and a member of the American Dental Association (ADA).

== Awards ==
- Dr. Robert A. Sussman Memorial Award (2005)
- AGD Fellowship Award (2011)

== See also ==
- Cosmetic dentistry
- Academy of General Dentistry
