= Pompano Beach Airpark =

Airport in Florida, U.S.

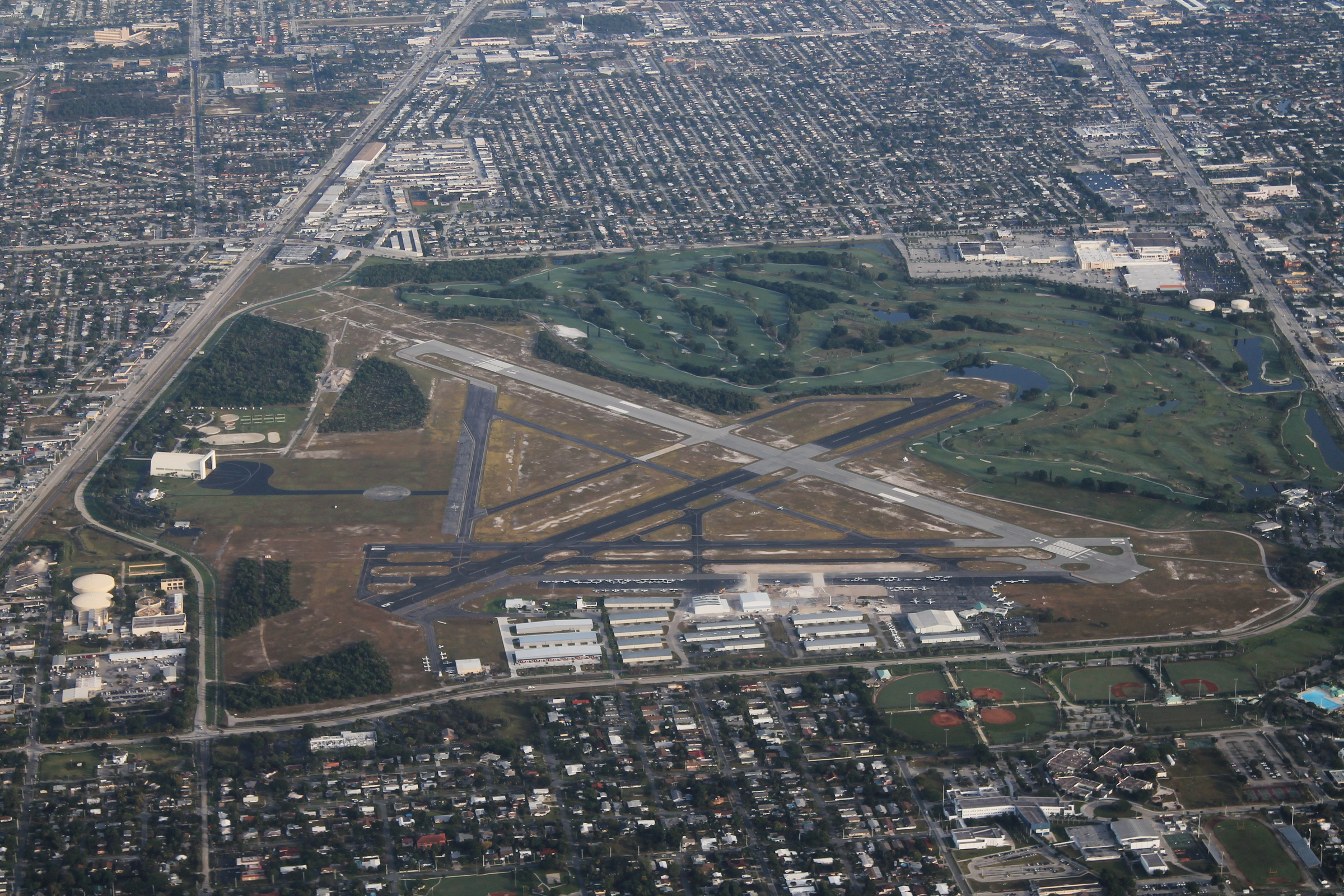
- Aerial view, December 2012
- IATA: PPM; ICAO: KPMP; FAA LID: PMP

Summary
- Airport type: Public
- Owner: City of Pompano Beach
- Location: Pompano Beach, Florida, U.S.
- Elevation AMSL: 19 ft / 6 m
- Coordinates: 26°14′50″N 080°06′40″W

Map
- Interactive map of Pompano Beach Airpark

Runways
Direction	Length		Surface
Direction	ft	m	Surface
6/24	4,001	1,220	Asphalt
10/28	3,502	1,067	Asphalt
15/33	4,918	1,499	Asphalt

Statistics (2017)
- Aircraft operations: 169,722
- Based aircraft: 131
- Source: Federal Aviation Administration

The Pompano Beach Airpark (IATA: PPM, ICAO: KPMP, FAA LID: PMP) is a public airport located one mile (1.6 km) northeast of the central business district of Pompano Beach, in Broward County, Florida, United States. The airport is publicly owned by the City of Pompano Beach.

This airport is assigned a three-letter location identifier of PMP by the Federal Aviation Administration, but the International Air Transport Association (IATA) airport code is PPM (the IATA assigned PMP to Pimaga in Papua New Guinea). The International Civil Aviation Organization (ICAO) airport code is KPMP.

== History ==
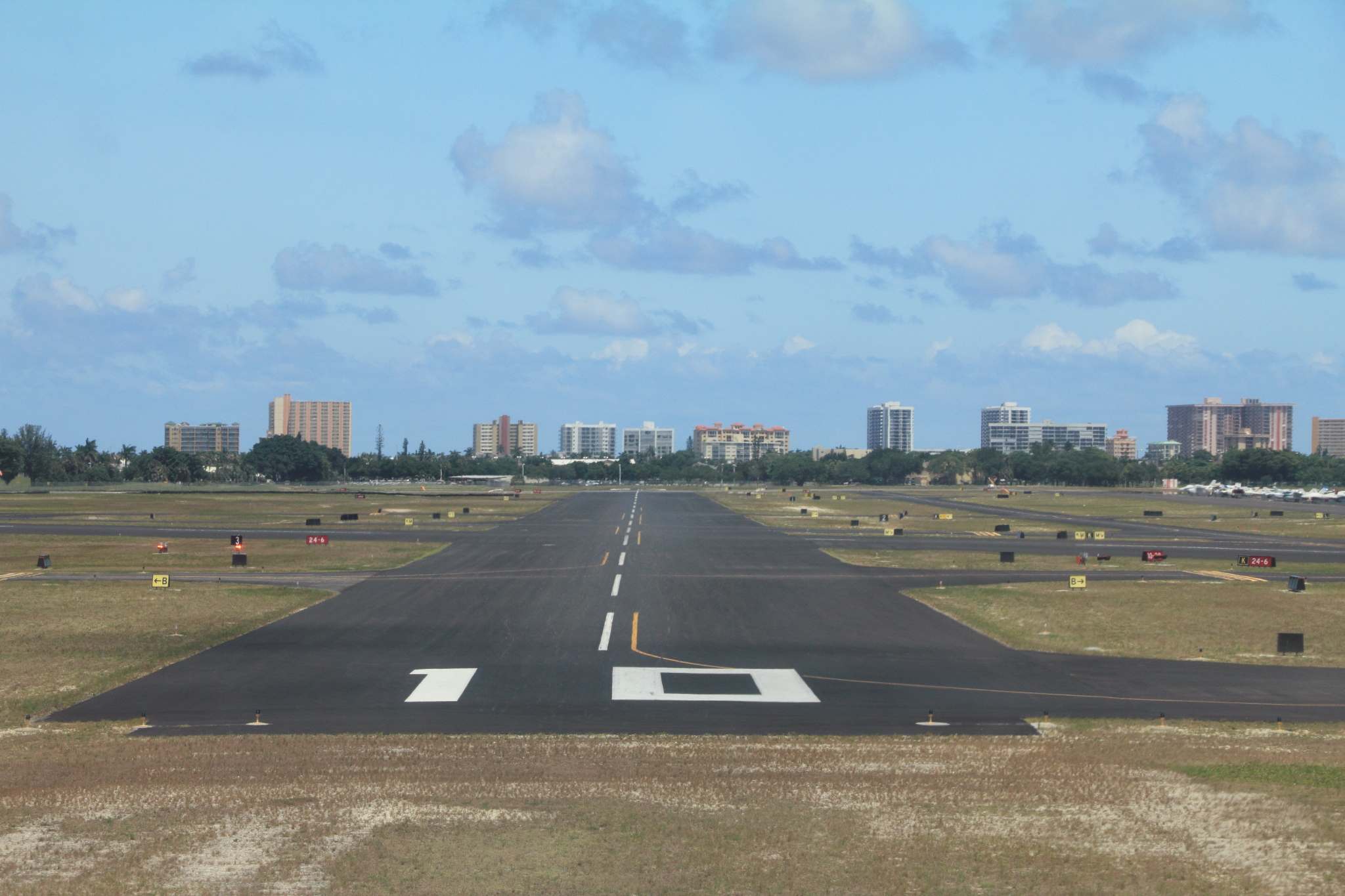
Runway, June 2011

Pompano Beach Airport was constructed during World War II as a Naval outlying landing field (NOLF) for Naval Air Station Fort Lauderdale, what is now the Fort Lauderdale-Hollywood International Airport. On August 29, 1947, the City of Pompano Beach obtained the Airport under the Surplus Property Act of 1944 and renamed it Pompano Beach Air Park, due to its intent to limit the airport's usage to general aviation. For the same reason, the City shortened Runway 15–33 from its original length of 5,000 feet (1,500 m) to a length of 4,418 feet (1,347 m) in 1971, This has since been extended to its current 4,918ft length as of 2025.

Additional lands surrounding the air park, including land along Copans Road and the Florida East Coast Railway tracks to the west of the air park, were transferred to the City on June 24, 1948, bringing the total acreage at the air park to 1,035 acres (4.19 km^{2}). On August 5, 1958, 10 acres (40,000 m^{2}) of air park property were released to the Broward County School Board for the construction of Pompano Beach Elementary School. The County received 9 more acres on September 18, 1967. On March 8, 1958, the City sold 60 acres (240,000 m^{2}), located in the northeast corner of the air park property, for development of the Pompano Square Mall. The final transfer of air park property occurred in 1981 when 10 acres (40,000 m^{2}) in the southwestern section of the air park property were purchased by the Pompano Elks Club. These transfers account for the current total 650 acres (2.6 km^{2}) of the air park.

Pompano Beach Air Park is owned by the City of Pompano Beach. The air park is a Surplus Property Act airport. The Surplus Property Act of 1944 states that any lands conveyed under the act must be used for aviation purposes or ownership reverts to the FAA. The FAA can, however, release excess portions of the property for non-aviation purposes, and any proceeds from the sale of excess property must be used to support airport growth and development under the stipulations of the Surplus Property Act.

== Facilities and aircraft ==
Pompano Beach Airpark covers an area of 650 acres (2.6 km^{2}) which contains three runways:

- Runway 6/24: 4,001 ft × 150 ft (1,220 m × 46 m), surface: asphalt
- Runway 10/28: 3,502 ft × 100 ft (1,067 m × 30 m), surface: asphalt
- Runway 15/33: 4,918 ft × 150 ft (1,499 m × 46 m), surface: asphalt

The airport also has an operational air traffic control tower under the FAA Contract Tower Program.

For 12-month period ending May 26, 2017 the airport had 169,722 aircraft operations, an average of 465 per day: 99.9% general aviation (169,506), <1% air taxi (136), and <1% military (80). There were at the time 131 aircraft based at this airport: 71% single engine (125) and 17% multi engine (12) airplanes, 8% helicopter (17), and 4% jet aircraft (4).

The Goodyear Blimp Spirit of Innovation is based out of Pompano Beach Airpark.

=== Fixed-base operators ===
- Sheltair Aviation Services
- Pompano Aviation

== Aviation schools ==
- Dare to Dream Aviation - training pilots and instructors since 2001
- Orange Wings Aviation Academy
- Florida Aviation Academy
- Learn to Fly Center
- American Flyers
- Tailwheel Academy
- XFlight

=== Charter services ===
- Skymax
- PlaneTravel Air

== Accidents and incidents ==
- On January 10, 2025, a Piper PA-44 Seminole performed a gear-up landing at the Pompano Beach Airpark. An instructor and student were onboard. There were no injuries.

== See also ==
- List of airports in Florida
