= Stephen Karopczyc =

Medal of Honor recipient (1944–1967)

Stephen Edward Karopczyc
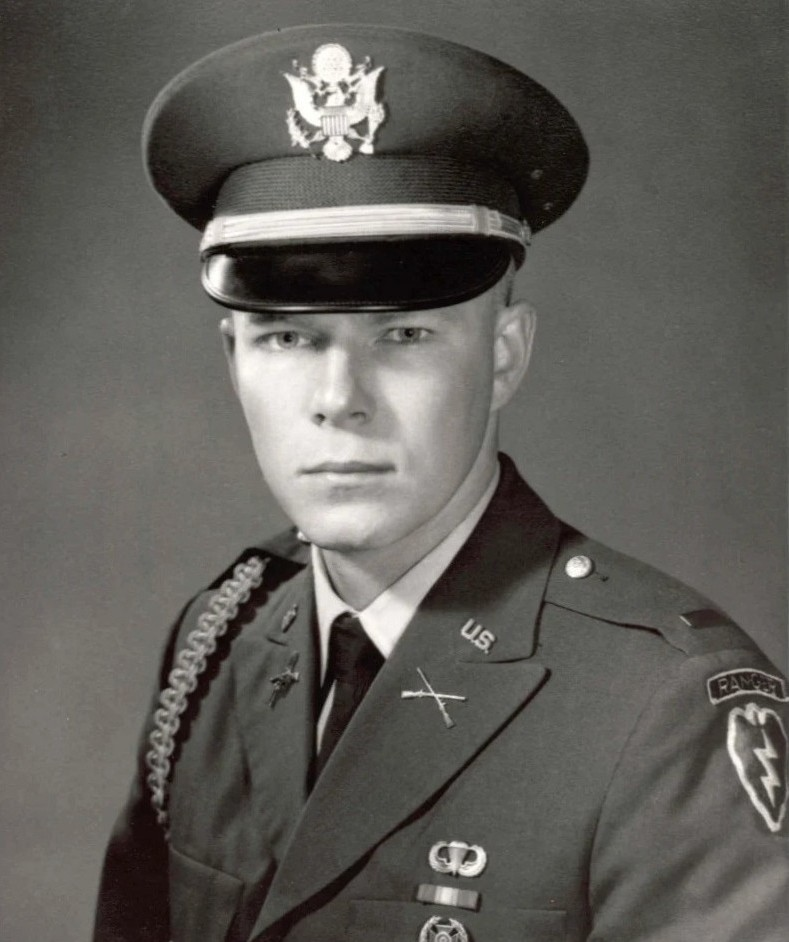
- Born: March 5, 1944; New York City, New York, US
- Died: March 12, 1967 (aged 23); Kontum Province, Republic of Vietnam
- Burial place: Long Island National Cemetery, East Farmingdale, New York
- Military career
- Allegiance: United States of America
- Branch: United States Army
- Service years: 1965–1967
- Rank: First Lieutenant
- Units: Company A, 2d Battalion, 35th Infantry, 25th Infantry Division
- Conflicts: Vietnam War †
- Awards: Medal of Honor; Purple Heart

Stephen Edward Karopczyc (March 5, 1944 – March 12, 1967) was a United States Army officer and a posthumous recipient of the Medal of Honor. He was a 1961 graduate of Chaminade High School, a 1965 graduate of Spring Hill College, then served in the United States Army in the Vietnam War. He served as a First Lieutenant with Company A, 2d Battalion, 35th Infantry Regiment (Take Arms !), 25th Infantry Division (Tropic Lightning).

== Medal of Honor Citation ==
The President of the United States of America, in the name of Congress, takes pride in presenting the Medal of Honor (Posthumously) to First Lieutenant (Infantry) Stephen Edward Karopczyc (ASN: 0-5328049), United States Army (Reserve), for conspicuous gallantry and intrepidity at the risk of his life above and beyond the call of duty while serving with the 2d Battalion, 35th Infantry Regiment, 25th Infantry Division, in action against enemy aggressor forces at Kontum Province, Republic of Vietnam, on 12 March 1967.

For conspicuous gallantry and intrepidity in action at the risk of his life above and beyond the call of duty. While leading the 3d Platoon, Company A, on a flanking maneuver against a superior enemy force, First Lieutenant Karopczyc observed that his lead element was engaged with a small enemy unit along his route. Aware of the importance of quickly pushing through to the main enemy force in order to provide relief for a hard-pressed friendly platoon, he dashed through the intense enemy fire into the open and hurled colored smoke grenades to designate the foe for attack by helicopter gunships. He moved among his men to embolden their advance, and he guided their attack by marking enemy locations with bursts of fire from his own weapon. His forceful leadership quickened the advance, forced the enemy to retreat, and allowed his unit to close with the main hostile force. Continuing the deployment of his platoon, he constantly exposed himself as he ran from man to man to give encouragement and to direct their efforts. A shot from an enemy sniper struck him above the heart but he refused aid for this serious injury, plugging the bleeding wound with his finger until it could be properly dressed. As the enemy strength mounted, he ordered his men to organize a defensive position in and around some abandoned bunkers where he conducted a defense against the increasingly strong enemy attacks. After several hours, a North Vietnamese soldier hurled a hand grenade to within a few feet of First Lieutenant Karopczyc and two other wounded men. Although his position protected him, he leaped up to cover the deadly grenade with a steel helmet. It exploded to drive fragments into First Lieutenant Karopczyc's legs, but his action prevented further injury to the two wounded men. Severely weakened by his multiple wounds, he continued to direct the actions of his men until he succumbed two hours later. First Lieutenant Karopczyc's heroic leadership, unyielding perseverance, and selfless devotion to his men were directly responsible for the successful and spirited action of his platoon throughout the battle and are in keeping with the highest traditions of the United States Army.

== Namesake ==
There is an elementary school in Levittown, New York, which opened in the 1950s, formally named Farmedge Elementary School, which was renamed for Stephen E. Karopczyc. It was originally opened in the 1950s. The building still stands today, but is no longer used as a school, but as administrative offices for education officials. Inside the main entrance, there is a large wall display honoring Lt. Karopczyc. The school is located on Farmedge Road.

Lt. Karopczyc attended Island Trees schools from 1950–56, and Chaminade High School from 1957 until his graduation in 1961. He is considered a son of Bethpage, New York. There are two plaques honoring his sacrifice at the General Douglas MacArthur High School in Levittown, New York. A sundial memorial to Lt. Karopczyc stands in the Peace Garden, outside Sodality Chapel at Spring Hill College.

At American Legion Post 1711 in Levittown, NY on March 10, 2018, a statue dedicated to Lt. Karopczyc was dedicated to his service.

== See also ==
- List of Medal of Honor recipients
- List of Medal of Honor recipients for the Vietnam War
