= Howie Vogts =

American football coach

Howard C. Vogts (December 8, 1929 – August 7, 2010) was an American football coach. He became the winningest high school football coach in New York State history on November 16, 2000. On that night, his team, the Bethpage Golden Eagles, defeated Glen Cove by a score of 16-15 in the Nassau County Conference III Championship game played at Hofstra University. The record was previously held by Johnny Barnes of Canisius High School in Buffalo, who had 287 wins from 1931 to 1973.

== Biography ==
Coach Vogts first came to Bethpage in 1952, after graduating from Adelphi University in Garden City, New York. Vogts started the football program at Bethpage High School in the fall of 1952, when he was 21 years old. In their first season, Bethpage played a freshman schedule at the new school. In 1953, Bethpage had a predominantly junior varsity schedule. However, on September 30, 1953, the Golden Eagles played their first varsity football game against St. Dominic's and lost 13-0. In 1954, Bethpage became a full-fledged varsity program. On Saturday, October 2, 1954, the Golden Eagles recorded the first varsity win when they defeated Wantagh (at Bethpage), 20-7, in the season opener. Then Athletic Director, "Howie" (in conjunction with the late Hugh Coyle, former school board member) set up the "Quarterback Club" in 1955-56, now known as the "Dads' Club".

== Coaching career ==
Vogts has been the head varsity football coach every year from 1953 to 2007 except for 1966, when he was on sabbatical and was an assistant coach at Michigan State University. In 1966–67, he and his wife Carolyn took mutual sabbatical leaves from their respective educational fields and went to Michigan State University to work on doctoral degrees, he in administration, and she in pupil personnel services. While there, Vogts had the good fortune to work with Duffy Daugherty, head football coach at MSU, as the Spartans tied for national championship with Notre Dame. After his one-year stint at Michigan State, Vogts returned to Bethpage despite opportunities to coach college football. In Coach Vogts' 52 years as the head coach at Bethpage his teams have a record of 342-114-10.

Under Vogts' direction, the Golden Eagles have made the Nassau County playoffs 25 times since in 1970, and every year since the playoff system expanded to four teams in 1984. Vogts' teams have won 29 regular season league or Conference Championships, 13 Conference Playoff Championships (ten since 1984), three Rutgers Cups, and five Long Island titles. Bethpage has had one Thorp Award winner, Dennis Macholz in 1968. Coach Vogts has had 39 winning seasons, only nine losing seasons, and three .500 seasons. In Vogts' first 23 seasons (1953–1976) his teams were 96-75-7 for a winning percentage of .557. Since then (1977–2005), Vogts' teams have had a Nassau County record 30 consecutive winning seasons, with an astonishing record of 246-39-3 (.865 winning percentage). Under Coach Vogts' helm he coached many stellar athletes who have gone on to play college football like Craig Swanson, John Beachy and Dennis Macholz in addition to coaching many athletes that have gone on to play collegiate lacrosse like Trevor Michaelsen who holds and ties three Long Island Kicking Records with the (Most PAT's in a game 8, most PAT's Season 56, and most career PAT's 88) and many more great athletes.

== History ==
The football field at Bethpage High School was named after Vogts in 1989 and in 1995 Vogts was named Nassau Coach of the Year. The field now rests as synthetic turf with stadium lights surrounding the field.

== Record books ==
On October 12, 2002, Vogts became the first high school football coach in New York State with 300 wins as Bethpage defeated Lynbrook, 37-0. In April 2005, Vogts was nominated as one of eight finalists for the National Football Coach of the Year honors given by the National High School Athletic Coaches Association. On November 10, 2007, Vogts extended his winning record to 350 wins as Bethpage defeated Plainedge 44-6.

== Death ==
He died of congestive heart failure on August 7, 2010, at Mercy Hospital in Rockville Centre.
