= Francis S. Gabreski Airport =

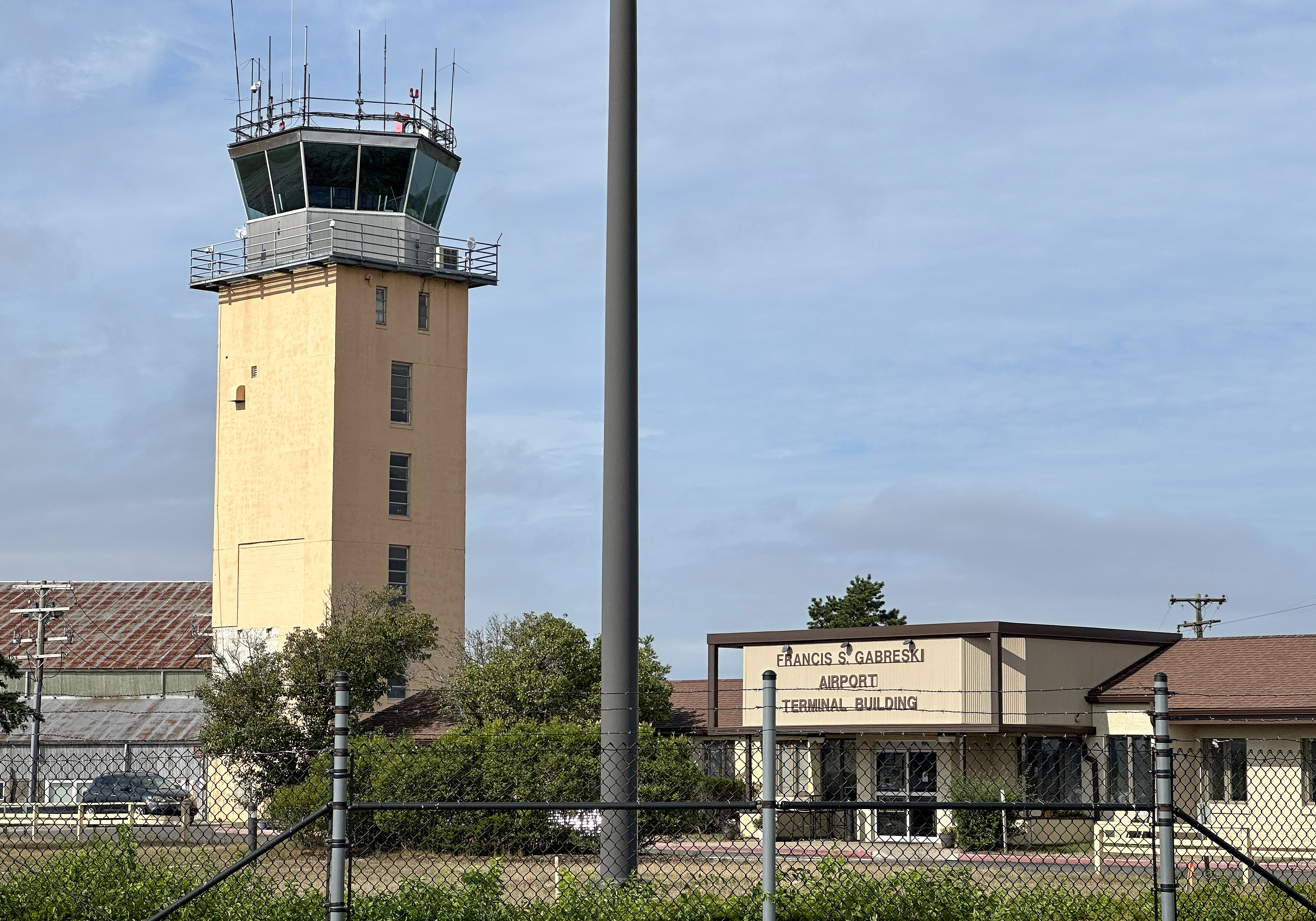
- ATC tower & terminal
- IATA: FOK; ICAO: KFOK; FAA LID: FOK

Summary
- Airport type: Public / military (ANG)
- Owner: County of Suffolk
- Serves: Westhampton Beach, New York
- Elevation AMSL: 66 ft (20 m)
- Coordinates: 40°50′37″N 072°37′54″W
- Website: suffolkcountyny.gov

Maps
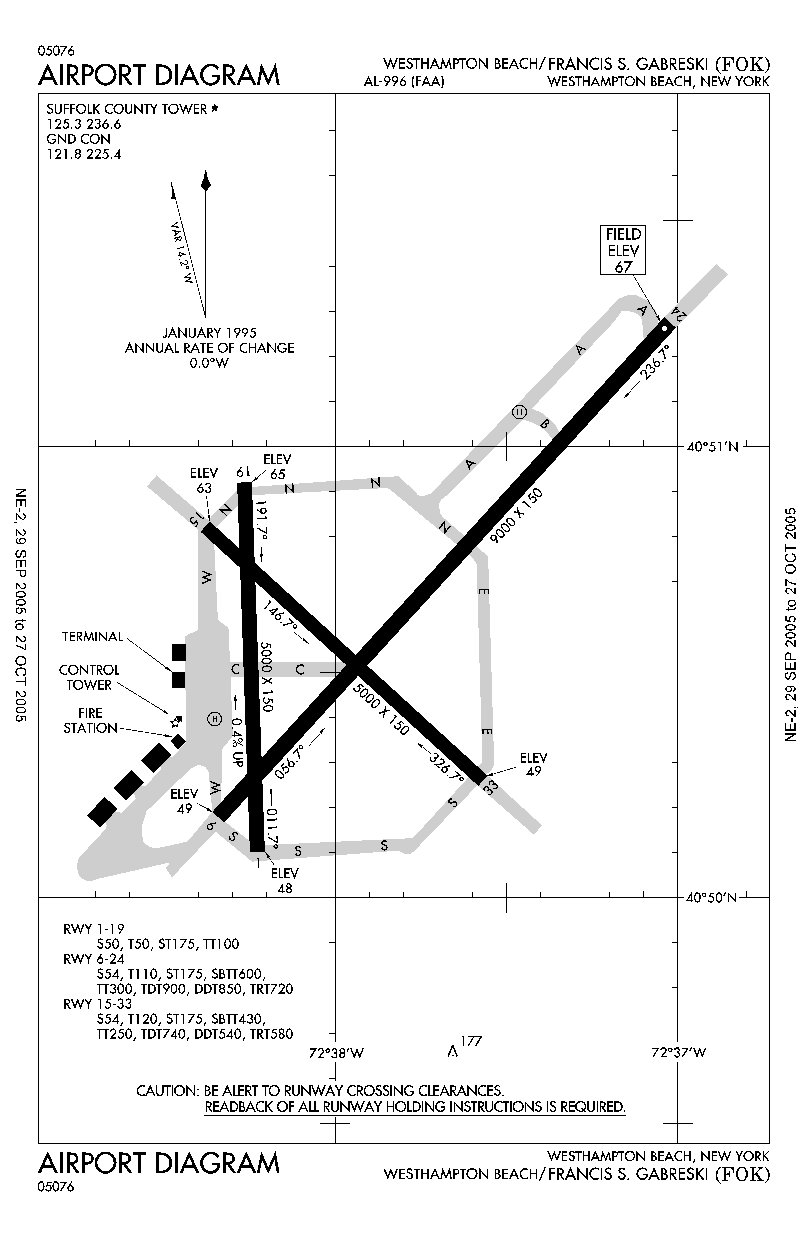
- FAA airport diagram
- Interactive map of Francis S. Gabreski Airport

Runways
Direction	Length		Surface
Direction	ft	m	Surface
6/24	9,002	2,744	Asphalt/concrete
1/19	5,100	1,554	Asphalt/concrete
15/33	5,002	1,525	Asphalt

Statistics (2023)
- Aircraft operations: 50,156
- Based aircraft: 85
- Source: Federal Aviation Administration

Francis S. Gabreski Airport (IATA: FOK, ICAO: KFOK, FAA LID: FOK) is a county-owned, joint civil-military airport located 3 nautical miles (6 km) north of the central business district of Westhampton Beach, in Suffolk County, New York, United States. It is approximately 80 miles (130 km) east of New York City, on Long Island.

Known as Suffolk County Air Force Base until 1969, then Suffolk County Airport until 1991, when it was renamed in honor of Colonel Francis S. Gabreski, USAF (Retired), a U.S. Army Air Forces flying ace in World War II who, as a U.S. Air Force officer, was later the commander of the 52nd Fighter-Interceptor Wing at Suffolk County Air Force Base from 1964 through November 1967, when he retired.

The airport is both a general aviation facility utilized by corporate businesses, private aviation and air taxi services, and an Air National Guard (ANG) base for the 106th Rescue Wing (106 RQW), an Air Combat Command (ACC)-gained unit of the New York Air National Guard.

== History ==
=== Suffolk County Army Air Field ===
The Suffolk County Army Air Field was built in 1943 as a United States Army Air Forces sub-base of nearby Mitchel Field. Later assigned to First Air Force, the 437th Army Air Force Base Unit defended the New York City area and flew antisubmarine patrols. Post-war, the airfield was conveyed to Suffolk County for use as a civilian airport, but included a reversal clause if future military use was ever needed.

=== Suffolk County Air Force Base ===
Renamed when the United States Air Force reclaimed the airport in 1951, Suffolk County Air Force Base was part of the Eastern Air Defense Force's defense of the New York City metropolitan area. The Air National Guard's 103rd Fighter-Interceptor Wing (103 FIW), along with the 118th Fighter-Interceptor Squadron and its F-47N Thunderbolts, was federalized on March 2, 1951, and moved from Brainard Field, Connecticut, to Suffolk County AFB on June 1. The 103 FIW was returned to state control on February 6, 1952, and remained briefly at Suffolk County until replaced by the 45th and 75th Fighter-Interceptor Squadrons in November 1952, flying the F-86 Sabre as part of the 23rd Fighter-Interceptor Group (23 FIG).

In 1955, the 23 FIG was reassigned to Presque Isle Air Force Base, Maine and replaced by the newly activated 52nd Fighter-Interceptor Wing (52 FIW), which flew under various designations from Suffolk County AFB until 1969, with the 2d and 5th Fighter-Interceptor Squadrons flying F-94 Starfire, F-101 Voodoo and F-102 Delta Dagger interceptors. In 1963, the 52 FIW was renamed the 52nd Fighter Wing (Air Defense) and became part of the New York Air Defense Sector (NY ADS), the NY ADS being one of four USAF air defense sectors employing the Semi-Automatic Ground Environment (SAGE) system.

Suffolk County AFB was also the main support base for the Suffolk County Missile Annex, a nearby USAF CIM-10 Bomarc surface-to-air missile launch complex for the defense of the New York City metropolitan area under the control of a missile launch control center at McGuire Air Force Base, New Jersey.

As a result of funding shortfalls for the Vietnam War that resulted in the closure of numerous stateside air force bases and naval air stations, Suffolk County AFB deactivated in 1969 and the military installation was again transferred to the Suffolk County government for use as a civilian airport.

=== Suffolk County Airport/Air National Guard Base and Francis S. Gabreski Airport/Air National Guard Base ===
Suffolk County Airport (Francis S. Gabreski Airport after 1991) operated as a civilian general aviation airport without a military unit from 1969 until 1970.

Military operations were reintroduced in June 1970 when the 102nd Air Refueling Squadron (102 AREFS) of the 106th Air Refueling Group (106 ARG), New York Air National Guard, relocated to Suffolk County with their KC-97 Stratofreighters after the closing of Naval Air Station Floyd Bennett Field. In 1972, the unit's mission changed from air refueling to fighter-interceptor, with the new mission of controlling the skies along the northeast U.S. coast with F-102 Delta Dagger aircraft.

In 1975, the designation and mission changed again to "Aerospace Rescue and Recovery", later shortened to "Air Rescue" and then simply "Rescue". The current names of the 102nd Rescue Squadron (102 RQS) and 106th Rescue Wing (106 RQW) were assigned in 1995. Today, the 106 RQW provides peacetime and combat search and rescue services using HC-130J Hercules aircraft and HH-60W Pave Hawk helicopters. The rescue wing was featured in the book and movie of The Perfect Storm which details the crash of one of the wing's HH-60G Pave Hawk rescue helicopters while conducting search and rescue operations from the airport during the 1991 Perfect Storm.

Air Force One was also often located at the Air National Guard base in the summers of 1998 and 1999 during weeklong visits by President Bill Clinton and First Lady Hillary Clinton during extended stays at the Georgica Pond home of film director Steven Spielberg in East Hampton, New York.

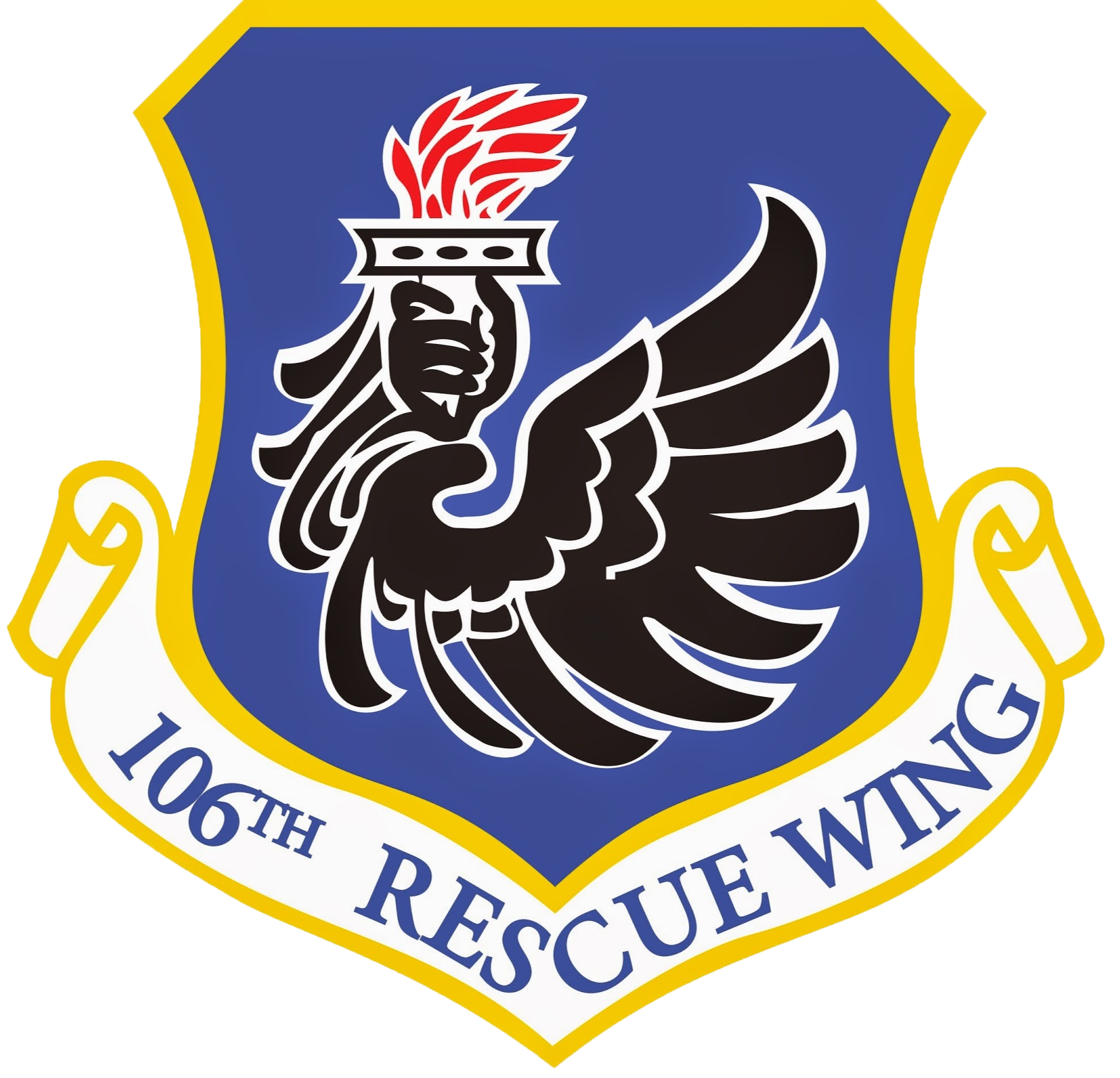

== Facilities and aircraft ==
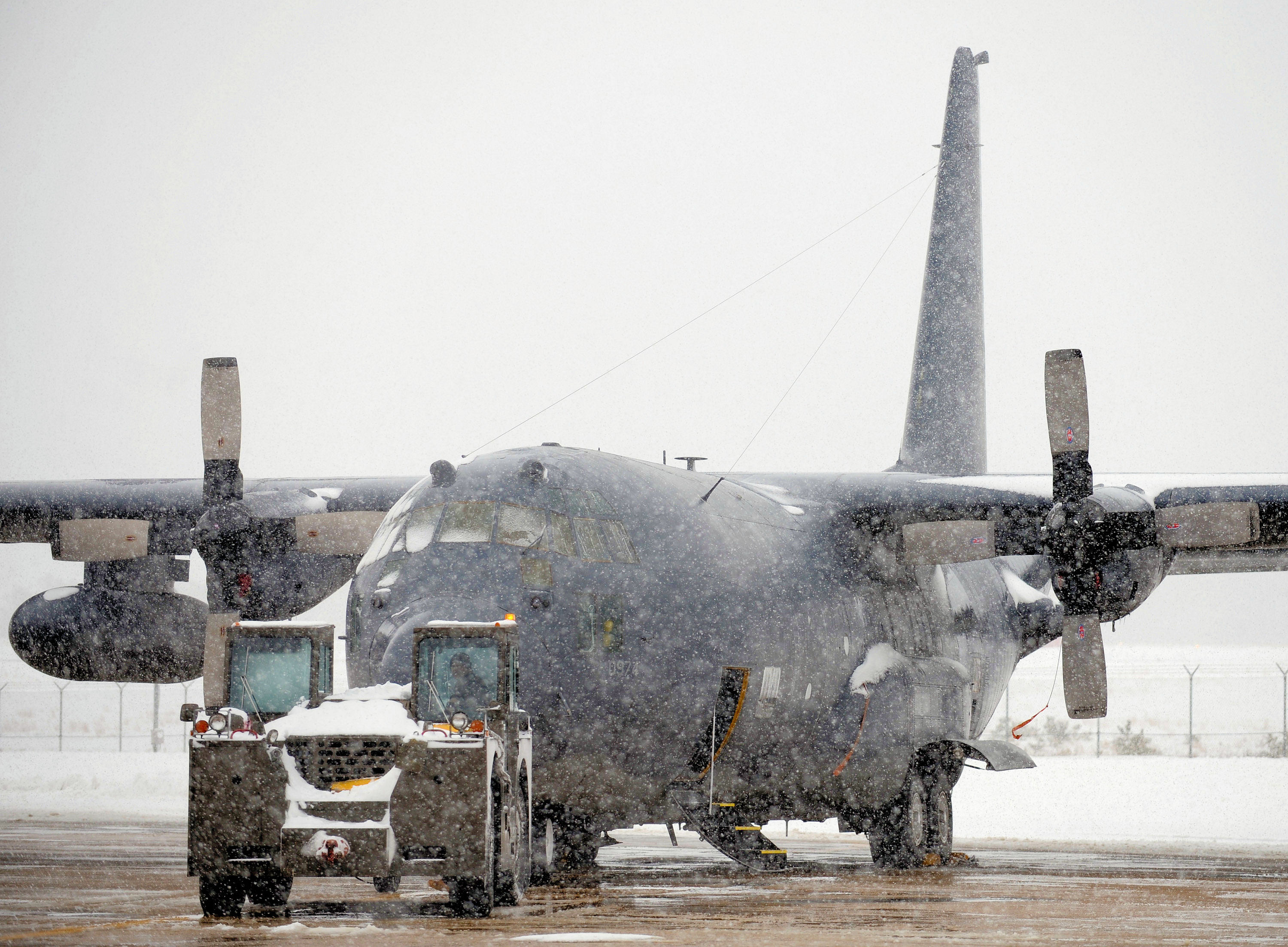
An HC-130 at the airport in 2010.

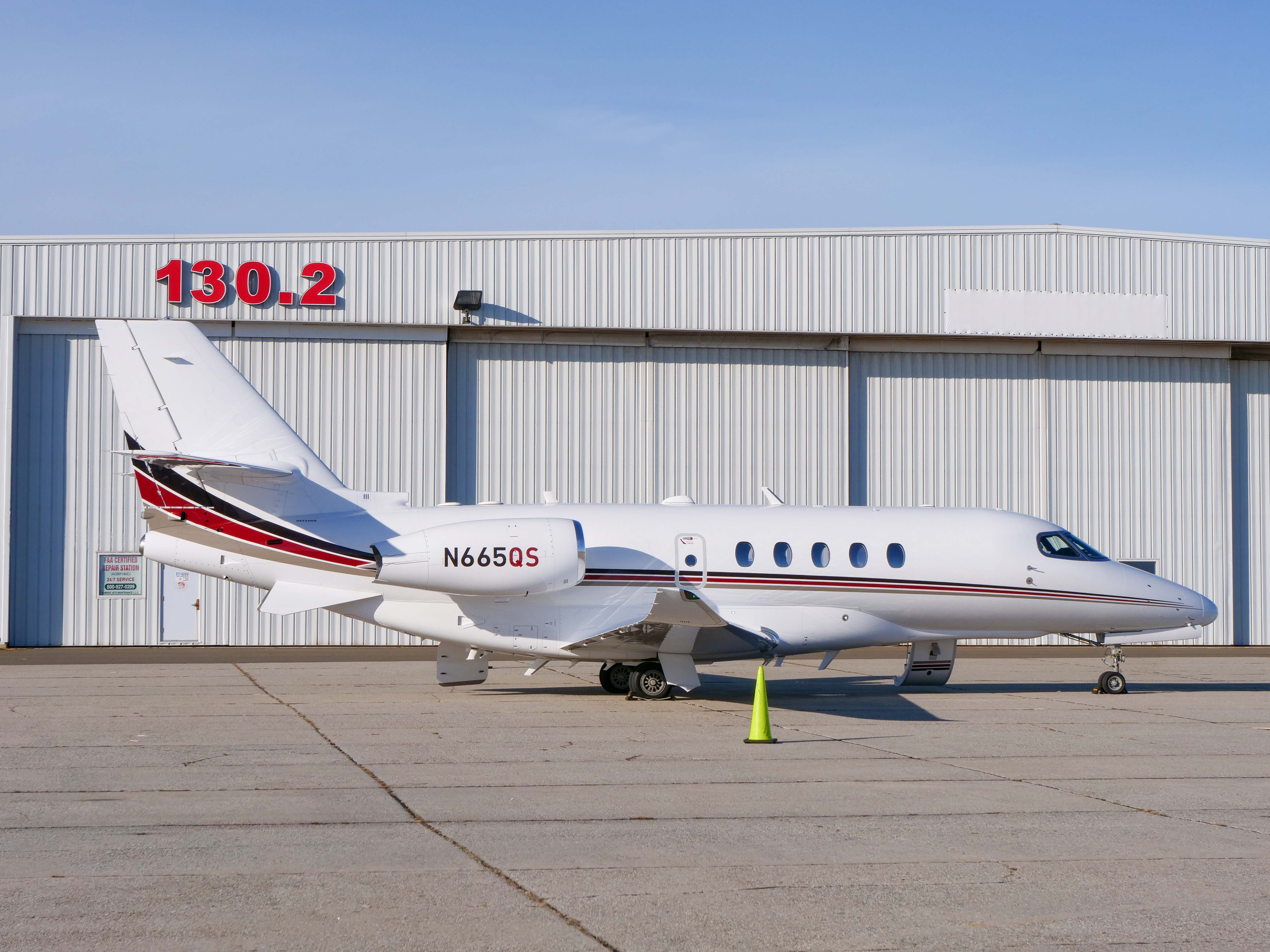
One of NetJets many Citation Latitude's ready to board at the airport

Although given a Westhampton Beach ZIP Code (11978), the airport is located just outside Westhampton Beach Village limits, in an unincorporated area in the Town of Southampton.

Gabreski Airport covers an area of 1,451 acres (587 ha) which contains three paved runways. Runway 6/24 measures 9,002 x 150 ft (2,744 x 46 m), making it among New York's longest after JFK International Airport and Stewart International Airport. The airport has two additional runways (1/19 and 15/33), 1/19 measuring 5,100 x 150 ft (1,524 x 46 m) and 15/33 measuring 5,002 x 150 ft (1,525 x 46).

For the 12-month period ending December 31, 2023, the airport had 50,156 aircraft operations, an average of 137 per day: 69% general aviation, 19% air taxi, and 12% military. At that time there were 85 aircraft based at this airport: 57 single-engine, 2 multi-engine, 7 jet, 8 helicopter, and 11 military.

As of September 2022, one fixed-base operator provides services to airport users: Modern Aviation. It is the only FBO operation at the airport, with its predecessor, Sheltair, having bought Malloy Air East in early 2014.

The Suffolk County Police Aviation Section bases a Law Enforcement and MEDEVAC helicopter at the airport. The base is staffed from 7AM to 11PM by two police officer pilots as well as a flight paramedic employed by Stony Brook University Hospital. The airport is patrolled by the Suffolk County Sheriff's Office.

== Accidents and incidents ==
- On August 11, 2010, Air Force Two, which was departing Gabreski Airport for Washington, D.C. with then-Vice President Joseph R. Biden, Jr. on board, caused damage to an unoccupied Piper Cub at the airport while taxiing, due to the large plane's jet blast. There were no injuries, but the left wing of the Piper received damage.
- On February 26, 2017, a plane bound for the airport crashed into the nearby woods, subsequently catching fire. The pilot was critically injured and the two passengers were killed.
- On October 13, 2018, a Piper PA-28 bound for Charleston, South Carolina from Danbury Municipal Airport in Danbury, Connecticut crashed into the Atlantic Ocean approximately 3 miles (4.8 km) south-southeast of Gabreski Airport. All three people on board were killed.

== See also ==
- List of airports in New York
- New York World War II Army airfields
- Walking Figure (2014)
