= Church of Bethphage =

Franciscan church in Jerusalem

Coordinates: 31.77725°N 35.25093°E

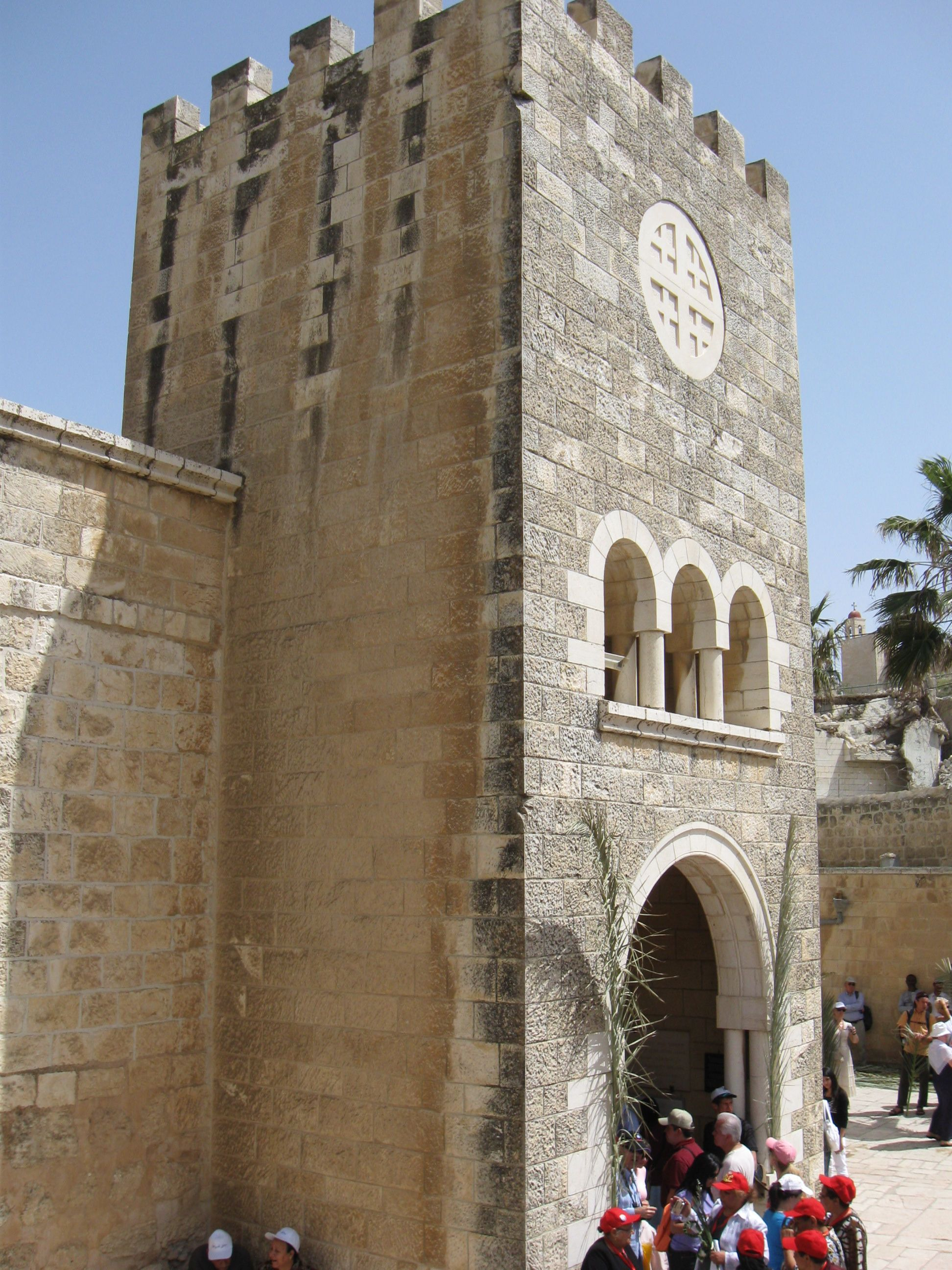
Sanctuary entrance

The Church of Bethphage, also spelled Beitphage, meaning "house of the unripe figs", is a Franciscan church on the Mount of Olives outside historical Jerusalem. It contains a stone traditionally identified as the one which Jesus used to mount the donkey at the start of his triumphal entry into Jerusalem. The church, part of a monastery, is now located in at-Tur, a neighborhood of East Jerusalem.

== History ==
In the time of Jesus, the ancient village of Bethphage stood between Bethany to the east and Jerusalem. It was built beside the steep road that descended from the Mount of Olives eastwards towards the ancient village of Bethany (today's el-Azariyeh) and continued toward Jericho. A Spanish pilgrim from the end of the 14th century, Brother Jeronimo of Merida, informs us that the village had ceased to exist by that time. Today it is part of the at-Tur neighbourhood of Jerusalem.

There have been several churches at the site from the 4th century onwards.

During the 4th century, a Byzantine shrine commemorating the meeting between Lazarus' sister Martha and Jesus stood at the site.

A Crusader chapel is mentioned by Western sources of the 12th century, but not anymore in the following century, the presumption being that it was destroyed in the context of the 1187 capture of Jerusalem by Saladin. This chapel stood on the foundations of the 4th-century shrine.

The modern church, built in 1883, rests on the foundations of the Crusader chapel and received its current outlook after the restoration works finalised in 1954. Architect Antonio Barluzzi designed a Romanesque-style church tower, built during the 1954 renovations.

In 1867, a cube-shaped stone was discovered. This stone, now called the Stele of Bethphage, was an integral part of the 12th-century Crusader chapel and now lies near the northern wall of the church. The stele, covered in plaster, was decorated by the Crusaders and contains Latin inscriptions describing biblical events which occurred in the area of Jerusalem and Bethphage. In 1950 the decorations on the stone were restored, and in 1955, frescos were drawn on the walls and ceiling of the sanctuary. Today, as in the 12th century, pilgrims hold a Palm Sunday procession which begins at the Bethphage Church.

== Layout and decoration ==
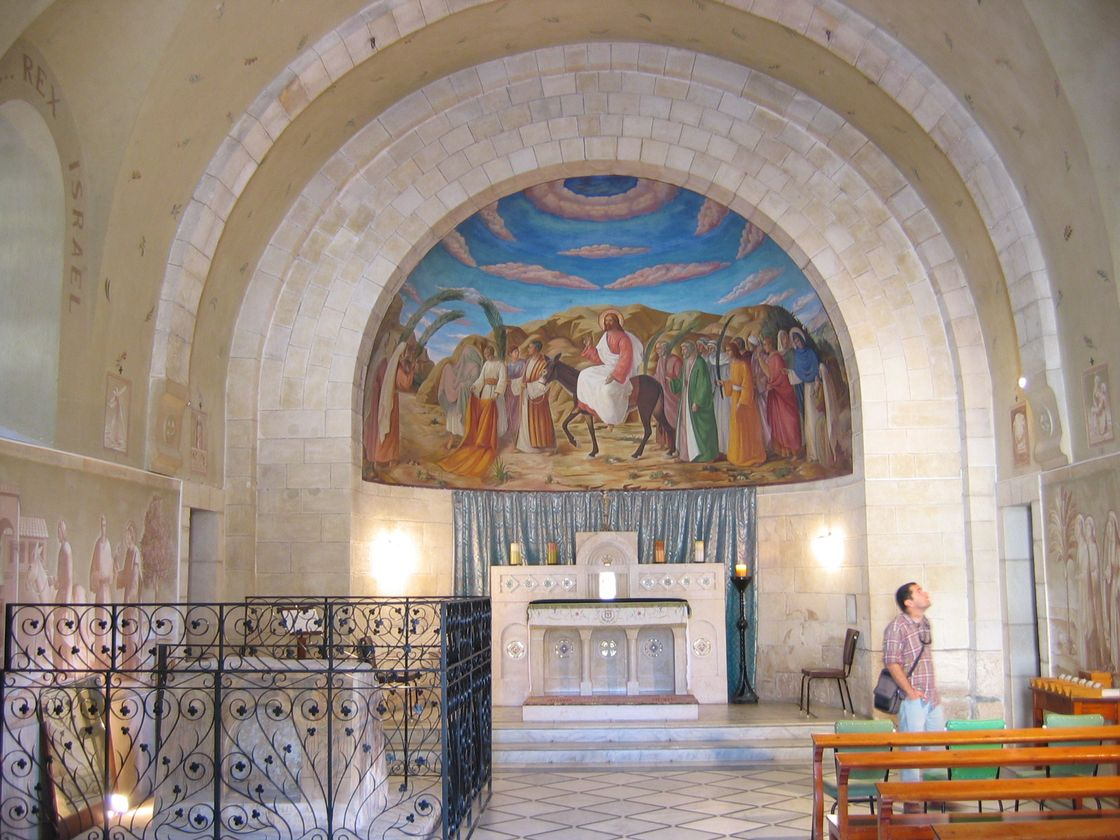
Inside view with Stele of Bethphage (left, behind railing) and altar apse

Foundations from the crusader chapel can easily be seen near the floor of the apse. Behind the altar is a fresco depicting Jesus riding a donkey to the Temple, accompanied by his disciples.

The church ceiling features drawings of flowers and leaves. Colored in shades of brown, the wall frescos portray New Testament-era people preparing for the procession. On one wall a group of rabbis hold a scroll which contains the second part of the verse from (John 12:19). Written in Latin around the windows are the words which the people said about Jesus during the procession into the city.

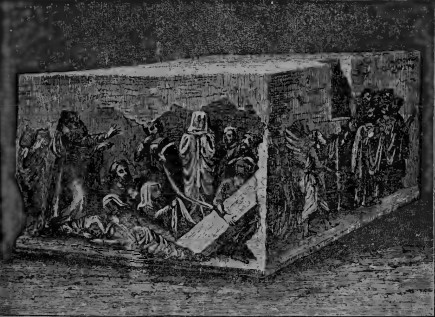
Stele of Bethphage, etching published in 1877

The main focus of the church is the Stele of Bethphage, which is set apart by wrought iron railings. There is a mirror behind the stone so that visitors can easily see the drawings on all four sides. The drawings depict the meeting between Jesus and Martha: two disciples bringing Jesus an ass and a colt, Lazarus rising from the dead, and on the side facing the altar, a drawing of a crowd of people holding palm branches.
