= Donald Baechler =

American painter and sculptor (1956–2022)

- portrait of Donald Edward Baechler by Daniel Oh
- Born: November 22, 1956; Hartford, Connecticut, U.S.
- Died: April 4, 2022 (aged 65); New York City, New York, U.S.
- Education: Maryland Institute College of Art; Cooper Union; Städelschule
- Known for: Painting, assemblage
- Movement: Neo-expressionism

Donald Baechler (November 22, 1956 – April 4, 2022) was an American painter and sculptor associated with 1980s Neo-expressionism. He had lived in Manhattan and Stephentown, New York.

== Early life and education ==
Baechler was born in Hartford, Connecticut, to parents Marjorie (née Dolliver), a journalist and quilter, and Henry Jules Baechler, an accountant. He was one of four children raised in a Quaker family. Baechler was interested in art at a young age, after his mother died, and started painting in collaboration with his maternal grandmother, who was a painter. He attended Westtown School, a Quaker private school, for his last three years of high school. Westtown had an effective art department, and while at Westtown Baechler determined to be an artist.

Baechler attended the Maryland Institute College of Art from 1974 to 1977, studying for his B.F.A. in Painting, and Cooper Union from 1977 to 1978 for his M.F.A. Dissatisfied with New York City, he proceeded to the Staatliche Hochschule für Bildende Künste Städelschule in Frankfurt am Main, Germany.

"At Cooper Union I met some German exchange students. This was 1977, and I found the whole scene at the school to be white and boring, to be honest. It wasn't what I wanted out of art school or what I wanted out of being in New York. The most interesting minds, the most interesting talents and energy came from those German kids. And they said, 'Why don't you come to Germany?' The easiest school to get into was the one attached to the Frankfurt Museum. The entrance requirements were less strict, so I went with it and spent a year in Frankfurt. They were very generous."

Baechler returned to New York City in 1980, working as a guard at Walter De Maria's New York Earth Room.

In February 1981, he worked for a month as a studio assistant for the artist Joseph Glasco and profited from working with Glasco or at least shared some of his attitudes. Baechler’s early collage and black and white works were influenced by the collage painting techniques Glasco was using at that time.

He was soon a part of a burgeoning Lower Manhattan arts scene, showing in the East Village and exhibition spaces such as Artists Space and the Drawing Center. Baechler and Tony Shafrazi struck up an acquaintance over a shared interest in artist Joseph Kosuth. Shafrazi was developing an interest in graffiti-oriented works, and founded a downtown gallery that represented Baechler, Keith Haring, Kenny Scharf, and eventually Jean-Michel Basquiat. In a 2000 interview, Baechler said:

"Tony obviously had some grander vision about what was going on and decided that it wasn't the end of conceptualism, but the beginning of something else. I never felt entirely comfortable showing my work there because it had nothing to do with what Keith and Kenny Scharf were doing. I wasn't part of this downtown club scene, and I had nothing to do with so-called graffiti art ... I always used to tell people, 'I'm an abstract artist before anything else,' For me, it's always been more about line, form, balance and the edge of the canvas—all these silly formalist concerns—than it has been about subject matter or narrative or politics."

Baechler's early work was noted for childlike imagery and thematics—associations which recurred throughout his career. "Like Art Brut," wrote Steven Vincent in Art in America, "Donald Baechler's seemingly ingenuous depictions of everyday objects and simple figures succeed in large part by tapping into our nostalgia for childhood, that period of life before the rivening onset of self-consciousness and guilt. It's a myth, of course: children are hardly angelic, and alienation is the state of humanity—while Beachler's art works hard to achieve its trademark appearance of prelapsarian sincerity and artlessness."

== Art and context ==
Baechler's source material drew broadly from classical art history, the New York School, contemporary art, folk art, outsider art, pop culture, and childhood. Grace Glueck of The New York Times noted "echoes of Rauschenberg, Warhol, Lichtenstein," while Edward Leffingwell of Art in America characterized Baechler's approach as "some strange and uncompromising posture out of Otterness and Rodin."

Holland Cotter of The New York Times described a 1993 exhibition at Sperone Westwater Gallery: "Mr. Baechler jams together pages from children's copy books, maps of Africa and Europe, sketches of toys (beach balls, building blocks) and the reiterated form—emphatic and phallic—of an upheld thumb. In one drawing several thumbs fill the inside of an outlined head, perhaps giving a clue to the darker undercurrents in Mr. Baechler's work as a whole. Art, like play, he seems to suggest, is just a method for keeping chaos at bay, and these days even the best-behaved child knows he's under somebody's thumb." Playing cars, fortune cookies, a ceramic onion, flowers, ice-cream cones, even a visual play on Mr. Bill of Saturday Night Live, little escaped Baechler's image bank, which is a literal collection.

"I hold onto absolutely everything," said the artist. "I would guess out of every thousand images I save, I probably use one or two. I've never actually counted. I save images in many different forms; I save them in endless file cabinets. I have slide binders with thousands and thousands of slides that I work from. But most of the things I photograph never find their way into a painting; and most of the things I save and catalog and photocopy never really find their way into a work. It's necessary to accumulate all of these things to get to the point of what's important."

Widely regarded as a painter, Baechler's three-dimensional work has been correlated to the sculptural works of Roy Lichtenstein, Alex Katz, and Carroll Dunham. Baechler long experimented with a variety of forms and materials, always maintaining what has been dubbed his "gee-whiz approach." Alex Hawgood, in a 2008 profile in The New York Times, summarized ...."Baechler ... is known for his sunny, multimedia work that explores the language of cultural symbols."

But Baechler's "animated, engaging and ... beautifully made" images are not without sentiment. "Baechler," wrote Edward Leffingwell of Art in America, "scatters his surfaces with the detritus of childhood, portraying the adult today through the images of a past not quite left behind." And neither is Baechler outside the purview of art history. The New York Times' art critic Holland Cotter remarked of Baechler: "At this very moment, some industrious doctoral student somewhere is documenting how thoroughly images of childhood have pervaded art of the late 1980s and early 90s. The images aren't chiefly those of adolescence, as was the case with Pop Art in the 60s, but of infancy."

The restaurant Caravaggio on the Upper East Side of Manhattan exhibits two paintings and a sculpture by Baechler.

== Death and legacy ==
Baechler died of a heart attack on April 4, 2022, at the age of 65.

Baechler's artwork is in various permanent museum collections including at the Whitney Museum of American Art, the Museum of Modern Art, Solomon R. Guggenheim Museum, the Museum of Fine Arts Boston, the Stedelijk, and the Centre Pompidou.

== See also ==
- Walking Figure (2014)
