= FourLeaf Air Show =

Annual American air show

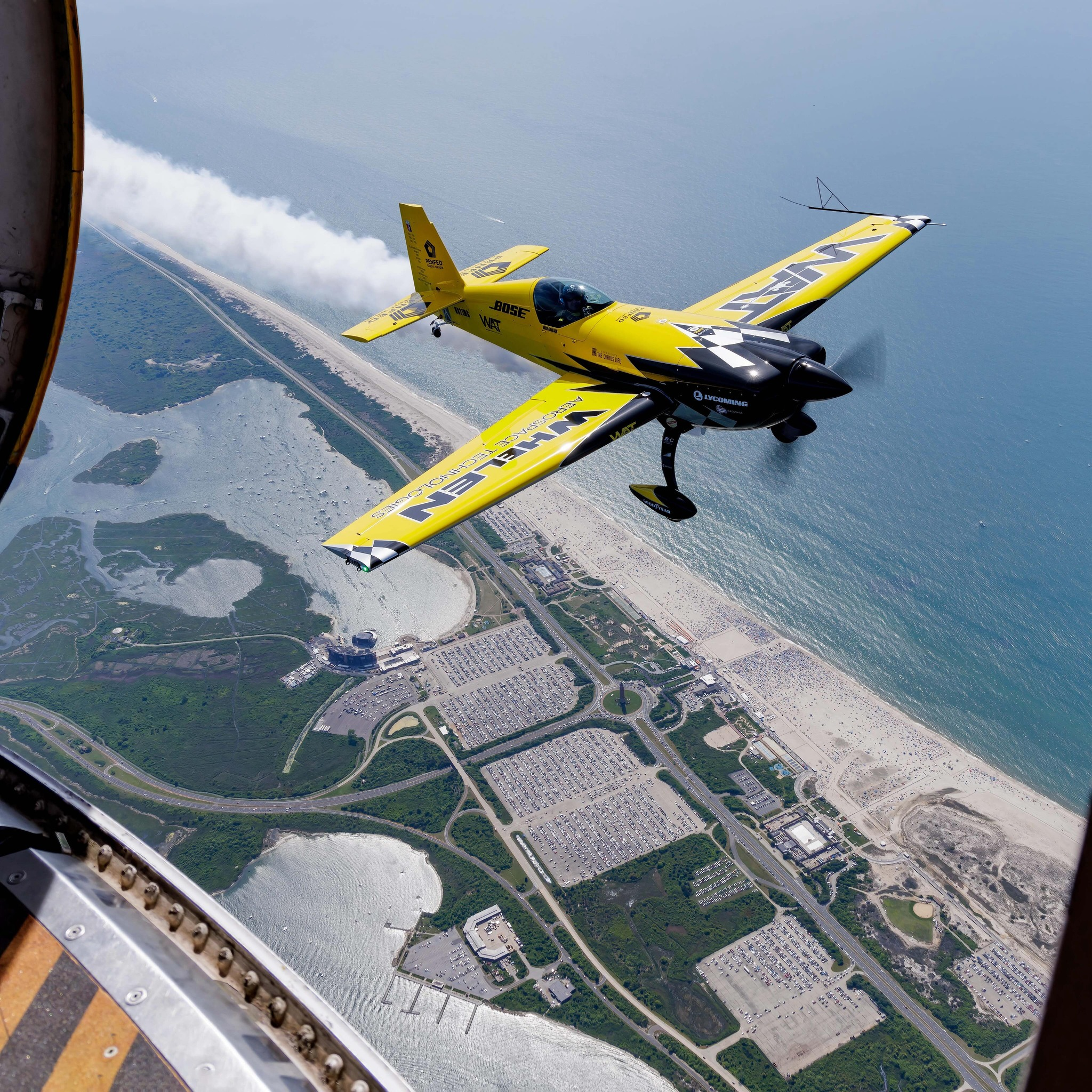
- The Army Golden Knights aircraft flying above Long Island at the 20th Anniversary show in 2024.
- Genre: Beach display air show
- Dates: Memorial Day Weekend
- Frequency: Annually
- Venue: Republic Airport; Francis S. Gabreski Airport
- Locations: Jones Beach State Park; Wantagh, New York
- Coordinates: 40°36′51″N 73°32′10″W
- Country: United States
- Attendance: Over 459,000 (2024)
- Major events: Aerobatic Displays
- Website: fourleafairshow.com

The FourLeaf Air Show (formerly known as the Bethpage Air Show), began in 2004 and has become a significant tradition featuring performances by military and civilian aerobatic teams. The FourLeaf Air Show is an annual American air show held each May on Memorial Day weekend. It is staged in the airspace above and off the coast of Jones Beach State Park in Wantagh, New York, located on Long Island. It is a family-friendly event that showcases the importance of paying tribute to people who have served in the US Armed Forces, especially in the air.

The air show is typically headlined by either the United States Navy Blue Angels or United States Air Force Thunderbirds. The event is free to the public, with a standard $10 parking fee collected upon entry. In 2024, over 459,000 people attended the 20th-anniversary air show during the three-day period, making it the most highly attended air show to date.

In March of 2025, Bethpage Federal Credit Union rebranded to FourLeaf Federal Credit Union (“FourLeaf”). With this, the Bethpage Air Show is now known as the FourLeaf Air Show.
