= Fairfield Properties Ballpark =

Baseball park in Central Islip, New York

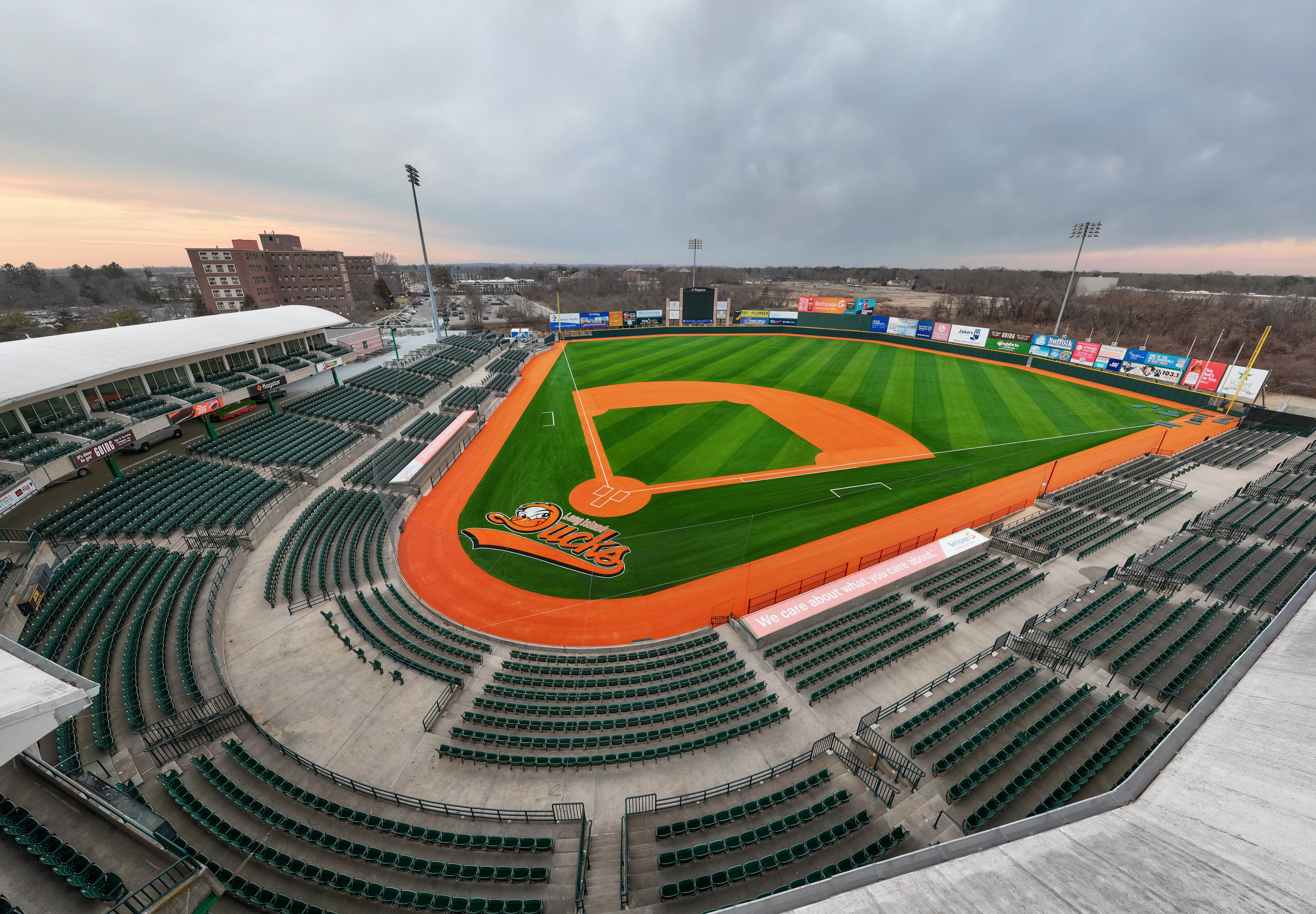

- Location within New York Location within the United States
- Interactive map of Fairfield Properties Ballpark
- Former names: Bethpage Ballpark (2010–2020); Suffolk County Sports Park (2010); Citibank Park (2001–2010); EAB Park (2000–2001)
- Address: 3 Court House Drive; Central Islip, New York 11722
- Coordinates: 40°45′54″N 73°11′32″W
- Operator: Long Island Ducks
- Capacity: 6,002
- Surface: FieldTurf
- Field size: Left Field: 325 feet (99 m); Center Field: 400 feet (120 m); Right Field: 325 feet (99 m)

Construction
- Groundbreaking: April 1999
- Opened: April 28, 2000
- Architects: Beatty Harvey Associates; HNTB Sports Architecture

Tenants
- Long Island Ducks (ALPB) (2000–present); Long Island Lizards (MLL) (2001)

Fairfield Properties Ballpark is a 6,002-seat baseball park in Central Islip, New York that serves as the home of the Long Island Ducks. This independent professional baseball team is a member of the Atlantic League of Professional Baseball. The Ducks played their first regular-season game on April 28, 2000, hosting the Nashua Pride. The game marked the Ducks' first game, as they entered the Atlantic League that season. Fairfield Properties Ballpark hosted the 2002, 2010, and 2018 Atlantic League All-Star Games.

== Naming rights ==
The stadium was initially named EAB Park, after European American Bank. On July 17, 2001, Citigroup acquired EAB, resulting in a name change from EAB Park to Citibank Park. Citigroup ended its corporate sponsorship in the spring of 2010 and the ballpark was given the temporary name Suffolk County Sports Park for the 2010 season.

On December 15, 2010, Suffolk County officials agreed to a $2.1 million deal with Bethpage Federal Credit Union (later renamed FourLeaf Federal Credit Union) to name the stadium Bethpage Ballpark until the 2020 season.

On September 1, 2020, Suffolk County officials signed an agreement with the Long Island-based Fairfield Properties for $7 million over 15 years. When the Bethpage naming rights ended in December 2020, the official name changed to Fairfield Properties Ballpark.

== Facilities ==
Fairfield Properties Ballpark has a capacity of 6,002 seats, including 20 luxury suites and a 126-seat bar/restaurant. Family attractions, such as an inflatable jump house and an inflatable fast pitch tent, are located on the concourse. Concession stands offer mainly traditional ballpark foods.

== See also ==
- Maimonides Park
- Citi Field
