= Holland Sheltair Aviation Group =

Holland Sheltair Aviation Group is a collective group of companies that provide services to the entire aviation community, but notably the business jet community. Gerald M. Holland founded Holland Builders Inc in 1963, whereas the Sheltair half of the alliance was formed in 1988. The two joined in 2004 to form Holland Sheltair. The majority of the group is located in Florida, with a few other locations in New York and Georgia.

== Companies ==
- Sheltair Aviation Services - The company that provides the actual services.
- Sheltair Aviation Facilities - The company that provides physical space to perform the services.
- Holland Builders Inc - The company that builds the spaces.
