= Bethphage =

Ancient biblical town

Bethphage (Ancient Greek: Βηθφαγή, romanized: Bēthpagḗ; Imperial Aramaic: בֵּית פַּגִּי, romanized: Bêṯ Paggî, lit. 'house of unripe figs') or Bethsphage, is a Christian religious site on the Mount of Olives east of historical Jerusalem, now in the At-Tur neighbourhood of East Jerusalem.

The Synoptic Gospels mention Jesus stopping in Bethphage before his triumphal entry into Jerusalem. There is an annual Catholic Palm Sunday procession into Jerusalem, as there is a Greek Orthodox one (the respective feasts rarely fall on the same day), both beginning in Bethphage.

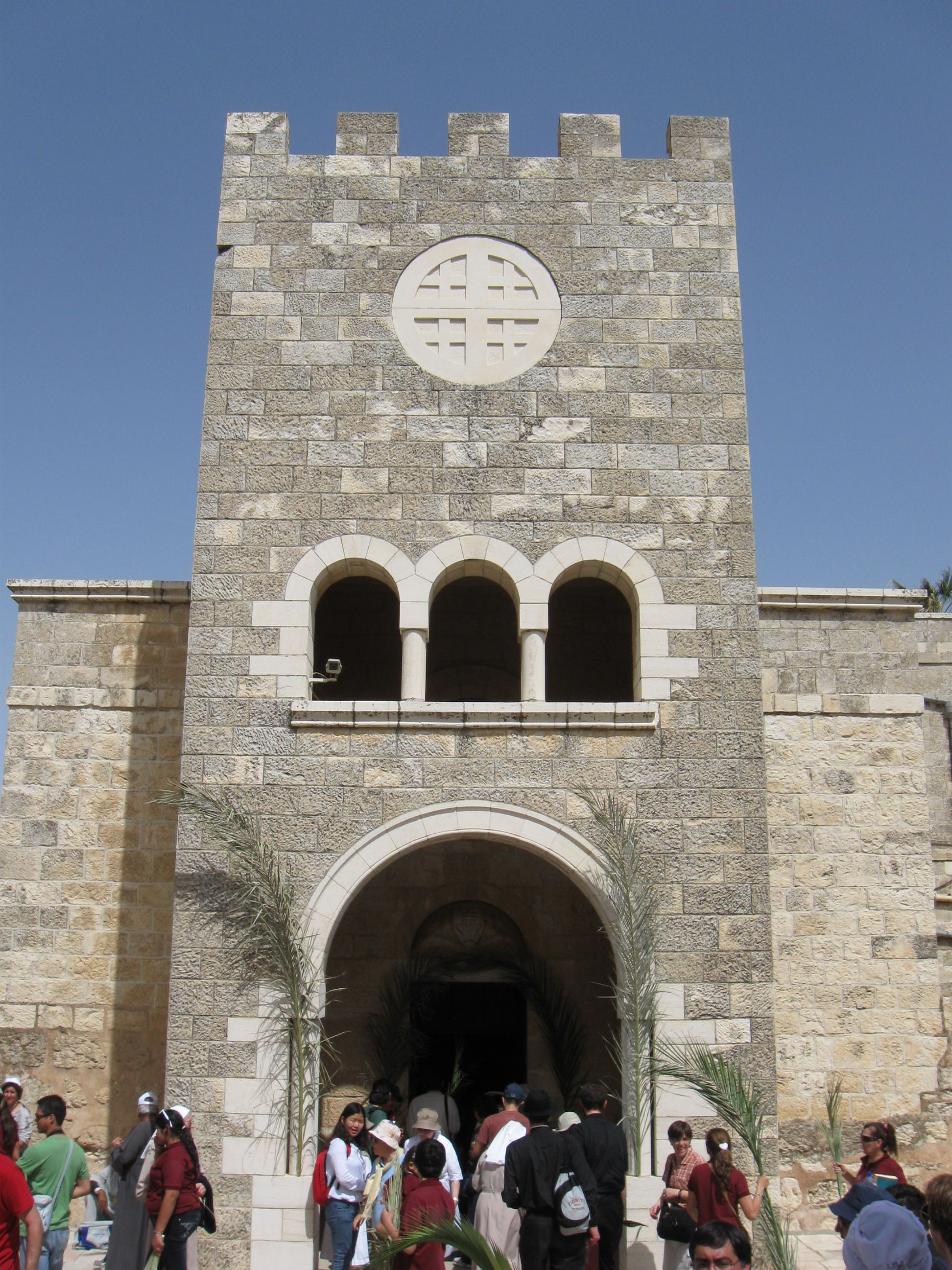
Franciscan Church of Bethphage

== New Testament ==
Bethphage is mentioned in the New Testament as the place in ancient Israel where Jesus sent his disciples to find a colt upon which he would ride into Jerusalem. The Synoptic Gospels mention it as being close to Bethany, where he was staying immediately prior to his triumphal entry into Jerusalem.

Unknown villagers living there, the owners of the colt according to Gospel of Luke 19:33, permitted Jesus' disciples to take the colt away for Jesus' triumphal entry into Jerusalem, which would have been four days before Passover.

== Location ==
Bethphage is located inside at-Tur, a neighbourhood of East Jerusalem, about 2 kilometres (1.2 mi) northwest of the modern village of al-Azariya (ancient Bethany).

Eusebius (Onom 58:13) located it on the Mount of Olives. It was likely on the road from Jerusalem to Jericho and the limit of a Sabbath-day's journey from Jerusalem, i.e., 2,000 cubits.

== Churches and monasteries ==
The Franciscan Church of Bethphage was built on the foundations of a 12th-century crusader chapel. It is officially known as the Church of Palms and is part of the Monastery of the Palms.

The Greek Orthodox Monastery of Palm-bearing Bethphage stands just up the hill from the Catholic church (at 31°46′34″N 35°15′07″E). The Greek Orthodox mark the feast day every year at the site.
