= International Congress of Oral Implantologists =

- Abbreviation: ICOI
- Formation: 1972
- Legal status: Tax-exempt, non-profit professional association
- Headquarters: Fairfied, New Jersey, United States
- Members: Dental surgeons, laboratory technicians, manufacturers, industrial representatives and researchers
- Key people: Dr. Senichi Suzuki (President)
- Volunteers: 25,000
- Website: icoi.org

The International Congress of Oral Implantologists (abbreviated as ICOI) is a tax-exempt, non-profit professional association that renders education, holds seminars and meetings, and encourages research work regarding implantology. Founded in 1972, the association aims at advancing and improving the quality of the practice of dental implant.

Membership of the ICOI is open to dental surgeons, laboratory technicians, manufacturers, industrial representatives and researchers. There are more than 25,000 active members of the association across 65 affiliate societies worldwide. It provides recognition to dentists in the following categories: fellowship, mastership and diplomate. The association publishes a journal twice and a newsletter four times a month. Various scientific symposia are conducted every year by the association with the support of its daughter project Implant Dentistry Research and Education Foundation (IDREF) for fund raising to achieve goals of the association.
