= Naval Weapons Industrial Reserve Plant =

Naval Weapons Industrial Reserve Plant can refer to:

- Naval Weapons Industrial Reserve Plant, Bedford
- Naval Weapons Industrial Reserve Plant, Bethpage
- Naval Weapons Industrial Reserve Plant, Calverton
- Naval Weapons Industrial Reserve Plant, Dallas
- Naval Weapons Industrial Reserve Plant, McGregor
