= Republic Airport =

- The airport, as seen from the air in 2010
- IATA: FRG; ICAO: KFRG; FAA LID: FRG

Summary
- Airport type: Public
- Owner: New York State Department of Transportation
- Operator: AvPORTS
- Serves: Long Island; New York metropolitan area
- Location: East Farmingdale, New York
- Opened: 1928
- Elevation AMSL: 82 ft (25 m)
- Coordinates: 40°43′44″N 073°24′48″W
- Website: republicairport.net

Maps
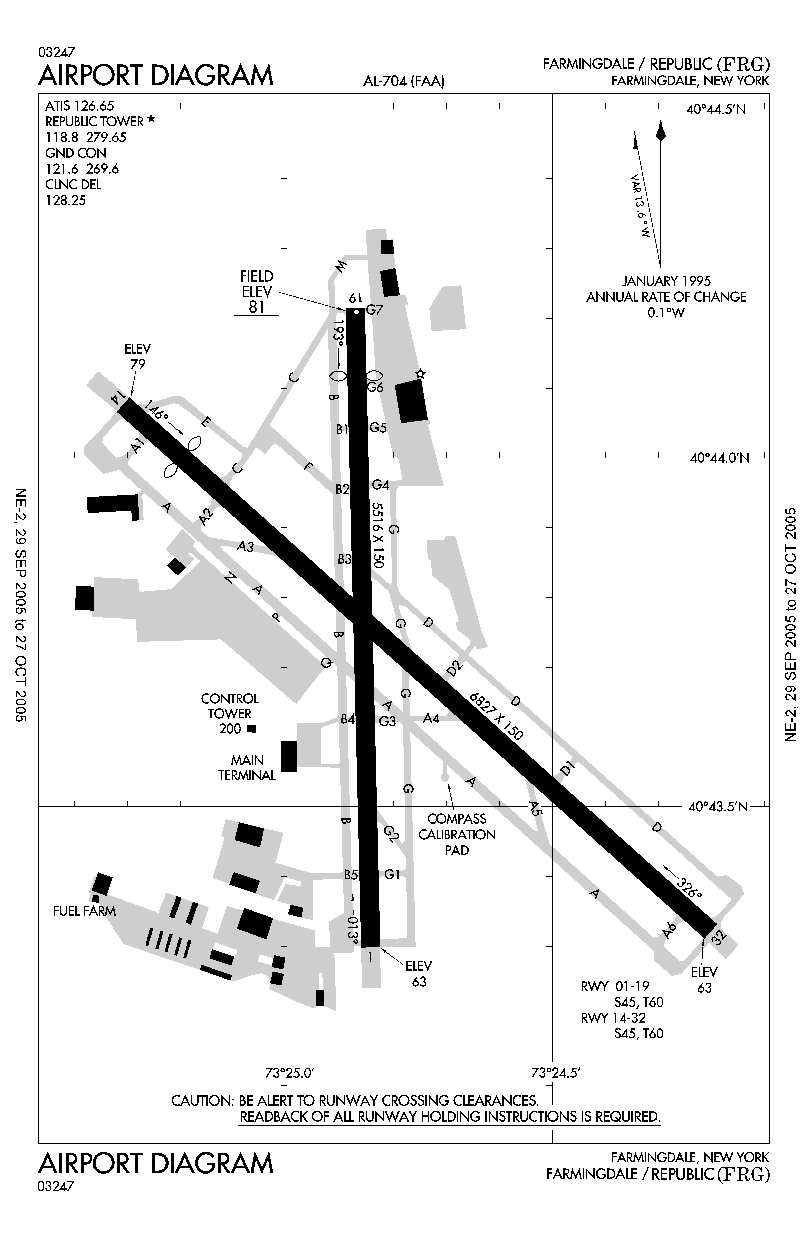
- FAA airport diagram
- Interactive map of Republic Airport

Runways
Direction	Length		Surface
Direction	ft	m	Surface
14/32	6,833	2,083	Asphalt
1/19	5,516	1,681	Asphalt

Statistics
- Aircraft operations (2019): 219,672
- Based aircraft (Aug. 2021): 350
- Source: Federal Aviation Administration

Republic Airport (IATA: FRG, ICAO: KFRG, FAA LID: FRG) is a public airport in East Farmingdale, New York, on Long Island, immediately east of the village of Farmingdale.

The National Plan of Integrated Airport Systems for 2011–2015 categorized it as a general aviation reliever airport. Federal Aviation Administration records say the airport had 3,586 passenger boardings (enplanements) in calendar year 2008, 2,866 in 2009, and 2,783 in 2010. It is the busiest public general aviation airport within the State of New York and the third largest airport overall by total annual flights – behind only John F. Kennedy International Airport and LaGuardia Airport, respectively.

On behalf of the New York State Department of Transportation, the airport is currently managed by AvPORTS – an American operator and manager of airports.

== History ==
=== Early history ===
Republic Airport was developed by Sherman Fairchild as the Fairchild Flying Field in East Farmingdale in late 1927, after determining that his existing flying field & airplane factory complex on Motor Avenue in South Farmingdale was inadequate to support the mass production of his Fairchild FC-2 and Fairchild 71 airplanes. Fairchild purchased property on the south side of Conklin Street (New York State Route 24) and had the airport's original layout plan prepared on November 3, 1927.

The 77.967-acre (315,520 m^{2}) flying field was developed in the late winter and early spring of 1928 and was originally owned and operated by Fairchild Engine & Airplane Manufacturing Company. The first flights from the Fairchild Flying Field took place in late spring of 1928 after the Fairchild Airplane and Airplane Engine factories and hangar were completed and aircraft were produced in the new factories. After Fairchild moved to Hagerstown, Maryland in 1931, Grumman Aircraft Engineering built planes at the airport from 1932 until the spring of 1937.

Seversky Aircraft moved there in January 1935 from College Point in Queens, and became Republic Aviation in 1939. Republic built more than 9,000 P-47 Thunderbolts in Farmingdale during World War II and expanded Republic Field, erected three hangars and a control tower and lengthened and hardened the runways. Republic built the straight-wing F-84 Thunderjet and the swept-wing F-84 Thunderstreak during the Korean War and extended Runway 14/32 to the southeast over the objections of Long Island State Parks Commissioner Robert Moses.

Republic Aviation produced over 800 F-105 Thunderchief fighter bombers during the Vietnam Era. Republic Aviation was acquired by the Fairchild-Hiller Corp. in 1965 for $24.5 million and Fairchild stock. Flight Safety Inc. ran Republic Airport as a general aviation airport beginning on December 7, 1966, for the Joseph Mailman's Farmingdale Corporation, which had purchased the field from Fairchild Hiller for $8 million in 1965.

=== Modern history ===
==== MTA era: 1969 – 1983 ====
Republic Airport was acquired by the Metropolitan Transportation Authority (MTA) on March 31, 1969. The MTA installed an instrument landing system (ILS) on Runway 14/32, built the terminal building at Republic Airport, and cooperated with the Federal Aviation Administration, which built the current, 100-foot (30 m) control tower.

The MTA also got the US Government to transfer 94 acres (380,000 m^{2}) to the airport in 1971 and purchased the 77-acre (310,000 m^{2}) Lambert property on the north side of New York State Route 109 and the Breslau Gardens development between New Highway and NY 109 in 1972.

The MTA also proposed building a major intermodal transportation facility at the airport. This hub would have served trains, buses, and general aviation, and would have also been the site of three office buildings built atop the Long Island Rail Road's Main Line using air rights – however, this project was ultimately never built. Similar proposals were made in the 21st century – but those, too, were never built.

==== NYSDOT era: 1983 – present ====
After complaints that the MTA was not contributing taxes to local governments and questions about the MTA spending at Republic, ownership of the airport was transferred to the New York State Department of Transportation (NYSDOT) by the New York State Legislature in April 1983, to promote economic development in the surrounding Long Island region. The Republic Airport Commission was created by the New York State Legislature in 1982 (Chap. 370, L.1982) "...as an advisory council to the Commissioner of Transportation in the administration and management of the Republic Airport facilities and its surrounding areas with respect to projects to be undertaken at such airport."

The Long Island Republic Airport Historical Society, was formed in 1984, and was chartered by the Board of Regents of the University of the State of New York in 1987.

In 1987, Fairchild went out of business. Much of its historic Fairchild-Republic factory complex was subsequently sold and redeveloped as the Airport Plaza shopping center.

In the early 1990s, NYSDOT proposed extending one of the runways at the airport at its northern end. The proposal was ultimately called-off in 1995.

In late May 2015, a major fire broke out in one of the former, vacant Fairchild-Republic aircraft factory buildings, severely damaging the structure.

In April 2023, Republic Jet Center announced that it broke ground on a new, $28 million FBO facility at the airport to replace its old one. The 50,000-square-foot (4,600 m^{2}) facility is anticipated to be completed by the end of 2024.

=== Historic airline service ===
The airport has seen scheduled passenger airlines over the years – including Cosmopolitan Airlines and Provincetown-Boston Airlines (operating as Continental Express) in the 1980s, and Northwest Airlink in the 1990s.

== Flights and facilities ==
=== Charter flights ===
Two aircraft taking off simultaneously

Charter airlines serving Republic Airport include Air Rutter International, Northeastern Aviation Corporation, Ponderosa Air, Sundance Aviation, Talon Air, and Ventura Air Services.

Most NHL teams flying charter flights onto Long Island to play the New York Islanders use Republic Airport.

=== Runways and helipads ===
The airport covers 530 acres (210 ha) of land and has two runways and two helipads:

- 14/32: 6,833 by 150 feet (2,083 m × 46 m), asphalt, grooved
- 01/19: 5,516 by 150 feet (1,681 m × 46 m), asphalt, grooved
- Helipad H1: 79 by 79 feet (24 m × 24 m), asphalt
- Helipad H2: 44 by 44 feet (13 m × 13 m), asphalt

=== Airport buildings and structures ===
Airport Control Tower

Republic Airport has a two-story terminal building serving passengers boarding charter flights to nearby cities, such as Atlantic City, New Jersey. This terminal building was constructed in the 1980s and has previously been used by regional airlines, including Northwest AIrlink.

U.S. Customs and Border Protection has an office at the terminal building; however, it is staffed by appointment only and pilots must request immigration services four hours prior to arrival.

=== General aviation ===
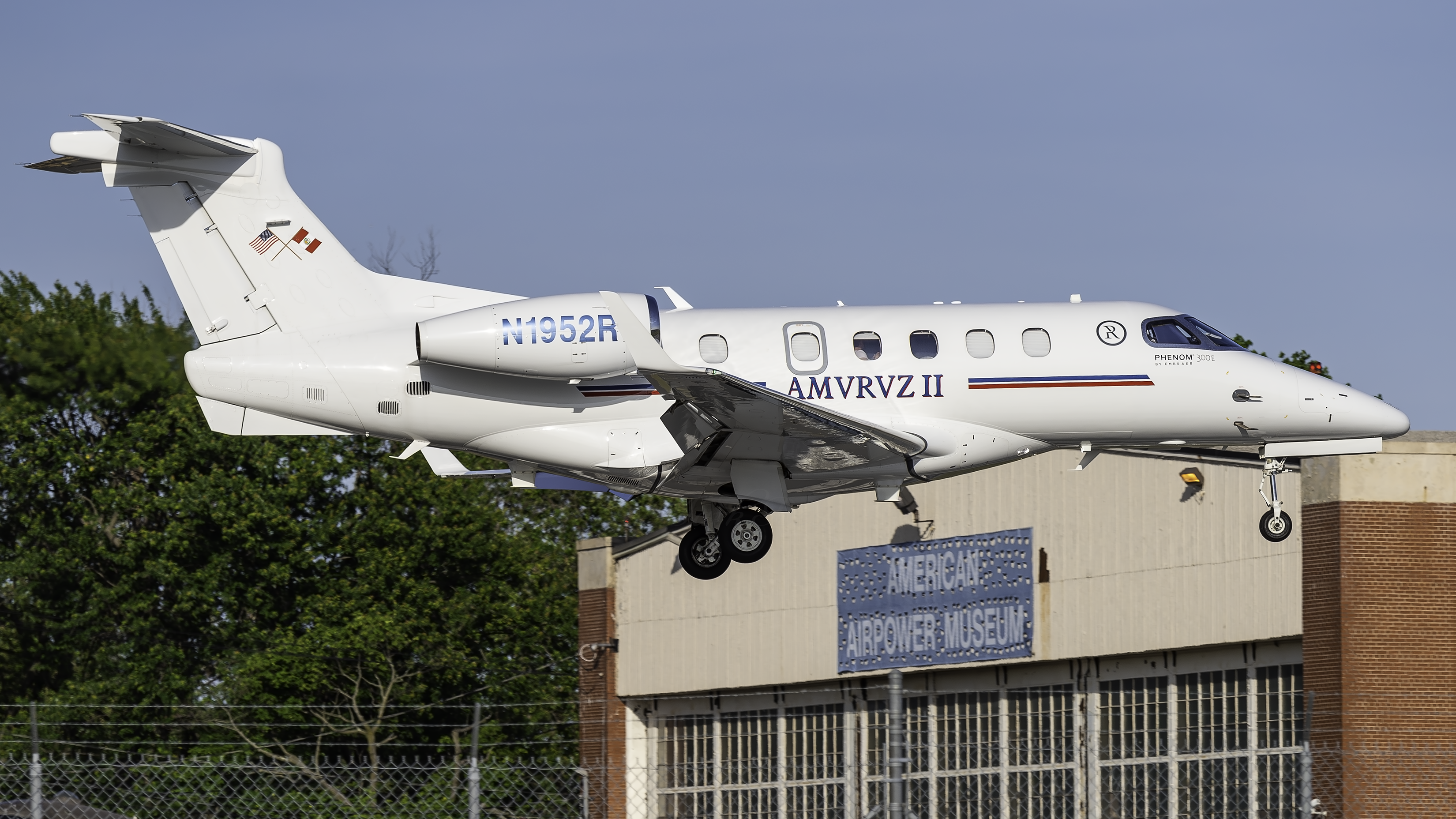
An aircraft landing at the airport in 2023.

There are two fixed-base operators that serve corporate and light general aviation customers at Republic Airport: Modern Aviation and Atlantic Aviation.

=== Museums ===
The Long Island Republic Airport Historical Society maintains historical archives and sixteen photographic exhibits illustrating the history of aviation on the first floor of the Republic Airport terminal building, behind the airport's control tower, on the east side of New York State Route 110.

Republic Airport is also home to the American Airpower Museum, which offers visitors the opportunity to see World War II aircraft in flight.

== Emergency services ==
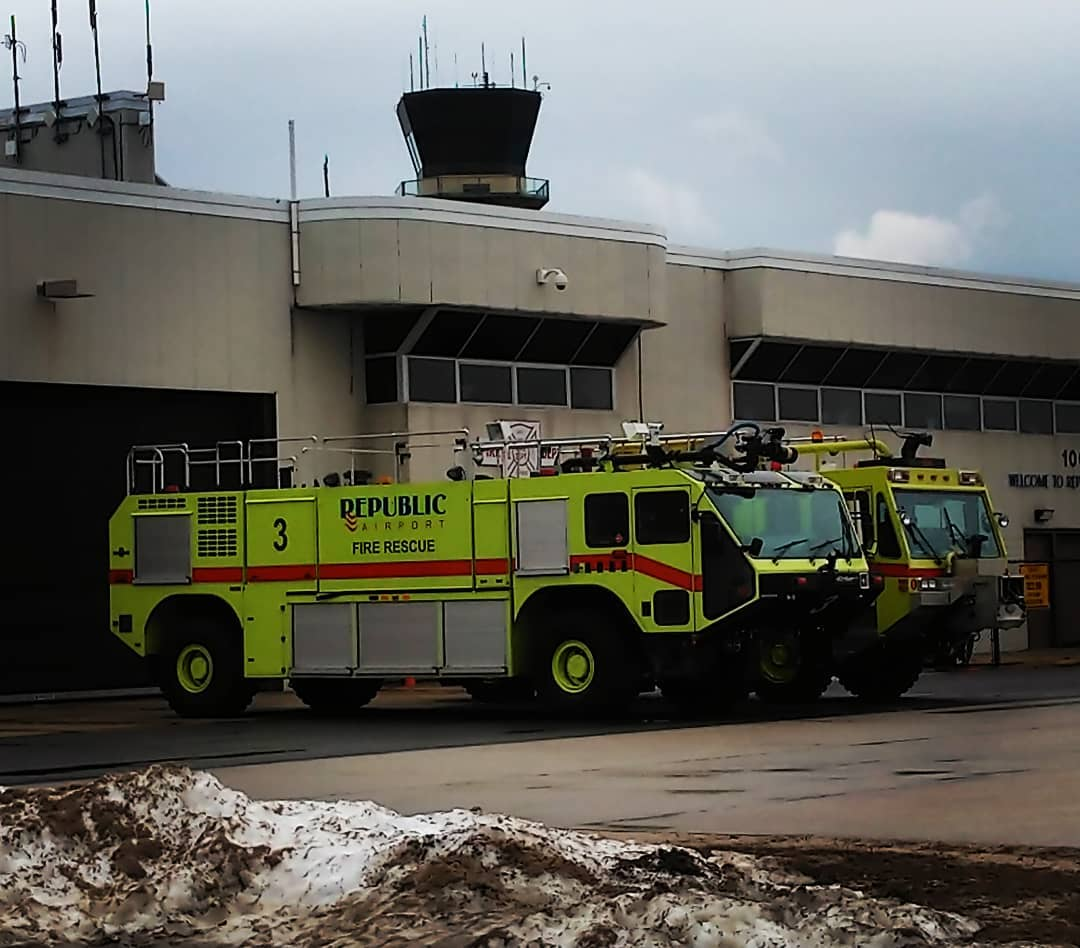
Republic Airport Fire Rescue Crash Trucks Rescue 3 and Rescue 4

=== Law enforcement ===
For law enforcement emergencies the Suffolk County Police Departments First Precinct is the primary law enforcement agency to all situations and emergencies on the airport grounds and surrounding area that require law enforcement. The Troop L of the New York State Police, which provides highway patrol for state parkways in Nassau and Suffolk Counties can also respond when needed as New York State Police Troop L is headquartered on the airport grounds. There is also a U.S Customs and Border Protection office located in the main terminal and its officers will respond to help if needed during emergency calls needing law enforcement.

=== Fire rescue ===
For fire rescue emergencies Republic Airport maintains its own full-time 24/7 Index A Aircraft rescue and firefighting fire department. The department is known officially as the Republic Airport Operations Fire Rescue Department. The department however is more commonly called Republic Airport Fire Rescue. Republic Airport Fire Rescue is the primary fire rescue department that responds to all emergencies that happen on the airport grounds. The department also will respond to any aviation emergencies and crashes in the general vicinity outside of the airport grounds. The department currently has two crash trucks (Rescue 3 and 4), and a support vehicle pickup truck (Rescue 1). The departments current Headquarters is located at the main terminal building at the airport. Republic Airport Fire Rescue also has mutual aid plans with The East Farmingdale Volunteer Fire Company and Village of Farmingdale Fire Department who when requested by Republic Airport Fire Rescue can respond to the airport to support and assist Republic Airport Fire Rescue during emergencies.

== Accidents and incidents ==
- On June 1, 1997, a Piper PA-28 crashed into a parking lot roughly 3 miles (4.8 km) north of the airport while on approach to the runway and subsequently burst into flames. The pilot and all three passengers were killed.
- On August 12, 2007, a Learjet 25 (registration N125FT) sustained severe damage after encountering a hailstorm. The airplane was withdrawn from use at Republic Airport and subsequently dismantled.
- On August 16, 2015, a Hawker Beechcraft BE35, en route from Francis S. Gabreski Airport in Westhampton Beach, New York to Morristown Municipal Airport in Whippany, New Jersey, crashed in Hicksville, New York after experiencing an engine failure. The pilot of the plane was attempting to make an emergency landing at Republic Airport after being advised of nearby airports, but was later advised by an air traffic controller that the closest field was the former Grumman Bethpage Airport in nearby Bethpage, which closed in 1990 and was subsequently redeveloped. The pilot then attempted to divert instead to the nonexistent runway at Grumman Field, and subsequently crashed at the South Oyster Bay Road railroad crossing. The crash killed the pilot, injured the passenger, and caused service disruptions on the Long Island Rail Road.
- On December 20, 2021, a Raytheon Hawker 800XP (registration N412JA), operated by Talon Air, slid off the runway and had its landing gear collapse when landing at Republic Airport from Miami–Opa Locka Executive Airport. The aircraft's two occupants (both crew members) suffered minor injuries and were transported to Nassau University Medical Center in East Meadow for treatment.
- On February 15, 2022, a Cessna 152 (registration N64949) veered off the runway into the grass during its landing at Republic Airport, subsequently damaging a runway light.
- On March 5, 2023, a Piper PA-28 with three people on board caught fire and crashed into the woods on approach to the airport. The 23-year-old pilot and one of the two passengers received critical injuries. The other passenger was killed as a result of the crash.
- On February 20, 2024, a Piper PA-28 carrying two people experienced an engine failure while on approach back to Republic Airport. The pilot subsequently performed an emergency landing on the eastbound lanes of the Southern State Parkway, just west of exit 33 and the airport, after realizing that the plane could not make it back to the runway. The two occupants were treated for minor injuries; there were no serious injuries or deaths.

== See also ==
- Transportation on Long Island
- List of airports in New York (disambiguation)
- New York World War II Army airfields
