= Grumman Bethpage Airport =

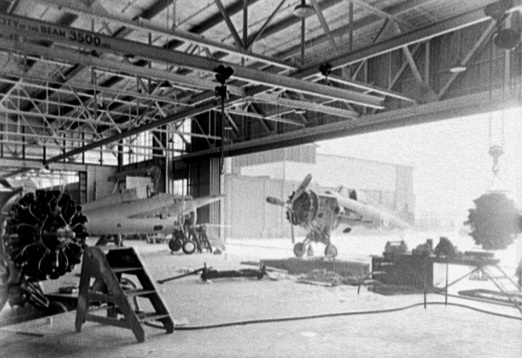
- Fighter planes being assembled at Grumman Bethpage Airport in 1940.
- IATA: ~~BPA~~; ICAO: ~~KBPA~~

Summary
- Airport type: Private
- Owner/Operator: Grumman Aerospace
- Location: Bethpage, New York, U.S.
- Opened: 1936
- Closed: 1990
- Time zone: EST (UTC−05:00)
  - Summer (DST): EDT (UTC−04:00)
- Elevation AMSL: 115 ft / 35 m
- Coordinates: 40.749401°N 73.496002°W

Map
- Interactive map of Grumman Bethpage Airport

Grumman Bethpage Airport (IATA: ~~BPA~~, ICAO: ~~KBPA~~) – also known as Grumman Airport, Bethpage Airport, and Grumman Field – was an airport located in Bethpage within the Town of Oyster Bay, in Nassau County, on Long Island, New York, United States.

The airport was also the former headquarters of Grumman Aerospace and was home to Naval Weapons Industrial Reserve Plant, Bethpage.

== History ==
Grumman opened the 120-acre (49 ha) Grumman Bethpage Airport in 1936, after outgrowing its facilities at the nearby Republic Airport in East Farmingdale; the company also erected its corporate headquarters and aircraft manufacturing factories on the site.

During World War II, the uptick in military aircraft manufacturing, testing, other operations saw a major uptick, leading to Grumman upgrading the facilities. The upgrades included improving the airport's runways; the engineering services for the runway improvements were carried out by an engineer from South Farmingdale, Henry Holzmacher.

Over the course of its existence, Grumman used the airport and its facilities to manufacture and test a significant number of its airplanes and spacecraft, including many of its fighter jets as well as the Apollo Lunar Modules used for the Apollo moon landings.

In 1975, Grumman proposed opening up BPA to general aviation traffic. The proposal would have generated additional revenue for Grumman, and it would have enabled competition with Republic Airport in general aviation traffic. Being surrounded by then by dense housing developments on all sides, the proposal was met with stiff opposition from both local residents and the Town of Oyster Bay. The plan was ultimately called off.

By the late 1980s, near the end of the Cold War, operations at the airport had decreased. A major blow to the airport came in 1989, when the George H.W. Bush Administration cancelled the federal contract for the manufacturing of F-14D fighter jets, which some economists claim quickened the demise of the airport.

=== Closure and subsequent history ===
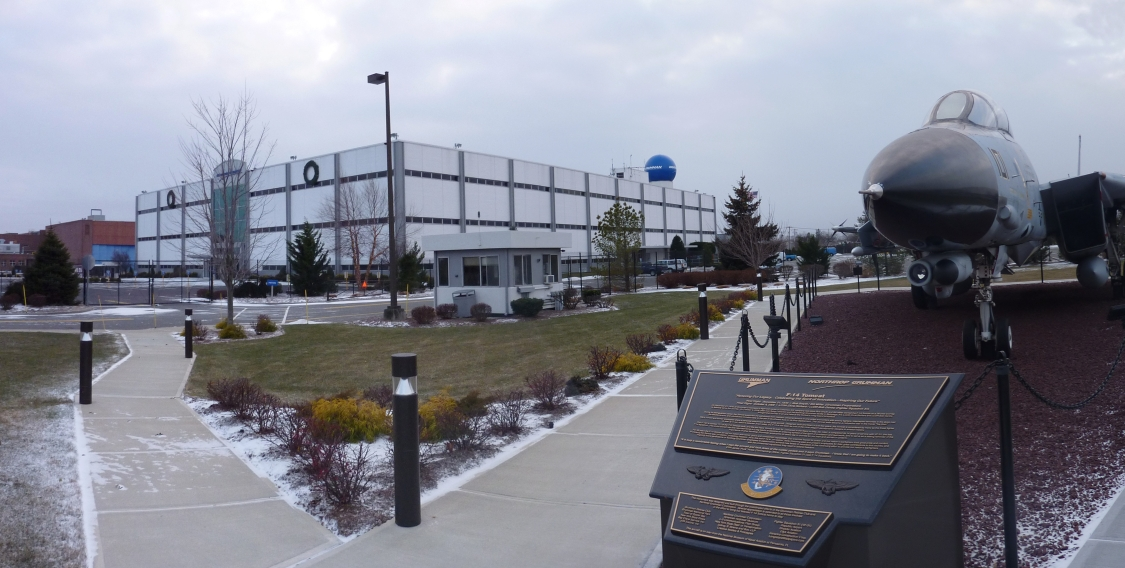
Part of the redeveloped Grumman facility in 2010, showing a plaza with a Grumman F-14 Tomcat jet on display.

In 1990, the airport was closed. Following its closure, it was redeveloped, with large portions becoming the Bethpage Business Park. The facility at the site formerly used to manufacture the Apollo Lunar Modules was subsequently repurposed and now serves as a facility for Grumman Studios. The building which formerly housed the headquarters of Grumman subsequently became Cablevision's headquarters.

Manufacturing operations continued at the site until 1996 – two years after Grumman and Northrop merged to form Northrop Grumman. As of 2024, Northrop Grumman continues to have some offices on the site of the former airport.

A portion of the airport property was also redeveloped into Grumman Field.

==== Toxic plume cleanup ====
The former Grumman property is the source of a large toxic plume which has impacted the groundwater around the facility. The contamination and subsequent discoveries have led to scandals involving state & federal government agencies, the United States Navy, and Grumman – and caused the site to be designated as a Superfund site. Cleanup of the contamination is ongoing as of 2024, and many barrels of toxic waste have been uncovered throughout the area over the years.

== Accidents and incidents ==
On August 16, 2015, a Hawker Beechcraft BE35, en route from Francis S. Gabreski Airport in Westhampton Beach, New York to Morristown Municipal Airport in Whippany, New Jersey, crashed in Hicksville, New York after experiencing an engine failure and being guided to Grumman Bethpage Airport (which by had been redeveloped prior to the accident). The pilot of the plane was attempting to make an emergency landing at Republic Airport after being advised of nearby airports, but was later advised by an air traffic controller that the closest field was Grumman Bethpage. The pilot then attempted to divert instead to the nonexistent runway at Grumman Field, and subsequently crashed at the South Oyster Bay Road railroad crossing. The crash killed the pilot, injured the passenger, and caused service disruptions on the Long Island Rail Road.

== Nassau County Police Heliport ==
The Nassau County Police Heliport (FAA ID: 8NY9) is a publicly owned police heliport, located in Bethpage, New York.

The heliport was activated in November 1941 and is used by the Nassau County Police Department as a base for some of its police helicopter operations. It is located on the north side of the former Grumman Bethpage Airport. The facility has one helipad – Helipad H1; the helipad has an asphalt surface and is 50 by 50 feet (15 m × 15 m) in size.

== See also ==
- Calverton Executive Airpark – Another, former Long Island airport used by Grumman.
