= Naval Weapons Industrial Reserve Plant, Bethpage =

- Part of United States Navy
- Bethpage, New York

Site information
- Type: Aircraft Plant
- Controlled by: Navy
- Open to the public: No

Location
- Coordinates: 40°44′44.88″N 73°29′30.12″W

Naval Weapons Industrial Reserve Plant, Bethpage (NWIRP) – also known as Northrop Grumman Site Facility – was a United States government-owned, contractor-operated (GOCO) facility established in 1941, with the mission to design, fabricate, and test prototype aircraft for the United States Navy and NASA in the hamlet of Bethpage within the Town of Oyster Bay, in Nassau County, New York, United States.

Two groundwater plumes of toxic chemicals, mostly volatile organic compounds migrating from the property were discovered in 1986 and in 2009, affecting the water district well fields. The site is subject to state Superfund cleanup plans. Special water treatment plants were established in the early 2000s.

== History ==
The former Naval Weapons Industrial Reserve Plant is situated on 605 acres in the Town of Oyster Bay, Bethpage, NY. In 1936, the Grumman Corporation was founded and produced aircraft at the site, before the Navy established the Naval Weapons Industrial Reserve Plant, Bethpage there in 1941.

The site was a 'storage facility' and since 1976 permitted under the federal Resource Conservation and Recovery Act (RCRA) to both the Navy and Northrop Grumman as responsible parties. In 1986, the first of 2 known plumes of contamination was discovered, a shallow one; in 2009 a larger, deeper plume was found under what became the Bethpage Community Park. Grumman installed and operates an Onsite Containment System. Manufacturing stopped in 1996. There are public and private water wells located within a two-mile radius of the plant, as of 2014 and local water districts worry that public-supply wells could be affected. 2014 results from a monitoring well the Navy installed north of Hempstead Turnpike show Trichloroethylene levels as high as 4,600 parts per billion in groundwater hundreds of feet below the surface.=

== Groundwater Flow Simulation ==
In 2010 the groundwater flow system was simulated by Paul Misut of the USGS to provide a scientific basis for designing systems to remediate the groundwater plumes that originated from the facility. A new study published in 2020 provides updated information.

== See also ==
- Grumman Bethpage Airport – The former, associated airport in the same location.
- Naval Weapons Industrial Reserve Plant, Calverton
- Naval Weapons Industrial Reserve Plant, Dallas
- Naval Weapons Industrial Reserve Plant, Bedford
