= Cosmopolitan Airlines =

American airline

- Commenced operations: 1978; 48 years ago
- Ceased operations: 1980; 46 years ago
- Operating bases: Republic Airport
- Destinations: See Destinations served below
- Headquarters: Farmingdale, New York, United States

Cosmopolitan Airlines was a FAR Part 121 Supplemental Air Carrier airline based at Republic Airport in Farmingdale, Long Island, New York, which served both commuter and charter flights. The airline operated from 1978 to 1983, with flights ending in 1983. It flew three Convair 440 planes, which were available for public charters, and Cessna 404s, 421s, and 310s for the scheduled commuter flights to Boston (FAR Part 135 operations). Two of the Convairs were configured as 52-seat passenger carriers, and the third configured for up to 42 passengers.

During the summer months the airline, chartered by Trans East International Airlines (also based at Farmingdale Republic Airport), flew scheduled flights from La Guardia to Nantucket and Martha's Vineyard. Did Charter flights for Corporate executives: e.g.: Frank Perdue's Execs to Salisbury, MD.

== Destinations served ==
- Massachusetts
  - Boston (Logan International Airport)
- New Jersey
  - Atlantic City (Atlantic City International Airport)
- New York
  - Albany (Albany International Airport)
  - Farmingdale (Republic Airport)*

An asterisk (*) indicates that this airport is no longer served by passenger service.

== Proposed expansion ==
Before the halting of operations in 1980, the airline sought to initiate its public charter service from Farmingdale's Republic Airport to the following destinations:

- Maryland
  - Baltimore/Washington (Baltimore Washington International Airport)
- New York
  - Buffalo (Buffalo Niagara International Airport)
- Pennsylvania
  - Philadelphia (Philadelphia International Airport
  - Pittsburgh (Pittsburgh International Airport)

Those cities were already being served by CA's Atlantic City charters.

== See also ==
- List of defunct airlines of the United States
