= Heitz Place Courthouse =

- U.S. National Register of Historic Places
- New York State Register of Historic Places
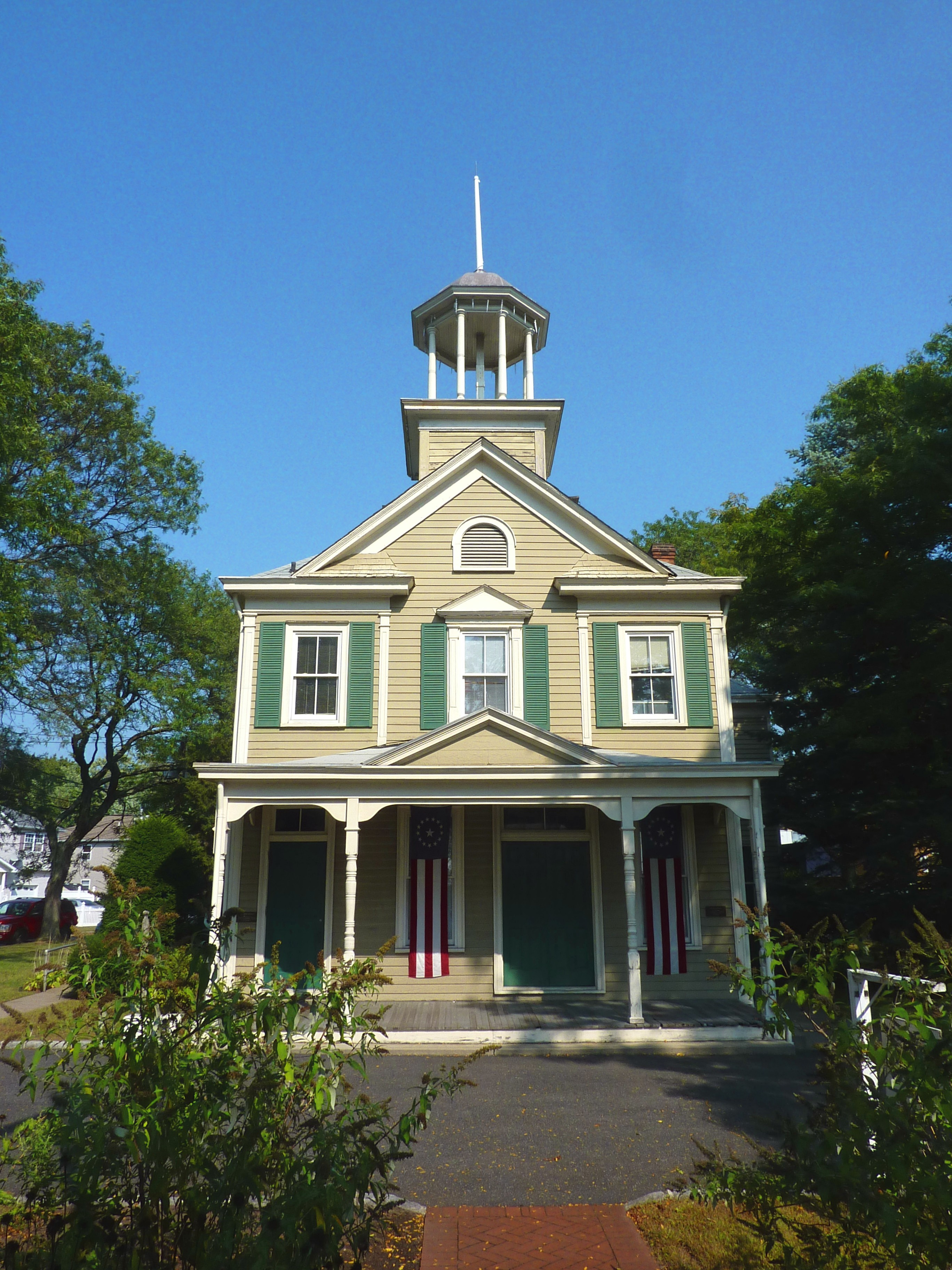
- Heitz Place Courthouse as seen from within the west side of the Heitz Place-Bay Avenue traffic circle

- Location within New York Location within the United States
- Location: Heitz Pl., Hicksville, New York
- Coordinates: 40°46′8″N 73°31′16″W
- Area: less than one acre
- Built: 1895
- NRHP reference No.: 74001263

Significant dates
- Added to NRHP: July 30, 1974
- Designated NYSRHP: June 23, 1980

Heitz Place Courthouse is a historic courthouse building located in Hicksville in Nassau County, New York, United States.

== Description ==
It was built in 1895 and is a two-story, hipped roof balloon frame building sheathed with clapboards. It features full height pilasters, a full-length verandah, and an open octagonal cupola.

It was listed on the National Register of Historic Places in 1974. Six years later, in 1980, it was listed on the New York State Register of Historic Places.

The building is currently used to hold the collections of the Hicksville Gregory Museum.
