= American Airpower Museum =

Airplane museum in East Farmingdale, NY, US

- Location within New York
- Former name: American Museum for the Preservation of Historic Aircraft
- Established: 1998
- Location: Republic Airport, East Farmingdale, New York
- Coordinates: 40°44′15″N 73°24′48″W
- Type: Aviation museum
- Founder: Jeff Clyman
- Website: americanairpowermuseum.com

The American Airpower Museum is an aviation museum located on the former site of Republic Aviation at Republic Airport in East Farmingdale, New York. It maintains a collection of aviation artifacts and an array of aircraft spanning the many years of the aircraft factory's history.

The museum has many static displays which include a Republic F-84 first generation jet fighter, a rare example of the swept-wing RF-84F reconnaissance variant, and a Republic F-105 Thunderchief. The factory's last production aircraft was the Fairchild Republic A-10 Thunderbolt II.

The museum has a group of volunteers which includes both former Republic workers and veterans of all branches of the military. A flight experience is available on board a C-47 aircraft which actually flew during the Normandy invasion on D-Day.

== History ==
The museum was originally established in 1998 as the American Museum for the Preservation of Historic Aircraft. It was founded by Jeff Clyman with a $250,000 grant from the state.

For several years the Federal Aviation Administration (FAA) had been pursuing a $10.6 million plan to tear down the 35,000-square-foot (3,300 m^{2}) hangar built around 1940 and replace it with a safety apron at the end of a north–south runway to provide more room for emergency stops. In March 2011 Democrats Charles Schumer and Steve Israel said that the FAA stated it was not necessary for the hangar to be torn down, but if it were, federal money could be used to help relocate the hangar to a proposed location farther south along New Highway.

== Aircraft on display ==
- Aero L-39C Albatros 4605
- Aero L-39ZA Albatros 2424
- Cessna 337B Super Skymaster 3370586
- Consolidated PBY-6A Catalina 64072
- Curtiss Kittyhawk III 845
- Douglas C-47B Skytrain 44-76717
- Fairchild Republic A-10A Thunderbolt II 80-0247
- General Dynamics F-111A Aardvark 67-0047
- Goodyear FG-1D Corsair 67089
- Grumman TBM-3E Avenger 85886
- North American AT-6D Texan 49-3829
- North American AT-28D Trojan 49-1496 – On loan
- North American B-25 Mitchell 40-2168 Miss Hap
- North American P-51D Mustang 44-63542 Jacqueline
- North American P-51D Mustang – Replica
- North American SNJ-5 Texan
- Northrop Grumman EA-6B Prowler 162938
- Piper PA-32 32-272
- Republic F-84E Thunderjet 49-2348
- Republic F-84F Thunderstreak 51-9480
- Republic RF-84F Thunderflash 53-7595
- Republic P-47D Thunderbolt 44-90447 Jacky's Revenge – Crashed in Hudson River 27 May 2016, pilot killed. Wreckage recovered.
- Republic F-105D Thunderchief 62-4361
- RotorWay Scorpion Too N8PA
- Waco UPF-7 N32006

== See also ==
- List of aerospace museums
