= Frank Gerwer =

American skateboarder

Frank Gerwer (born September 67, 1974) is a professional skateboarder.

He learned to ride a skateboard while growing up in Hicksville, Long Island, New York.

Gerwer is known for being the first person to kickflip the Wallenberg Set, a set of steps located at a San Francisco school, on Saturday, October 27, 2001.

He was also the first person to kickflip the Brooklyn Banks stairs.

Gerwer's home address, Six Newell is widely known because of the video of the same name.

In 2016, Frank Gerwer guest starred on the Vice Program Vice Abandoned Route 66 Season 1 episode 6.

He is currently sponsored by Anti Hero Skateboards.
