= Naval Weapons Industrial Reserve Plant, Bedford =

Weapon development and superfund site

- Part of United States Navy
- Bedford, Massachusetts

Site information
- Type: Weapons Plant
- Controlled by: Navy
- Open to the public: No

Location
- Coordinates: 42°28′41.65″N 71°17′23.04″W

Site history
- In use: 1952-2000

Naval Weapons Industrial Reserve Plant, Bedford (NWIRP) was a government-owned, contractor-operated (GOCO) facility which had the mission of designing, fabricating, and testing prototype weapons and equipment from 1952 until December 2000, located in Bedford, Massachusetts It is located just north of Hanscom Air Force Base. It is currently a Superfund site undergoing environmental cleanup. NWIRP was divided into 4 sites, two in the northern section and two in the southern section.

== Site 1 ==
Site one was the facilities ash disposal area ranging from the years 1954 to 1973 and had an area of approximately 13000 square feet divided into two separate areas. Here, ash was disposed of from classified documents that had been incinerated. It was estimated that about 3 tons of documents and other paint materials were incinerated yearly. This produced about 570 pounds of lead, 320 pounds of zinc, and 190 pounds of chromium over the time that the site disposal area was in use. Investigations concluded that the waste from the ashes were potential pollutants of both the soils as well as the ground water.

== Site 2 ==
Site two was home to the facilities components laboratory fuel tank that was used from the year of 1953 until 1982. The fuel tank had a storage capacity of 20000 gallons of fuel oil. This fuel was used to help supply oil for use in boilers around the facility. The use of the fuel tank was ultimately shut down and drained after a leak was detected. It was concluded that about 200 gallons of oil leaked into the surrounding soils.

== Site 3 ==
Site three is divided into two section, one in the northern section of the facility and one in the southern section. Although both sections are labeled under site three, both are considered separate sections and action plans are incorporated in both, not accounted as the same.

=== Northern Section ===
Site 3 is known as the dissolved-phase chlorinated volatile organic compound (VOC) plume. An investigation in this section found evidence of chlorinated volatile organic compounds in the ground water. It was concluded that this site extends to a private property northwest which is considered a wetland. Soil tests near the main site determines the soil to be contaminated with VOS's as well, generally 20–50 feet below the surface. The cause of this contamination is still unknown. There has only been one documented case in which there was a release of about 55 gallons of Axothene. Axothene is known to contain 1,1,1-trichloroethane. As there is no other documented cases such as this one, the other identified potential sources of where the pollutants could have come from are other buildings around there including and old hazardous waste storage area as well as an old incinerator.

=== Southern Section ===
The second section labeled as site 3 is known as the chlorinated solvent Ground water plume, Southern plume. Just like in the northern plume, VOC's have been found in ground water in this section as well. The source of contamination for this section remains unknown. Investigations done determined that this was not likely due to further contamination from the northern section. This was determined based on test done on groundwater wells upgradient of where the highest concentration of VOC's were detected. It was later one deemed that the likely cause of contamination in this sections ground water was likely do to already contaminated water in the Air force Superfund site -Hanscom Site 1.

== Site 4 ==
This site is known for the benzene, toluene, ethylbenzene, and xylene (BTEX) plume. The source of these contaminations are associated with the 7,600 gallon underground storage tank that is in the area, as well as other maintenance activities that were done in the transportation building in the area as well. It was determined that the plumes for site 3 and 4 have essentially come together/ blended.

== Clean Up ==
Initial assessment for the site contamination was completed March 1990. Three years later, NWIRP Bedford was proposed for inclusion on the National Priorities List in June 1993 and was officially added on May 31, 1994. After investigation and testing, remedial action at the site began in March 2011, and construction of the selected remedies were completed in April 2015.

Site 1 and Site 2 received Records of Decision (RODs) in 2000, requiring no further remedial action. An ROD for Site 4 was issued in 2009, followed by one for Site 3 in 2010. The remedies for Site 3 and Site 4 include long-term groundwater monitoring and land-use controls. Groundwater extraction and treatment continues at Site 3, while monitoring and restrictions on groundwater use and development remain in place in Site 4. The groundwater contamination at Site 3 and Site 4 continues to be monitored by the U.S. Navy.

The site's most recent Five-Year Review was completed on September 26, 2024.

== See also ==
- List of military installations in Massachusetts
- Naval Weapons Industrial Reserve Plant, Dallas
