= County Route 9 (Nassau County, New York) =

Road on Long Island, New York

Nassau County Route 9

Route information
- Maintained by NCDPW
- Length: 6.09 mi (9.80 km)

Major junctions
- South end: NY 107 in Bethpage
- Old Country Road (CR 25) in Plainview; Woodbury Road (CR 12) in Plainview; Northern State Parkway in Syosset; I-495 in Syosset; NY 25 in Syosset
- North end: NY 25A in Oyster Bay Cove

Location
- Country: United States
- State: New York
- County: Nassau

Highway system
- County routes in New York; County Routes in Nassau County

Nassau County Route 9 is a major, 6.09-mile (9.80 km) county highway in Nassau County, on Long Island, New York, connecting Bethpage and the Village of Oyster Bay Cove.

Consisting of two disconnected segments – one linking Bethpage & Syosset, and the other linking Syosset & Oyster Bay Cove, County Route 9 was originally a continuous north-south route between Broadway (NY 107) in Bethpage and West Main Street (CR E52) in Oyster Bay.

CR 9 is owned and maintained by the Nassau County Department of Public Works, and consists of Berry Hill Road, Jackson Avenue, and South Oyster Bay Road.

== Route description ==
County Route 9 is split into two segments. The southern, 4.38-mile (7.05 km) segment consists of South Oyster Bay Road and extends from Broadway (NY 107) in Bethpage to Jericho Turnpike (NY 25) in Syosset. The northern, 1.1-mile (1.8 km) segment consists of portions of Jackson Avenue and Berry Hill Road, and extends from Underhill Boulevard (CR E42) in Syosset to the North Hempstead Turnpike (NY 25A) in Oyster Bay Cove; the two segments are separated by a Town of Oyster Bay-owned segment of Jackson Avenue – a segment which itself was once part of CR 9.

=== Southern segment (South Oyster Bay Road) ===
The southern segment of CR 9 begins at Broadway (NY 107) in Bethpage, adjacent to the former Grumman Bethpage Airport. From there, it runs north along the edge of the former airport property, soon reaching an intersection with Hazel Street and Grumman Road West on the Bethpage–Hicksville Line. It then curves towards the northeast, crosses the Main Line of the Long Island Rail Road at grade, and then curves back to the north and reaching Aerospace Boulevard & Old South Oyster Bay Road shortly thereafter. From there, it continues straight, northwards along the Hicksville–Bethpage line, and soon intersects Stewart Avenue (CR E33). North of this intersection, South Oyster Bay Road soon intersects Old Country Road (CR 25) & Plainview Road (CR D16), now along the Hicksville–Plainview border.

North of Old Country Road, South Oyster Bay Road continues straight, northwards along the Hicksville–Plainview border, and eventually reaches Woodbury Road (CR 12). It then continues north, and it soon reaches the Hicksville–Plainview–Syosset border at an intersection with Market Lane. From there, CR 9 curves slightly towards the north-northeast, continuing along the Hicksville–Syosset line, soon reaching a cloverleaf interchange with the Northern State Parkway; this interchange is Exit 36 N–S. CR 9 crosses the parkway and fully enters Syosset at the interchange. It then continues north-northeast and reaches the Terrehans Lane & the South Service Road of the Long Island Expressway (I-495) shortly thereafter, and then crosses over that highway before immediately intersecting with the North Service Road; South Oyster Bay Road serves as Exit 43 on I-495. South Oyster Bay Road then continues it way northwards through Syosset, until reaching an intersection with Jericho Turnpike (NY 25) and Jackson Avenue; this marks the north end of the southern segment of CR 9 – and of South Oyster Bay Road. The roadway continues north as a Town of Oyster Bay-maintained segment of Jackson Avenue.

=== Northern segment ===
The northern segment of CR 9 begins as Jackson Avenue, at the intersection of Underhill Boulevard (CR E42) and the town-maintained segment of Jackson Avenue. From there, it runs northeast, reaching the southern terminus of CR E39 (Jackson Avenue / Cold Spring Road) one block later. CR 9 then veers north onto Berry Hill Road and immediately thereafter intersects Muttontown–Eastwoods Road (CR C69). It then winds its way through northern Syosset and eventually enters the Village of Oyster Bay Cove. Within that village, the road then continues north before curving towards the northwest and then reaching an intersection with the North Hempstead Turnpike (NY 25A); this location marks the northern end of the northern segment of CR 9, and Berry Hill Road continues north from this intersection as CR C16.

== History ==
Former shield for CR 9.

Like all other county routes in Nassau County, County Route 9 became unsigned in the 1970s, when Nassau County officials opted to remove the signs as opposed to allocating the funds for replacing them with new ones that met the latest federal design standards and requirements, as per the federal government's Manual on Uniform Traffic Control Devices.

When originally designated, County Route 9 formed a continuous north-south route between NY 107 in Bethpage and West Main Street (CR E52) in the hamlet of Oyster Bay, via South Oyster Bay Road, Jackson Avenue, Berry Hill Road, and Lexington Avenue. Furthermore, all of Jackson Avenue was originally part of CR 9 and owned by Nassau County. The segment of Jackson Avenue between Jericho Turnpike (NY 25) and Underhill Boulevard (CR E42) in Syosset was eventually decommissioned as a county highway, upon that segment's ownership being transferred from Nassau County to the Town of Oyster Bay; this former segment of CR 9 is now a town-maintained highway.

CR 9 served as a major access road for the Grumman Bethpage Airport & Grumman's facilities at the site throughout the 20th century. When the airport & facilities were expanded in the mid-20th century, the segment of South Oyster Bay Road between present-day Aerospace Boulevard and NY 107 was bypassed with a new alignment skirting the northwest side of the expanded airfield, to make room for a runway extension. Upon completion of the relocated roadway in 1951, the original alignment between the north side of the LIRR tracks southwards to the south side of the former airfield (including the original grade crossing) was eliminated; the runway expansion was completed shortly thereafter. The remaining segments of the original alignment are now known as Old South Oyster Bay Road. Following the airport's closure in the 1990s, the airport was redeveloped while Northrop Grumman retained a portion of the property for corporate offices. It continues to serve as a major access highway for freight traffic heading to and from the redeveloped site, which contains a large industrial park.

== Major intersections ==
The entire road is located within the Town of Oyster Bay, in Nassau County.

Location	mi	km	Destinations	Notes
Bethpage	0.00	0.00	NY 107 (Broadway) – Glen Cove, Massapequa	Southern terminus of CR 9; at-grade intersection
Bethpage–Hicksville line	1.25	2.01	Stewart Avenue (CR E33)	
Hicksville–Plainview line	1.55	2.49	Old Country Road (CR 25); Plainview Road (CR D16)	
Hicksville–Plainview line	2.48	3.99	Woodbury Road (CR 12)	
Hicksville–Syosset line	3.19	5.13	Northern State Parkway – New York, Hauppauge	Exit 36 N–S on the Northern State Parkway; cloverleaf interchange
Syosset	3.46	5.57	South Service Road / Terrehans Lane	Eastbound traffic only; access to I-495 (Long Island Expressway) at exit 43, via South Service Road (Terrehans Lane)
Syosset	3.55	5.71	North Service Road	Westbound traffic only; access to I-495 (Long Island Expressway) at exit 43, via North Service Road
Syosset	4.38	7.05	NY 25 (Jericho Turnpike) – New York, Orient Point	Northern terminus of South Oyster Bay Road and the southern segment of CR 9; at-grade intersection Roadway continues north as town-maintained segment of Jackson Avenue
Syosset	Gap in route; connection made via town-owned segment of Jackson Avenue			
Syosset	0.00	0.00	Underhill Boulevard (CR E42)	Southern terminus of the northern segment of CR 9; access to the Syosset LIRR station Roadway continues south as town-maintained segment of Jackson Avenue southern terminus of county-maintained segment of Jackson Avenue
Syosset	0.14	0.23	Muttontown Eastwoods Road (CR C69); Split Rock Road	
Oyster Bay Cove	0.25	0.40	NY 25A (North Hempstead Turnpike) – New York, Calverton	At-grade intersection; northern terminus of CR 9 designation Berry Hill Road continues north as CR C16
1.000 mi = 1.609 km; 1.000 km = 0.621 mi

== See also ==
- List of county routes in Nassau County, New York
