= Hicksville, New York =

- Hamlet and census-designated place
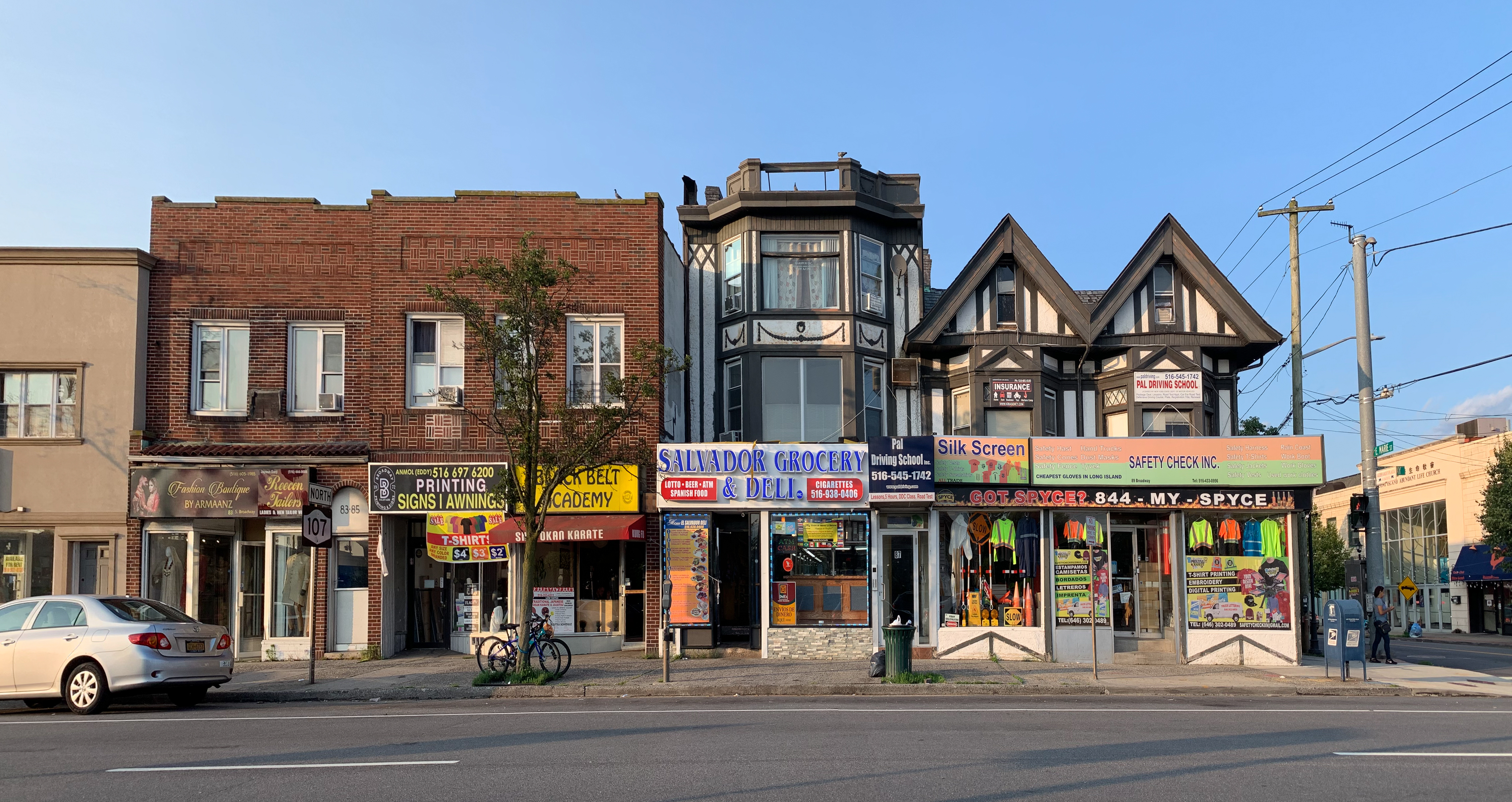
- Broadway in Hicksville, one of the hamlet's main thoroughfares, June 2019
- Motto: "The community with time for you"
- Location in Nassau County and the state of New York

- Location on Long Island Location within the state of New York
- Coordinates: 40°45′48″N 73°31′24″W
- Country: United States
- State: New York
- County: Nassau
- Town: Oyster Bay
- Named for: Valentine Hicks

Area
  - Total: 6.81 sq mi (17.63 km^{2})
  - Land: 6.79 sq mi (17.59 km^{2})
  - Water: 0.015 sq mi (0.04 km^{2})
- Elevation: 148 ft (45 m)

Population (2020)
  - Total: 43,869
  - Density: 6,458.8/sq mi (2,493.74/km^{2})
- Time zone: UTC-5 (Eastern (EST))
  - Summer (DST): UTC-4 (EDT)
- ZIP Codes: 11801 (Hicksville); 11590 (Westbury); 11791 (Syosset)
- Area codes: 516, 363
- FIPS code: 36-34374
- GNIS feature ID: 0952707

Hicksville is a hamlet and census-designated place (CDP) within the Town of Oyster Bay in Nassau County, on Long Island, in New York, United States. The CDP's population was 43,869 at the time of the 2020 census.

== History ==
Valentine Hicks – the hamlet's namesake – was the son-in-law of abolitionist and Quaker preacher Elias Hicks, and an eventual president of the Long Island Rail Road. He bought land in what is now Hicksville in 1834, and turned it into a station stop on the LIRR in 1837. Hicksville was founded accidentally when a financial depression brought the LIRR to a stop at Broadway, Hicksville. The station slowly grew and though it started as a train station, it turned into a hotel then a real estate deal, even becoming a depot for produce, particularly cucumbers for a Heinz Company plant. After a blight destroyed the cucumber crops, the farmers grew potatoes. It turned into a bustling New York City suburb in the building boom following World War II.

=== Failed incorporation attempt ===
In 1953, Hicksville attempted to incorporate itself as the Incorporated Village of Hicksville. Many residents felt that by incorporating as a village, the community would be run more effectively than how it had been run under the control of the Town of Oyster Bay. A petition had been signed with 6,242 signatures from residents in favor of the plan. However, these plans were unsuccessful, and Hicksville remains an unincorporated area of the Town of Oyster Bay to this day, as of 2026.

== Geography ==
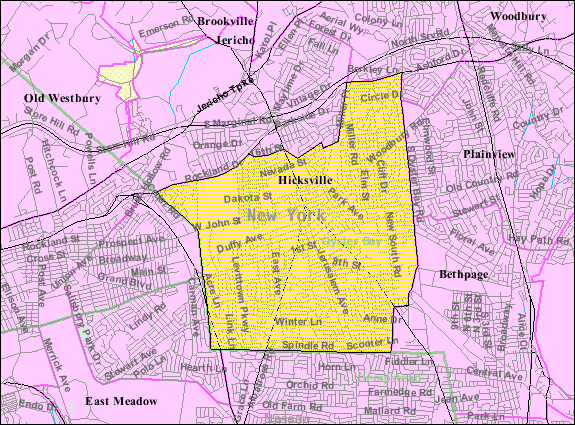
U.S. Census map of Hicksville

According to the United States Census Bureau, the CDP has a total area of 6.8 square miles (18 km^{2}), of which 6.8 square miles (18 km^{2}) is land and 0.15% is water.

=== Climate ===
The climate is borderline between hot-summer humid continental (Dfa) and humid subtropical (Cfa) and the local hardiness zone is 7a. Average monthly temperatures in the village center range from 31.9 °F in January to 74.7 °F in July.

== Economy ==
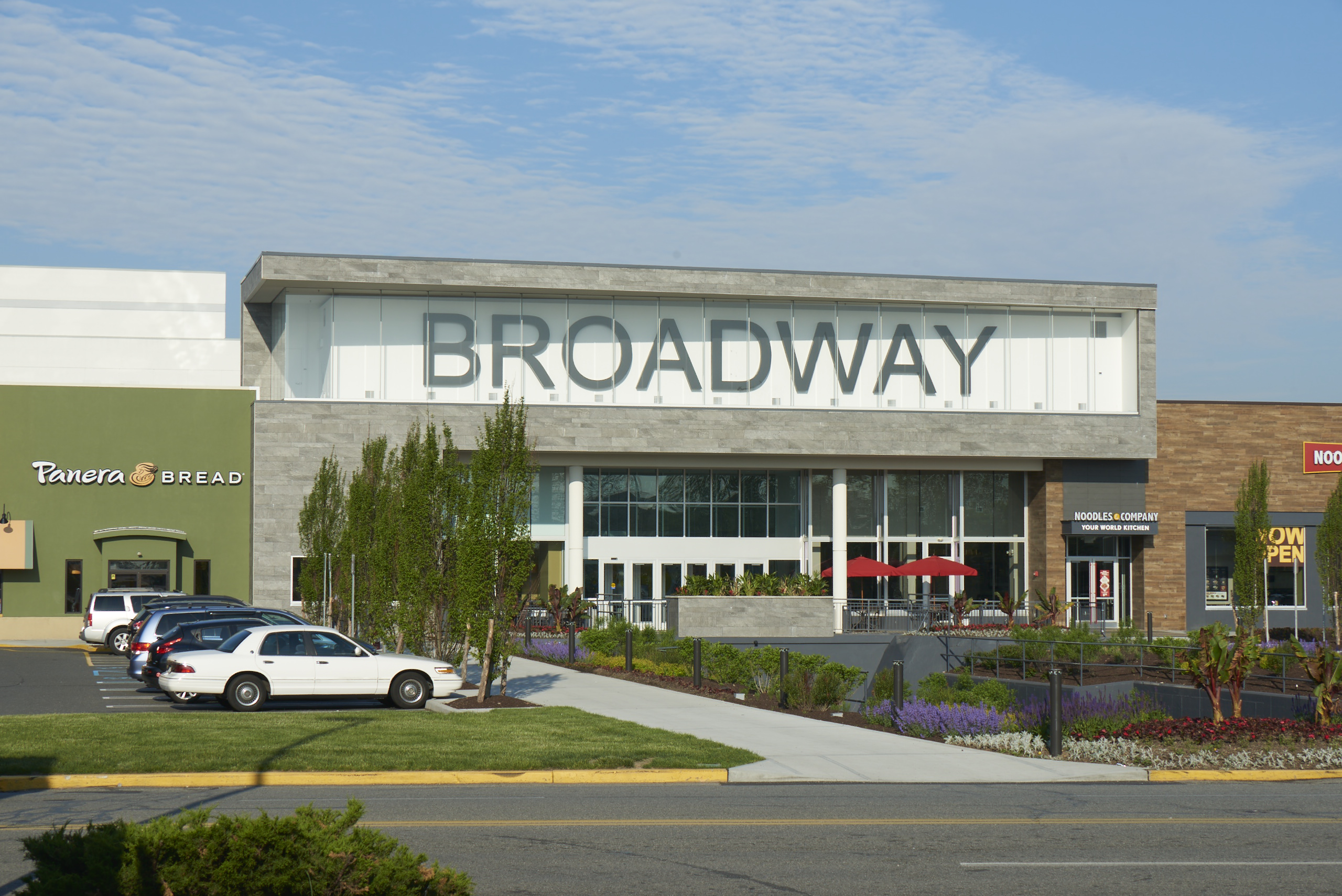
Broadway Mall in 2016

Metalab Equipment Company, a division of Norbute Corp, made laboratory furniture and cabinetry. Alsy Manufacturing manufactured electric lamps and lampshades from 1975 through 1991.

The Rubber Company of America (RUCO) built a manufacturing site in 1945. RUCO Polymer Corp. (Hooker Chemical Company) manufactured plastics, latex, and esters. Occidental Chemical Corporation (OCC) owned and operated this site from 1966 to 1982. The site was purchased by Sybron Corporation, then in 2000, the Bayer Corporation (Bayer MaterialScience) purchased the Hooker Ruco facility and in 2002 decided to close the facility. The facility was a freight customer of the Long Island Rail Road and New York and Atlantic Railway, served by a spur track off the Main Line next to the grade crossing at New South Road. The site was used for the production of polyester from 1982 until 2002. The LIRR removed the switch during track work sometime after the closure and demolition of the buildings on the property. The property remains fenced-off and vacant currently.

The presence of a major LIRR hub means that Hicksville developed as a major bedroom community of New York City. The LIRR has a team yard on West John Street, just east of Charlotte Avenue, served by the New York and Atlantic Railway, for off-line freight customers receiving or shipping cargo by rail to anywhere in the North American rail network.

Hicksville's North Broadway, positioned in the center of Nassau County, developed into a significant retail center. North Broadway was home to the Mid-Island Shopping Plaza (now known as Broadway Mall), a 156,000-square-foot Sears department store and auto center that closed in 2018, and various other restaurants and retail stores.

Hicksville is home to a number of South Asian grocery stores, clothing shops and restaurants, due to its large proportion of immigrants from India, Pakistan, and Bangladesh.

=== Business with headquarters in Hicksville ===
- Sam Ash Music

== Demographics ==
Asian culture in Hicksville

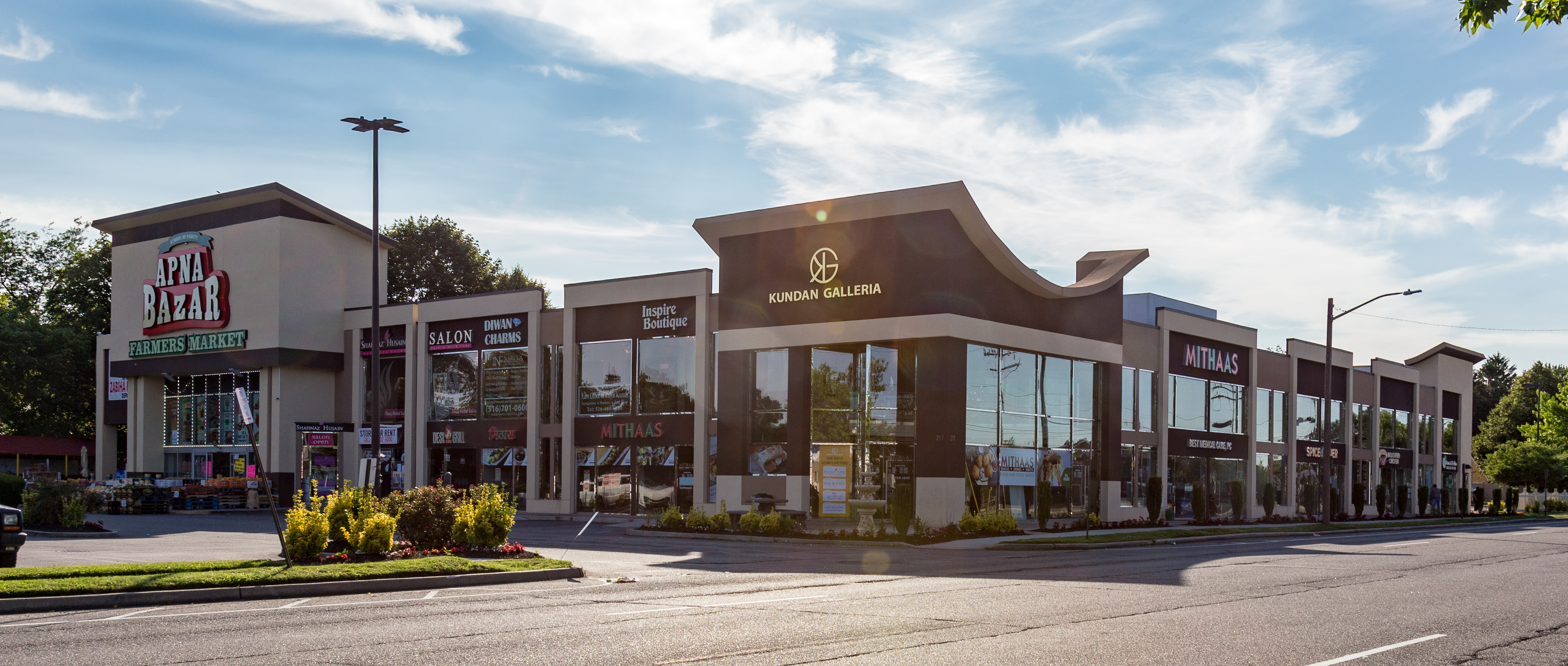
A South Asian shopping center

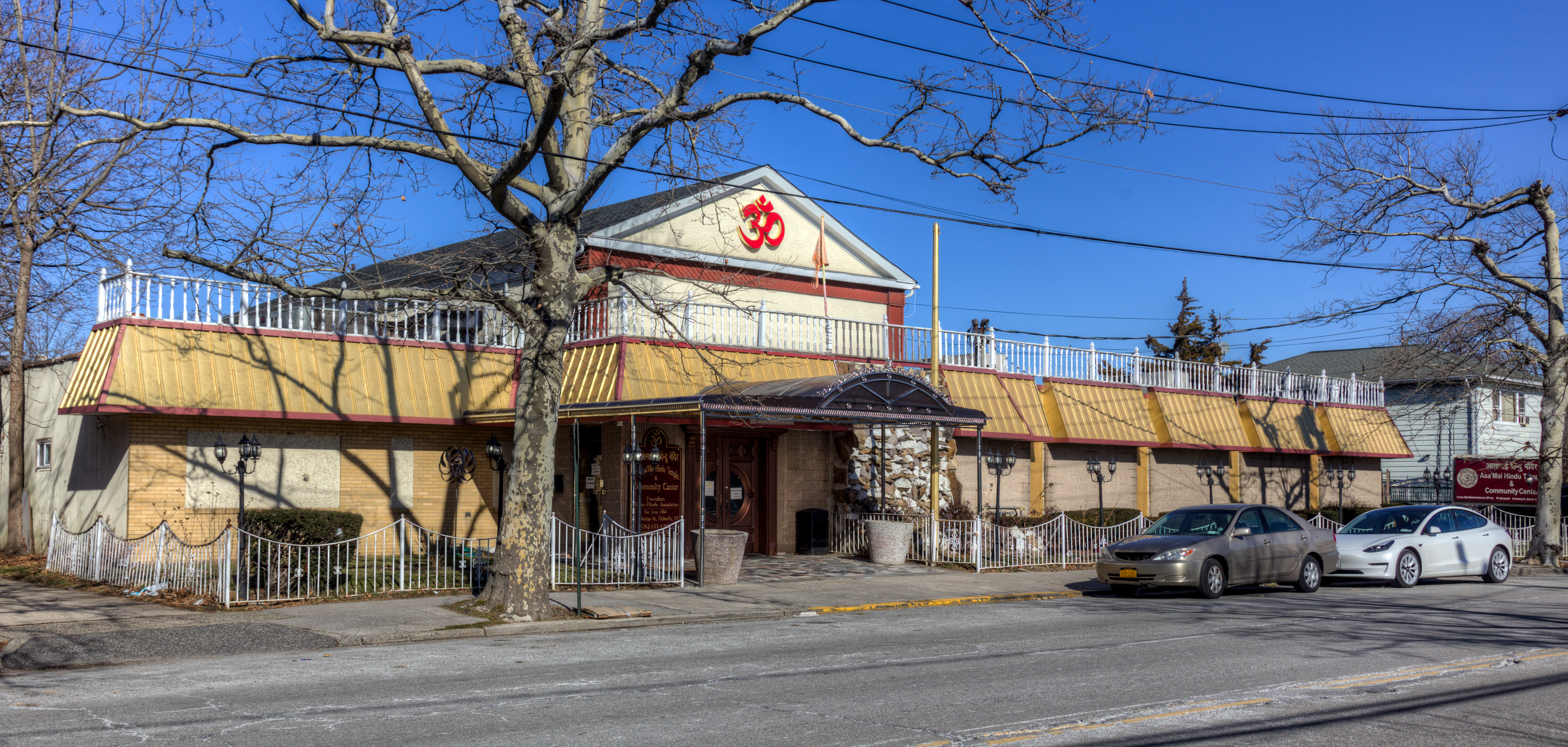
Shri Asa'Mai Hindu temple

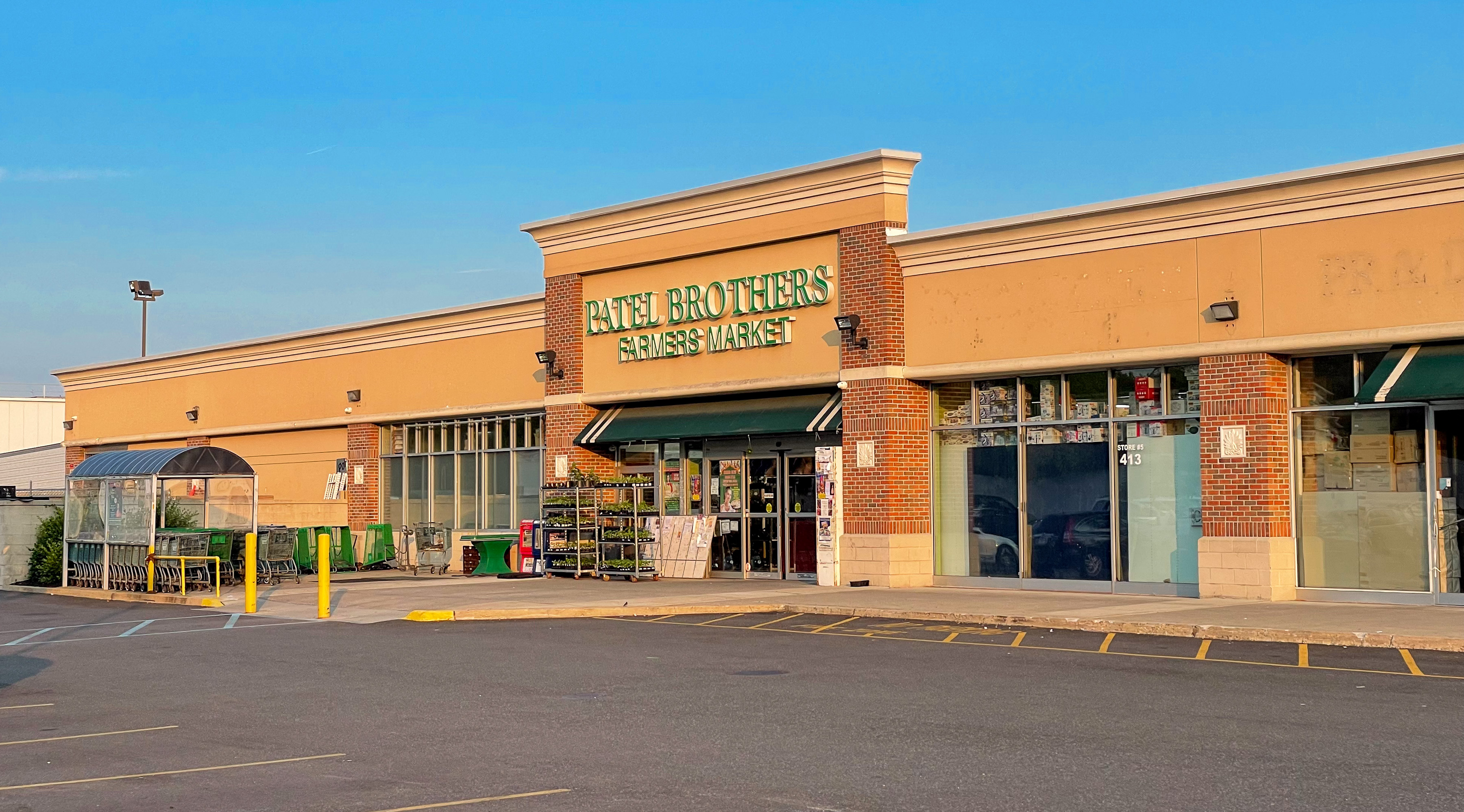
A South Asian market

=== Racial and ethnic composition ===
Hicksville CDP, New York – Racial and ethnic composition Note: the US Census treats Hispanic/Latino as an ethnic category. This table excludes Latinos from the racial categories and assigns them to a separate category. Hispanics/Latinos may be of any race.
Race / Ethnicity (NH = Non-Hispanic)	Pop 2000	Pop 2010	Pop 2020	% 2000	% 2010	% 2020
White alone (NH)	32,645	25,603	19,073	79.12%	61.62%	43.48%
Black or African American alone (NH)	538	836	1,129	1.30%	2.01%	2.57%
Native American or Alaska Native alone (NH)	29	53	75	0.07%	0.13%	0.17%
Asian alone (NH)	3,714	8,139	14,178	9.00%	19.59%	32.32%
Native Hawaiian or Pacific Islander alone (NH)	11	3	7	0.03%	0.01%	0.02%
Other race alone (NH)	63	142	326	0.15%	0.34%	0.74%
Mixed race or Multiracial (NH)	441	728	1,078	1.07%	1.75%	2.46%
Hispanic or Latino (any race)	3,819	6,043	8,003	9.26%	14.54%	18.24%
Total	41,260	41,547	43,869	100.00%	100.00%	100.00%

=== 2020 census ===
As of the 2020 census, Hicksville had a population of 43,869 and 13,477 households. The population density was 6,458.9 people per square mile. The median age was 42.2 years. 18.4% of residents were under the age of 18 and 18.0% were 65 years of age or older. For every 100 females there were 99.4 males, and for every 100 females age 18 and over there were 97.6 males age 18 and over.

100.0% of residents lived in urban areas, while 0.0% lived in rural areas.

There were 13,477 households, of which 32.4% had children under the age of 18 living in them. Of all households, 61.0% were married-couple households, 14.8% were households with a male householder and no spouse or partner present, and 20.8% were households with a female householder and no spouse or partner present. About 16.2% of all households were made up of individuals and 9.2% had someone living alone who was 65 years of age or older.

There were 13,889 housing units, of which 3.0% were vacant. The homeowner vacancy rate was 0.8% and the rental vacancy rate was 4.4%.

Racial composition as of the 2020 census
Race	Number	Percent
White	20,276	46.2%
Black or African American	1,193	2.7%
American Indian and Alaska Native	195	0.4%
Asian	14,216	32.4%
Native Hawaiian and Other Pacific Islander	12	0.0%
Some other race	4,225	9.6%
Two or more races	3,752	8.6%
Hispanic or Latino (of any race)	8,003	18.2%

=== Income and poverty ===
For the period 2017–2021, the median annual income for a household in the CDP was $123,230. The per capita income for the CDP was $46,504. About 4.1% of people were below the poverty line.

=== Asian population growth ===
By 1996 there were around four to five restaurants in Hicksville serving South Asian cuisine, and this started the ascent of a "Little India" there.

Between 2010 and 2020, Asian populations in Hicksville grew faster than the population as a whole. During this period, Hicksville's Asian population grew from 8,139 to 14,178, comprising 32.3% of the town's population. By 2020, Hicksville had become "a hub" of Indian-American life, with multiple South Asian grocery stores, clothing shops, and restaurants, serving the religious, economic, financial, and cultural needs of its many South Asian residents.

== Government ==
As an unincorporated hamlet within the Town of Oyster Bay, Hicksville is governed directly by the town's government, which is seated in Oyster Bay.

=== Politics ===
In the 2024 U.S. presidential election, the majority of Hicksville voters voted for Donald J. Trump (R).

== Education ==
Schools and Library

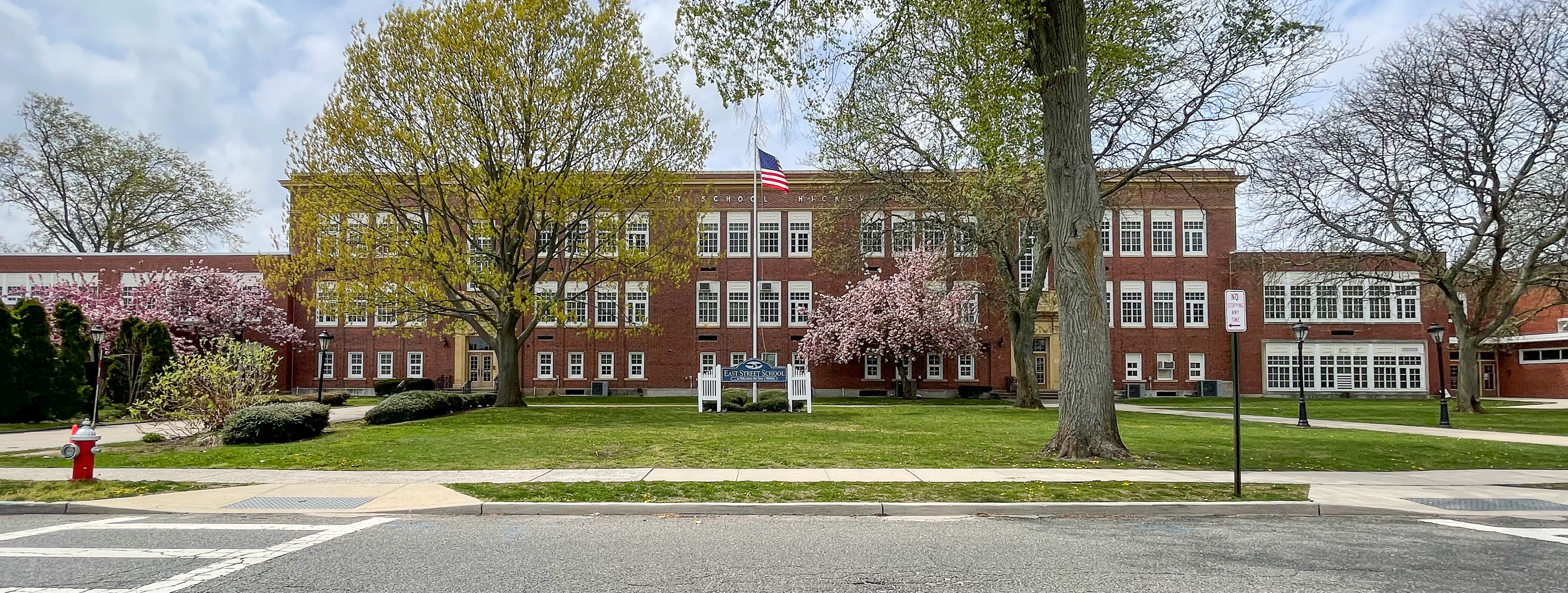
East Street Elementary School

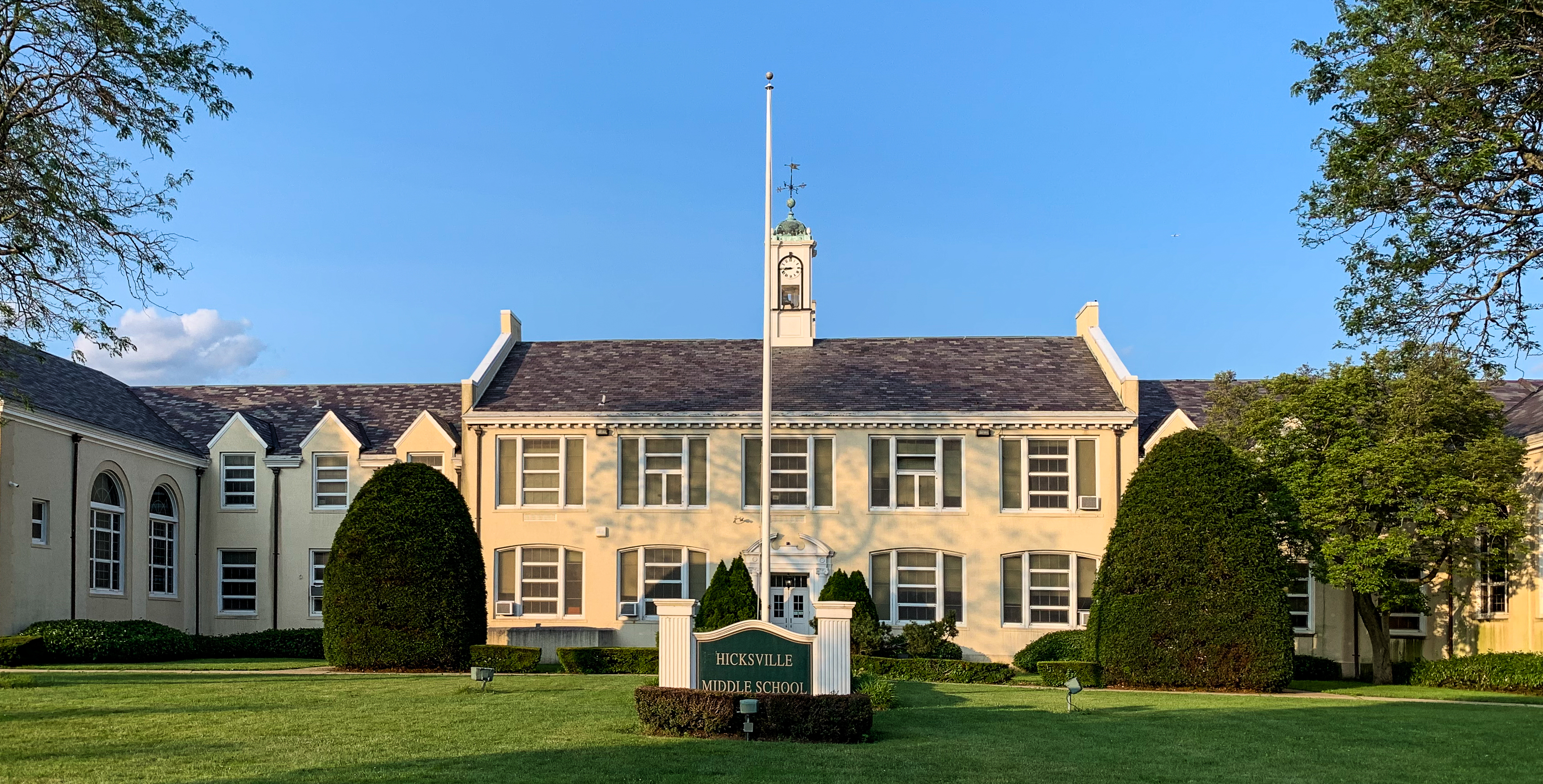
Middle School

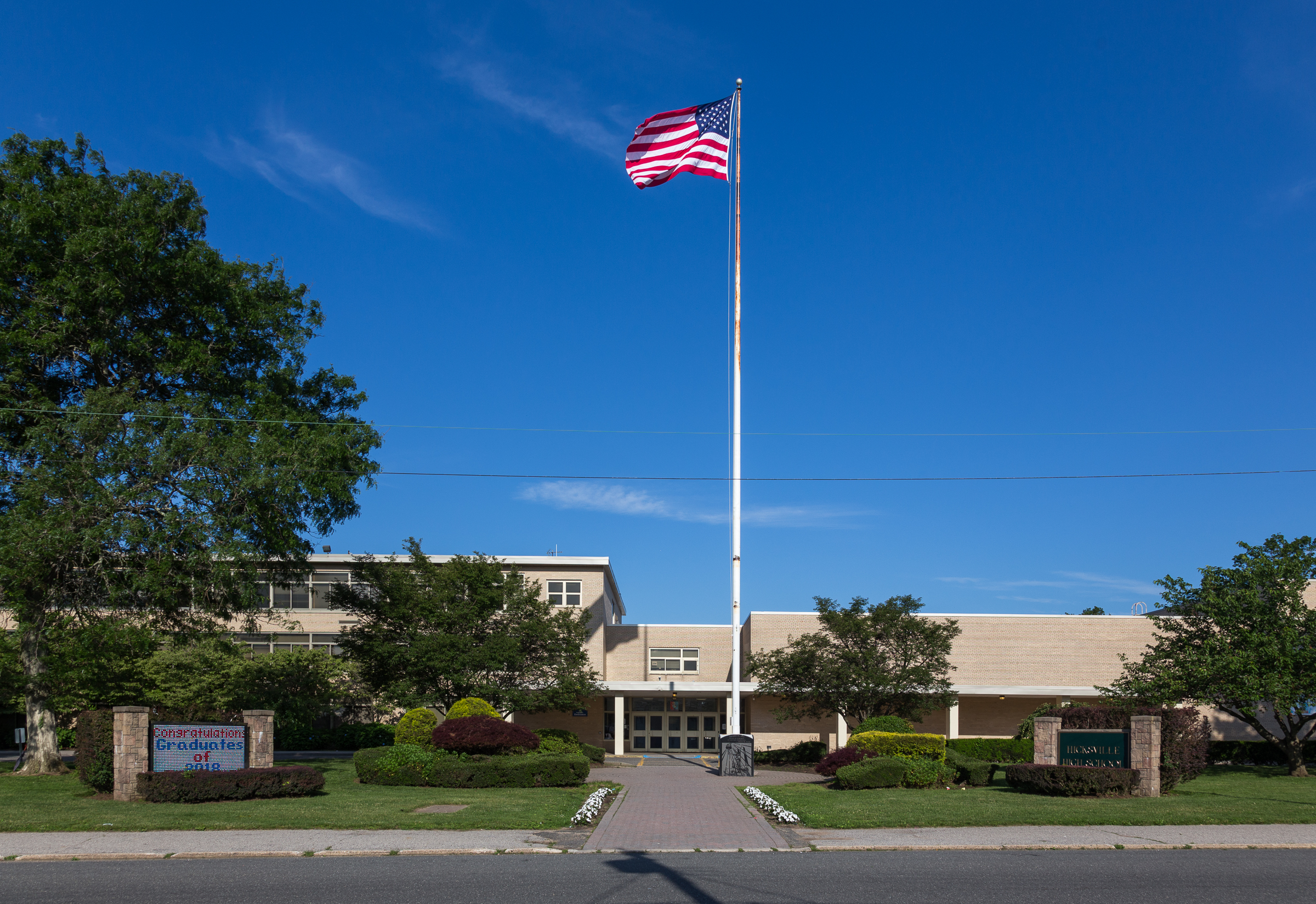
Hicksville High School

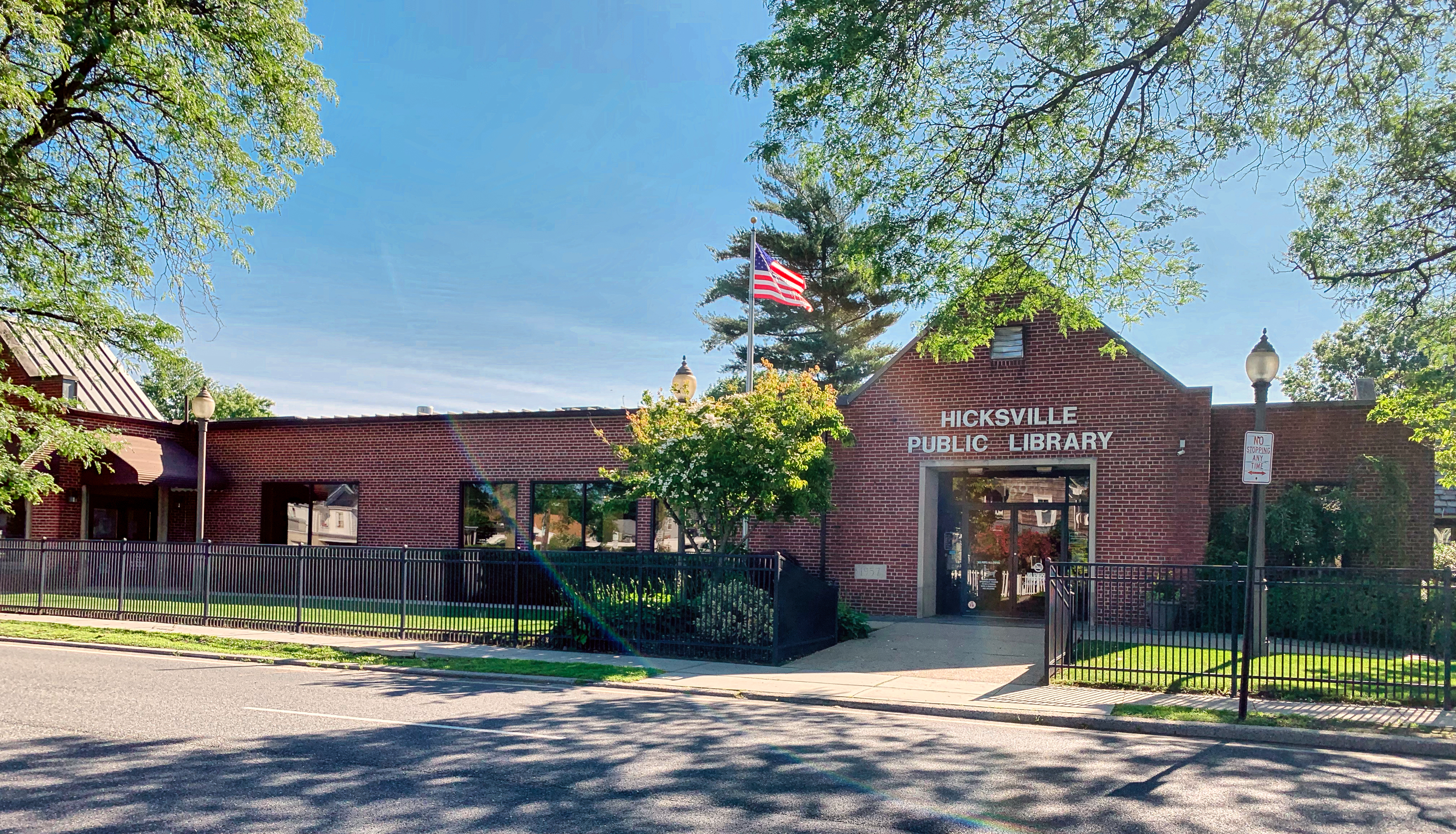
Hicksville Public Library

=== School districts ===
Hicksville is primarily located within the boundaries of the Hicksville Union Free School District. However, a small part of the hamlet's southeastern corner is located within the boundaries of the Bethpage Union Free School District while a small portion of the hamlet's northeastern corner is located within the boundaries of the Syosset Central School District. As such, children who reside within Hicksville and attend public schools go to school in one of these three districts depending on where they live within the hamlet. In 2023, Hicksville High School was ranked in the top 30% of New York schools by the National Center for Education Statistics.

=== Library districts ===
Hicksville is located within the boundaries of (and is thus served by) the Hicksville Library District, the Bethpage Library District, and the Syosset Library District. The boundaries of these three districts within the hamlet roughly correspond to those of the three school districts.

== Transportation ==
=== Road ===
Four state-owned roads pass through the hamlet: New York State Route 106, New York State Route 107, the Northern State Parkway, and the Wantagh State Parkway. Additionally, the Northern State Parkway forms portions of the hamlet's northern border.

Other major roads within the hamlet include Jerusalem Avenue, Old Country Road, Plainview Road, Woodbury Road, and South Oyster Bay Road.

=== Rail ===
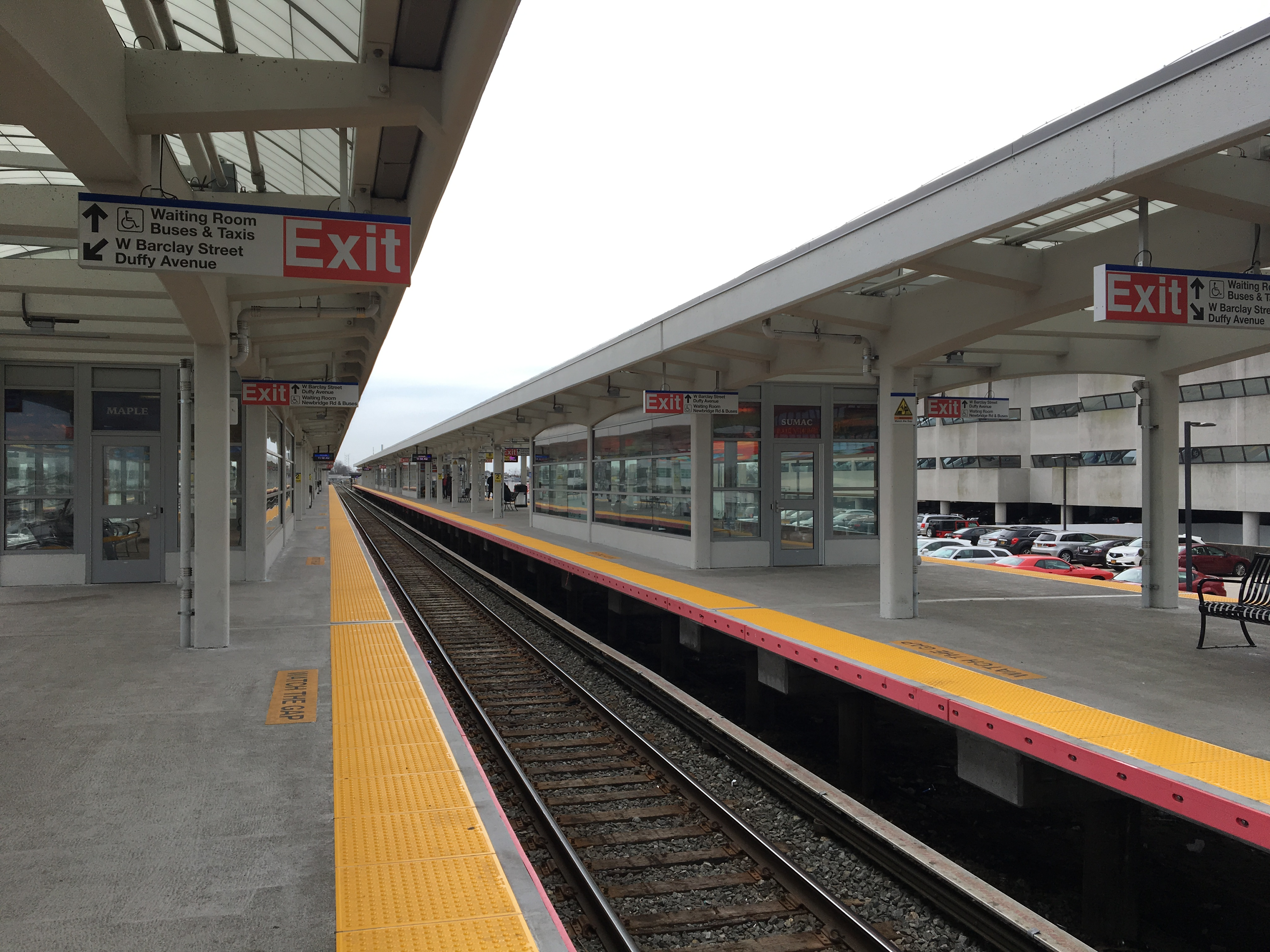
The Hicksville LIRR station, looking down the middle track

Hicksville is a major hub on the Long Island Rail Road, where the Ronkonkoma Branch meets with the Port Jefferson Branch to form the Main Line.

=== Bus ===
The area is also a hub for the following routes operated by Nassau Inter-County Express and Suffolk County Transit:

- n20H: Great Neck – Hicksville via Northern Blvd
- n22: Hicksville – Jamaica via Prospect Avenue/Hillside Avenue
- n24: Hicksville – Jamaica via Old Country Road/Jericho Turnpike
- n48: Hicksville – Hempstead via Carman Avenue
- n49: Hicksville – Hempstead via Newbridge Road
- n78: Hicksville – Plainview via Old Country Road
- n79: Hicksville – Huntington, New York Walt Whitman Mall and Shops via Old Country Road
- n80: Hicksville – Massapequa Park via Hicksville Road
- Long Island Express: Hicksville – Riverhead via Ronkonkoma

== Public safety ==
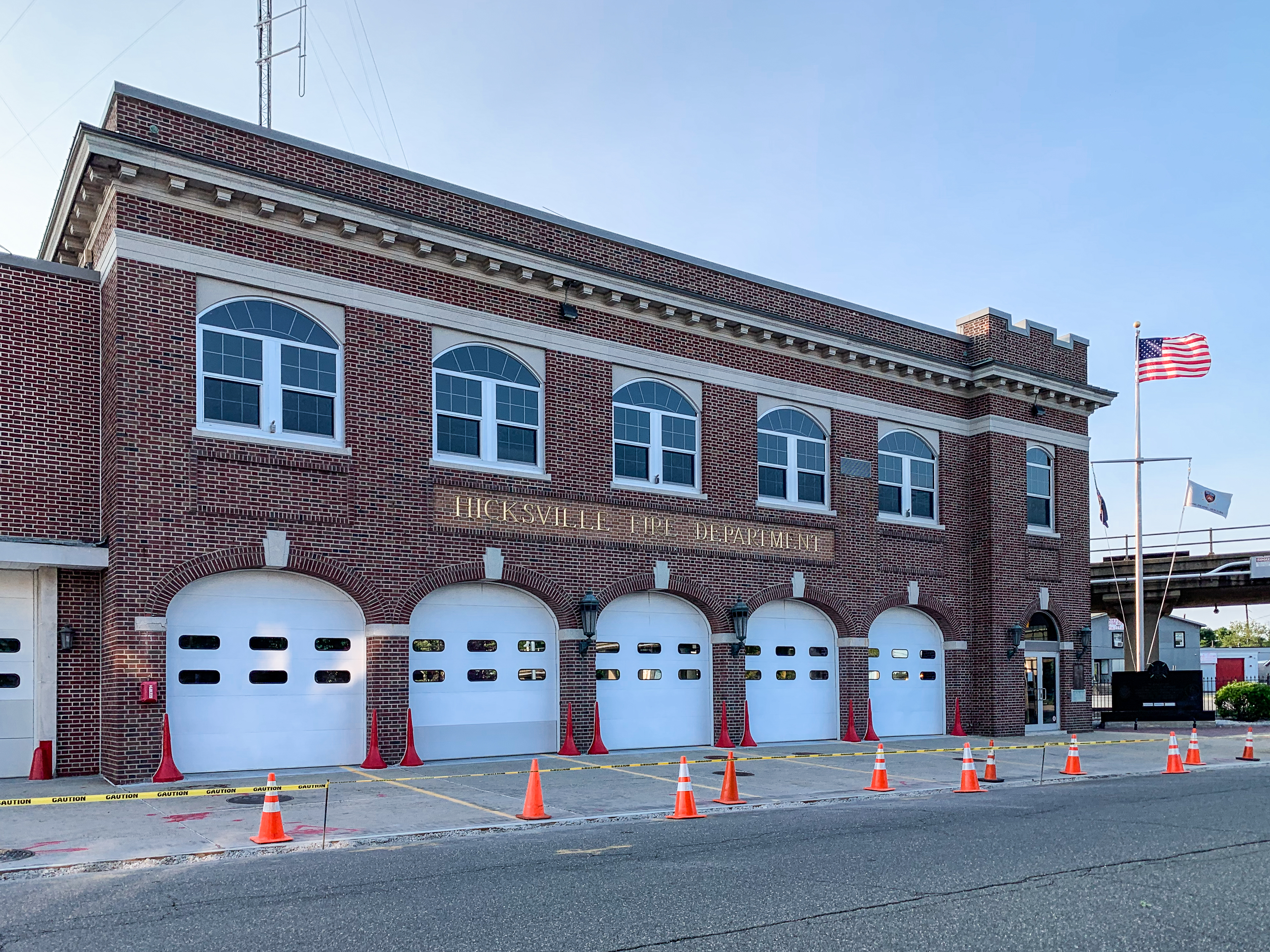
The Hicksville Fire Department's headquarters in 2019

Hicksville's fire protection is provided by the Hicksville Fire Department. Its police protection comes from the Nassau County Police Department's 2nd and 8th precincts, as well as the MTA Police and Nassau County Auxiliary Police.

== Notable people ==
- Tyler Arnone, soccer player
- Lorraine Bracco, actress; best known for her roles in Goodfellas and The Sopranos
- Theresa Caputo, purported medium; star of Long Island Medium
- Michael Collins, soccer player who represented the United States national team
- Denny Dias, former guitarist for Steely Dan
- Larry Eisenhauer, professional football player
- Frank Gerwer, professional skateboarder
- Billy Joel, singer and musician
- Maura Johnston, writer and academic
- Mitch Kupchak, professional basketball executive and former player
- The Lemon Twigs, indie rock band
- Dennis Michael Lynch, businessman and filmmaker
- Don Murphy, film producer
- Tim Parker, professional soccer player
- Dave Pietramala, defensive coordinator for University of North Carolina men's lacrosse team
- Al Pitrelli, Megadeth and Trans-Siberian Orchestra guitarist
- Steve Rosenthal, labor and political strategist
- Al Sarrantonio, science fiction author
- Gary D. Schmidt, author
- Robert Shulman, serial killer
- Rob Walker, politician and legislator
- Christian Beale, musician and audio technician

== See also ==
- Heitz Place Courthouse
