= Naval Weapons Industrial Reserve Plant, Dallas =

- Part of United States Navy
- Dallas, Texas

Site information
- Type: Weapons Plant
- Controlled by: United States Navy
- Open to the public: No

Location
- Coordinates: 32°44′27″N 96°58′47″W

Naval Weapons Industrial Reserve Plant, Dallas (NWIRP) was a government-owned, contractor-operated (GOCO) facility operating from 1941 to 2014 which had the mission of designing, fabricating, and testing prototype weapons and equipment, and is located in Dallas, Texas. The NWIRP first began as an aerospace manufacturing complex constructed for the World War II mobilization program. In 2012, the plant was sold to a private corporation for $357,500. It was located for most of its time next to Naval Air Station Dallas, now known as the Grand Prairie Armed Forces Reserve Complex.

== History as a Military Facility ==
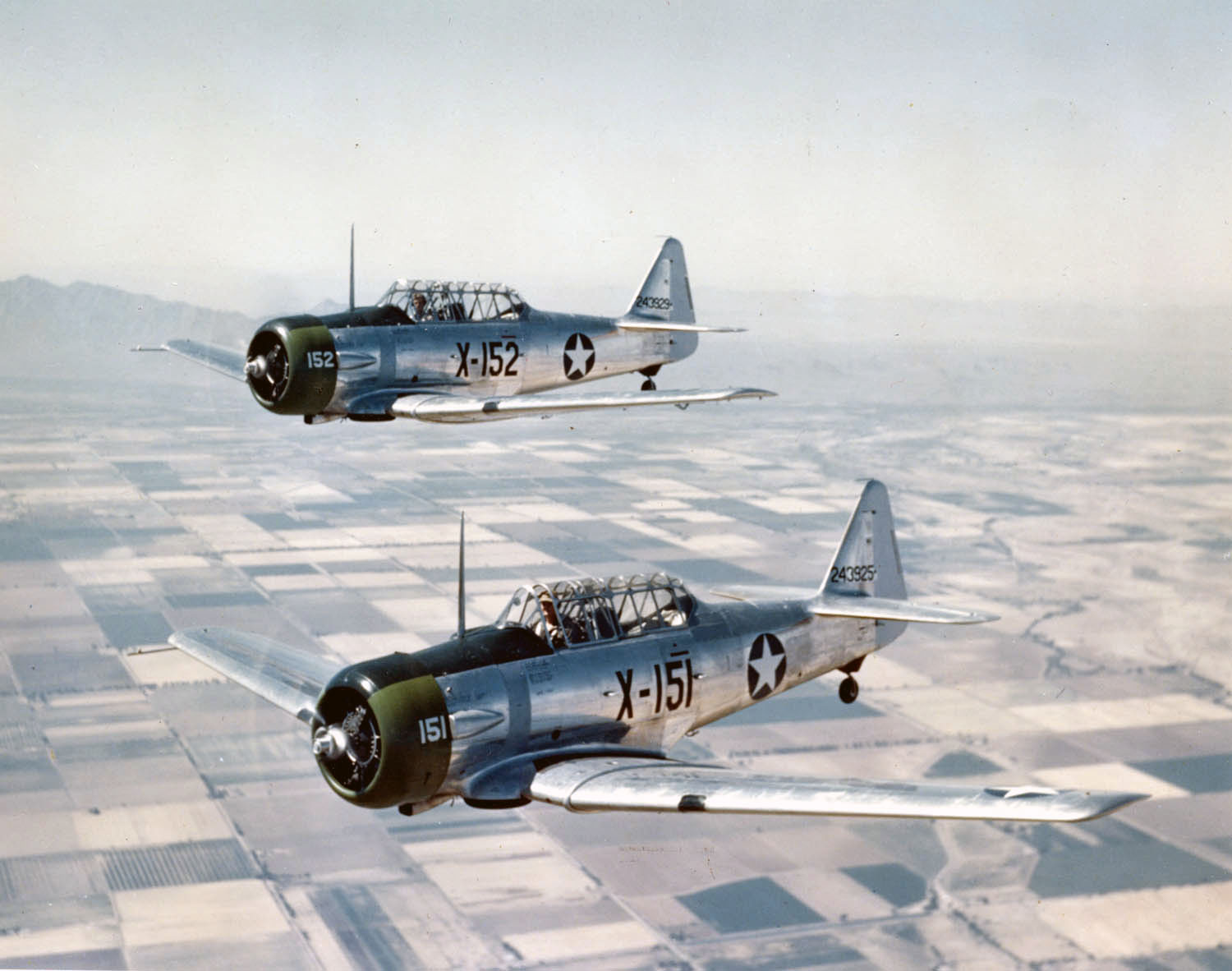
The T-6 Texan plane was originally developed on the Naval Weapons Industrial Reserve in Dallas Texas. It was used to train the Royal Air Force and U.S Armed Forces.

The Naval Weapons Industrial Reserve Plant, Dallas was originally named Plancor No.25, more commonly known as North American Aviation Dallas at Grand Prairie, in 1941. During its times of operation, they have supported World War II and Cold War warfighters with innovative armaments, space exploration program with NASA, and the Department of Defense acquisition enterprise. The plant itself consisted of about 85 federal buildings that stretched over 153 acres of land in Dallas and Grand Prairie, Texas.

On Sept. 28, 1940, North American broke ground on the new plant; it was dedicated on April 7, 1941. From August 1941 to August 1945, North American Aviation Dallas leased the government owned contractor-operated plant and produced three aircraft in support of World War II: the North American T-6 Texan, the North American P-51 Mustang and the Consolidated B-24 Liberator bomber. During this period the plant produced 12,967 Texas trainers, 4,790 Mustangs, and 966 Liberator bombers. The plant "was the first of the emergency expansion facilities financed by the United States government, making it the prototype example of such a facility" and in terms of units, produced more aircraft than any other wartime factory. In addition to the plant, housing was needed for the thousands moving to Grand Prairie to work at the plant, so the federal government built Avion Village, a $1 million housing development of 300 homes in Grand Prairie. The plant was significant in transforming the city of Dallas into an industrial center.

Post World War II from about 1946 to 1960 the facility was used by Texas Engineering and Manufacturing Company (Temco Aircraft) and Chance Vought Aviation.

== Water Contamination ==
During the 1940s, the Naval Weapons Industrial Reserve Plant released volatile substances of petroleum products, volatile organic compounds (VOCs), polychlorinated biphenyls (PCBs), metals, and other hazardous chemicals (zinc, lead, and chromium) into Mountain Creek Lake and other neighboring water ways. The primary use of these chemical substances were for the fabrication of aircraft, aerospace equipment, and prototype weapons. This contaminated release from the facility occurred from building productions on the plant, aircraft operations, solid waste management units, and various storage areas. In the 1980s, a Resource Conservation and Recovery Act (RCRA) was conducted at the plant to confirm that there was contamination from the substances found in surface waters, groundwater, soils, and sediments in Mountain Creek Lake and surrounding areas. The Department of Defense (DOD) was then notified about the NWIRP hazardous water contamination in 1991.

Mountain Creek Lake consisted of high levels of dioxins and polychlorinated biphenyls (PCBs) found in fish tissue, which therefore initiated Aquatic Life order Number 12, a ban of any possession or consumption of fish by the Texas Department of Health (TDH). The primary mechanism for the release of the substances from the facility were through site operations, waste disposal, leaks, and spills. Stormwater and ground water runoff released substances into Mountain Creek Lake, which then flowed into Cottonwood Bay through a connected canal. Surrounding wildlife, including bird species and plants, had possible ecological exposure through the contaminated surface water, sediments, and soil by ingestion, foraging, and direct/indirect contact.

The groundwater in the shallow aquifer at the Naval Weapons Industrial Reserve Plant in Dallas, Texas also confirmed contamination with organic solvents such as trichloroethylene and its degrading products, dichloroethylene and vinyl chloride, and metal chromium. The aquifer identified at NWIRP consisted of fine alluvial sediments of clay, sand, and silt, with a bedrock shale along the bottom, creating an underlying enclosed unit. Using portable geophysical well-logging equipment containing natural gamma-ray and EM-induction sonde, 162 polyvinyl-chloride-cased wells at NWIRP were logged for contamination during July and August 1997. The chemical analysis of the tested wells produced a high level of trichloroethane up to 27,000 micrograms per liter.

== Closure and Redevelopment ==
Triumph Aerostructures announced that the aircraft manufacturing plant would close in early February 2014 after 73 years of operation. After two years of redevelopment, The Home Depot opened a large distribution center on the site in 2021.
