= Clinton Road station =

Train station in New York, US (1915–53)

Clinton Road
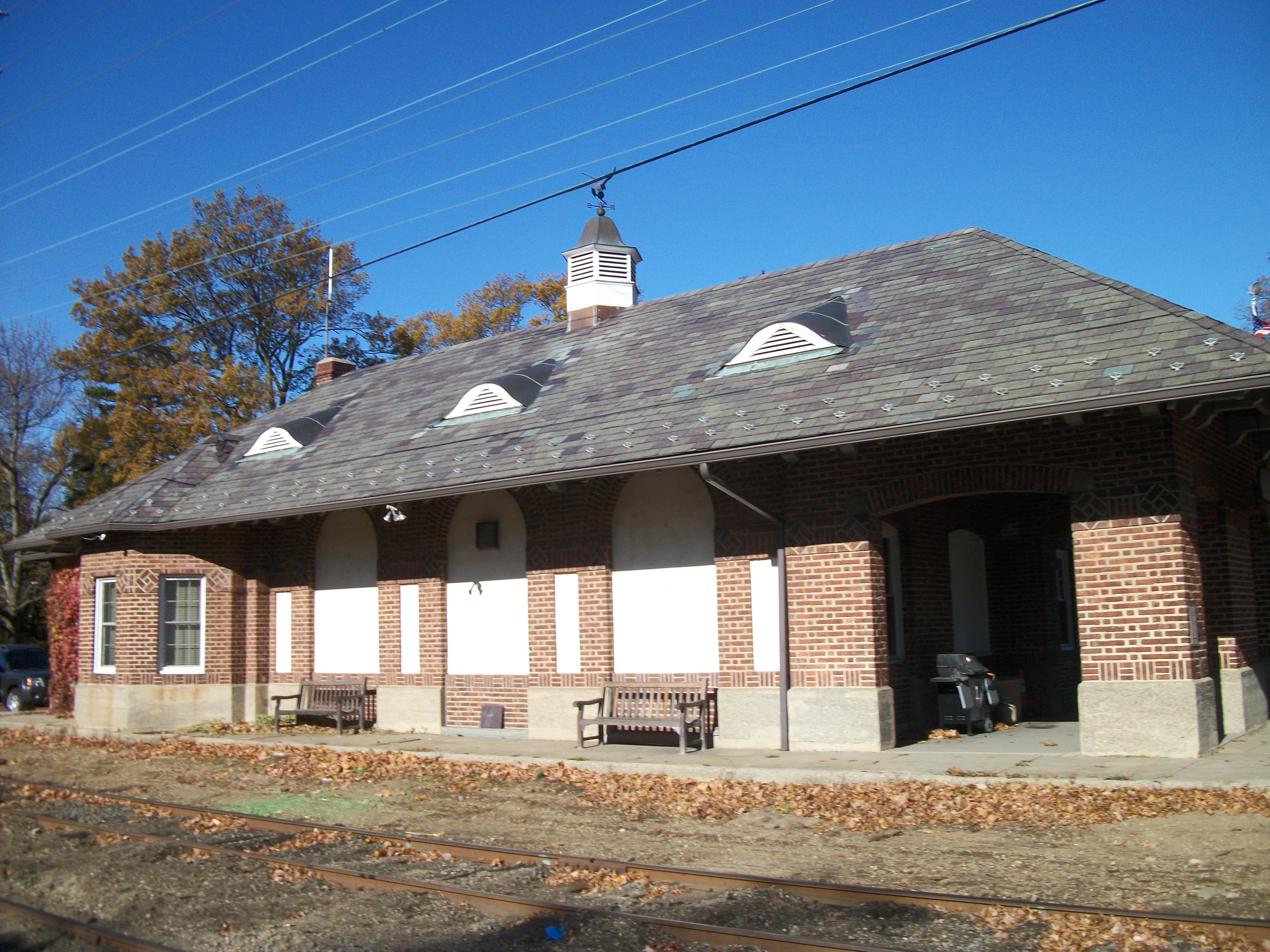
- The former station house in 2013

General information
- Location: Clinton Road (CR 1) and Saint James Street North; Garden City, New York
- Coordinates: 40°43′39″N 73°37′16″W
- Owner: Metropolitan Transportation Authority (tracks); Incorporated Village of Garden City (station house)
- Line: Garden City–Mitchel Field Secondary
- Platforms: 2 side platforms
- Tracks: 2

History
- Opened: 1915
- Closed: May 15, 1953

Former services
Preceding station	Long Island Rail Road	Following station
Country Life Press Terminus	Garden City–Mitchel Field Secondary	Newsday After 1949 toward Bethpage
Country Life Press Terminus	Garden City–Mitchel Field Secondary	A&P toward Bethpage
Location

Clinton Road was a railroad station in the Village of Garden City in Nassau County, New York, United States. The former Long Island Rail Road station on the Garden City–Mitchel Field Secondary was built in anticipation of residential development on the eastern side of Garden City. Passenger service began in 1915 and ended on May 15, 1953. The former station building has been used as a fire station by the Garden City Fire Department since the 1950s.

== History ==
In 1910, the Garden City Company prepared plans for the development of the eastern side of the Village of Garden City, which included a new train station at Clinton Road. The plans called for a brick station building with a semicircular brick plaza and a park extending north to Stewart Avenue. The station stood along the former Central Railroad of Long Island, which Alexander Turney Stewart had built in 1873. Construction of the station building has been dated to 1911 by Robert Emery. (Note: According to Paul S. Luchter, Robert Emery dated the station building to 1911. Luchter considered the date consistent with construction evidence of other nearby railroad infrastructure. A 1912 article describing the Hempstead Plains Aerodrome also referred to the station as recently built.) The structure initially sat vacant until there was enough residential construction to warrant its opening. Train service at the new station began in 1915, when the Long Island Rail Road (LIRR) began operating a trolley service along the line between the Garden City and Clinton Road stations.

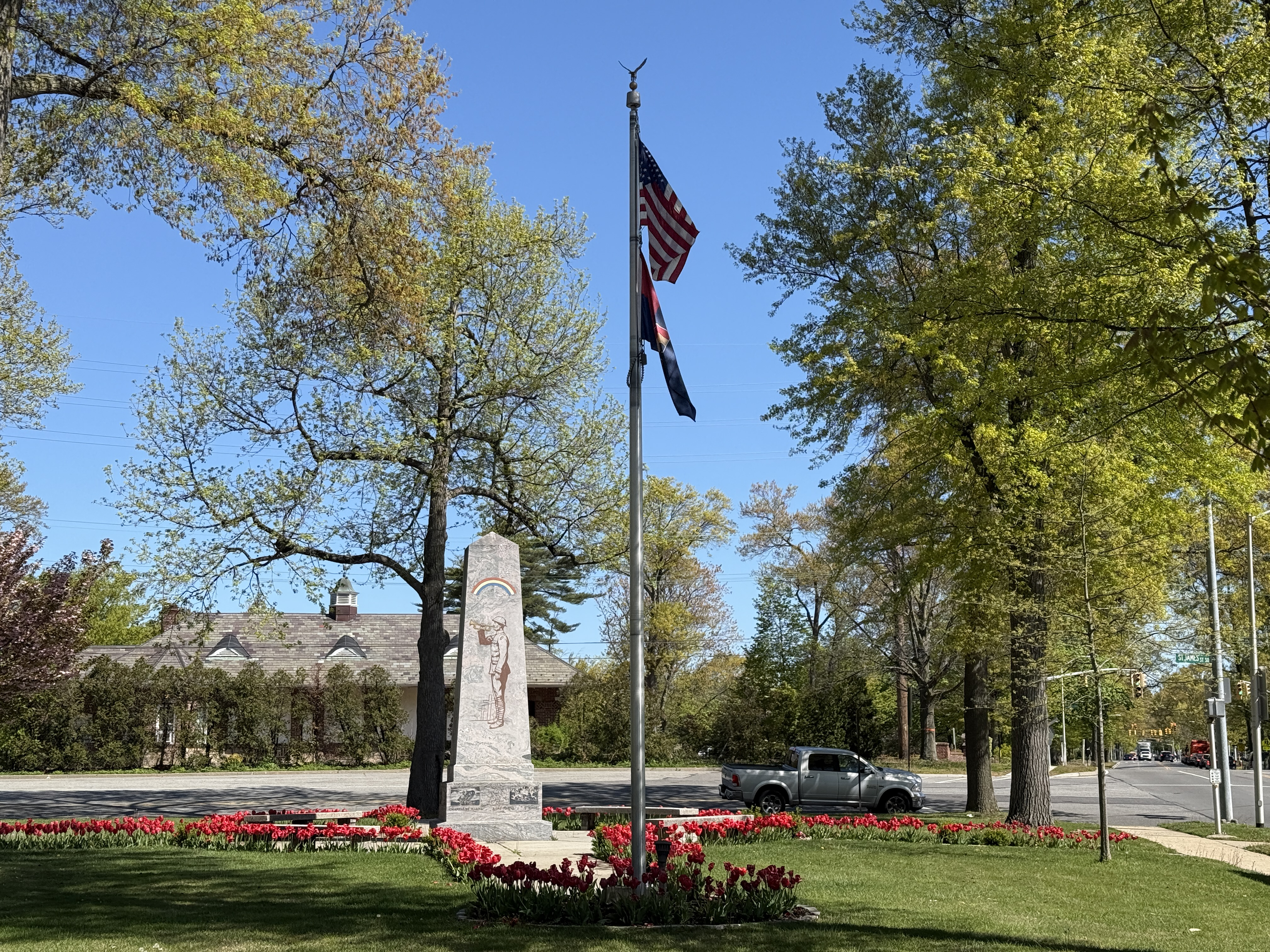
Rainbow Monument Park in 2026, with the former station house visible in the background

During World War I, the station building served as a telegraph and paymaster station for Camp Mills, which had been established on the east side of Clinton Road and the south side of the Central Railroad. A monument to the Rainbow Division that was assembled at Camp Mills and fought overseas in France was erected in Rainbow Monument Park on the south side of the station in 1941.

The station saw very low ridership when service was eventually limited to shuttle trains running between Country Life Press and Mitchel Field. The shuttle consisted of a two-car train operated by a crew of three. It had to stop at each of the two unprotected grade crossings located along its route—including the one at Clinton Road—where the crew had to get off to flag down vehicles so the train could pass. The shuttle charged a five-cent fare, collected in cash aboard the train rather than through the railroad's regular ticketing system. According to a Newsday article published in 1951, LIRR records showed that the station had never sold a ticket.

The former station house in 2013, now Station No. 3 of the Garden City Fire Department

By 1951, the eastern side of Garden City was starting to become heavily developed. At the time, the Garden City Fire Department was not able to efficiently serve the east side of the village, due to the existing two fire stations not being in adequate proximity to the area. This prompted the Village of Garden City to purchase the station building that year and subsequently convert it into a third fire station.

In 1952, the LIRR petitioned the New York State Public Service Commission (PSC) for permission to discontinue passenger service on its shuttle between Country Life Press and Mitchel Field stations and to close the intermediate stations, including Clinton Road. The railroad cited declining ridership, reported an operating loss of nearly $19,000 in 1951, and said it expected further losses. It also argued that a bus route operating from Hempstead to Mitchel Field served the same corridor. The LIRR had attempted to discontinue the shuttle approximately a decade earlier, but the PSC had denied permission because no alternative transportation service was available. In March 1953, the PSC authorized the railroad to discontinue the service after providing 30 days' public notice.

Passenger service at the Clinton Road station ended on May 15, 1953. (Note: Passenger service at Clinton Road ended in 1953, but special trains continued to operate on the line to Roosevelt Raceway until 1961.) On its final trip, the train stopped at Clinton Road station, which had already been converted into a firehouse. A firefighter presented the crew with three packages and waved as the train departed for Country Life Press. Until then, the shuttle's crew had been delivering the daily newspapers to the firehouse each morning and afternoon.

As of 2026, the station building continues to be operated as Station No. 3 of the Garden City Fire Department. Station No. 3 contains one fire engine. The former station building has a hip roof with copper dormers and a weather vane tower.

== See also ==
- Long Island Rail Road stations
- History of the Long Island Rail Road
