= Camp Mills =

Military installation on Long Island, New York

Camp Mills Aviation Concentration Center
- Garden City, Long Island, New York
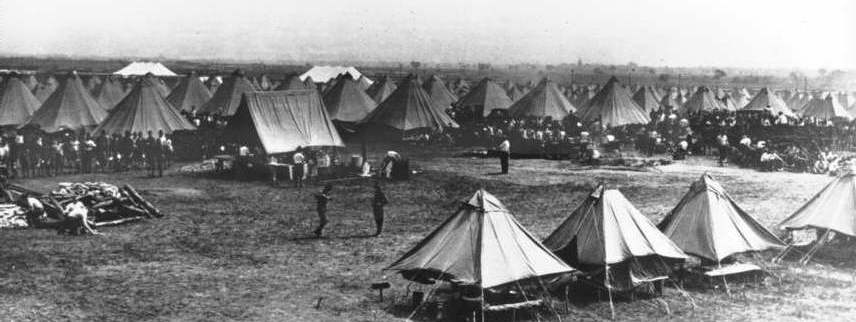
- Encampment of National Guard soldiers at Camp Mills, New York training for service in World War I

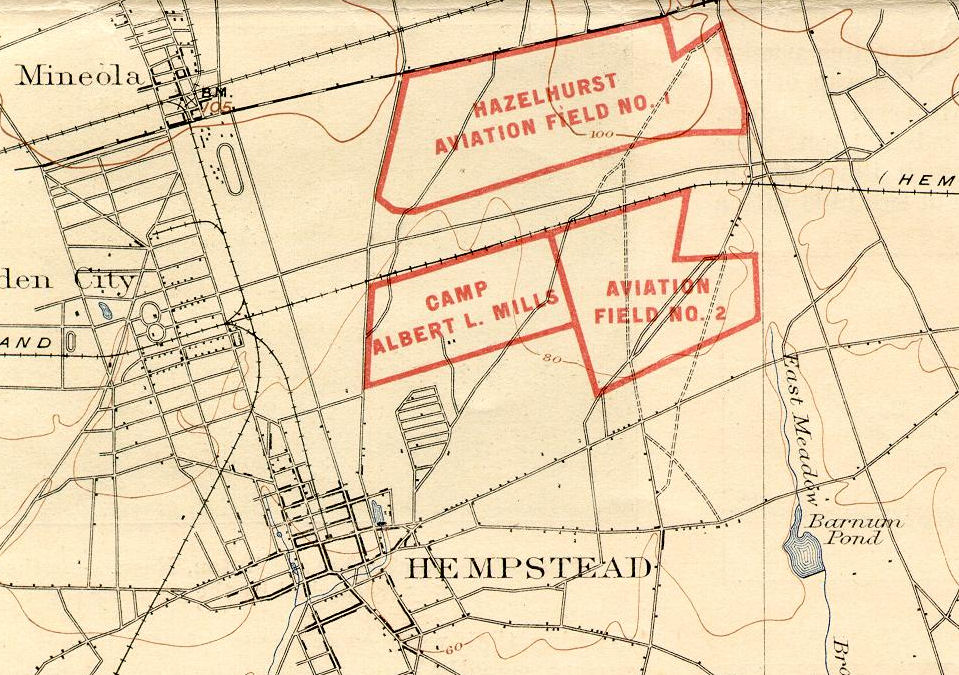
- Location of Camp Mills. Note location of Hazelhurst Field and Aviation Field #2, later becoming Mitchel Field

Location
- Coordinates: 40°43′32″N 73°36′58″W

Site history
- Built: 1917

Camp Albert L. Mills (more commonly known as Camp Mills) was a military installation on Long Island, New York. It was located about ten miles from the eastern boundary of New York City on the Hempstead Plains within what is now the village of Garden City. In September 1917, Camp Mills was named in honor of a former Superintendent of the United States Military Academy at West Point, Major General Albert L. Mills, who had suddenly died the year prior in September 1916. Mills had been awarded the Medal of Honor for gallantry during the Spanish–American War.

Camp Mills was one of three camps under control of the New York Port of Embarkation with a capacity for 40,000 transient troops. The facility was one of several military establishments built during World War I in the Mineola, New York, area that included the Aviation General Supply Depot and Concentration Camp; Hazelhurst Field (later Roosevelt Field) and Mitchel Field.

== History ==
The mission of Camp Mills was initially the preparation of Army units prior to their deployment to Europe in World War I. It was established as temporary tent camp in September 1917 as a place to mobilize the 42nd Division, made up of National Guard units from various states. After the 42d left for the Western Front in France, the 41st Division followed, occupying the camp from October to November 1917.

The camp was then ordered to be abandoned, but reestablished April 4, 1918, as a part of the New York Port of Embarkation at Hoboken, New Jersey to obtain additional facilities for troops in transit to Europe.

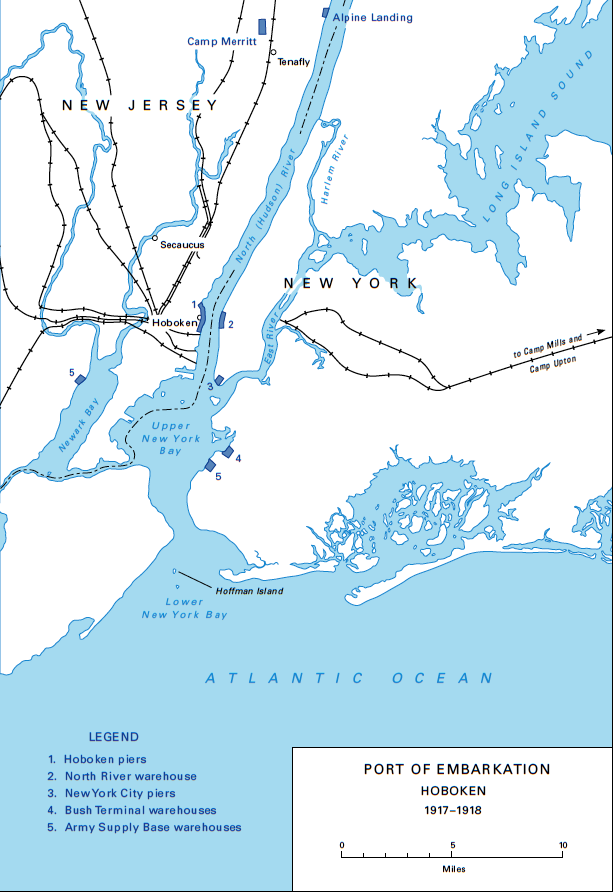
Camp Mills location within the Port of Embarkation Hoboken (1917–1918).

Camp Mills was expanded to a cantonment with wooden buildings for the accommodation of thousands of troops, who arrived from training camps across the United States. The units waited until they could be scheduled for embarkation whereupon they would travel by trains of the Long Island Rail Road (LIRR) to board ferryboats for the overseas piers in Brooklyn or Hoboken and loaded onto troop ships. Those ships transported troops primarily to the ports of Liverpool, England, or Brest, France. Facilities at

Camp Mills included a hospital, warehouses, bakery, delousing plant and other facilities. It eventually consisted of about 1,200 buildings with a capacity of 46,000, including space for 40,000 transients (about half in barracks, half in tents), a 500 inmate detention camp and 5,500 members of a permanent garrison.

A very large number of American soldiers shipped out to France from Camp Mills, at its peak in September 1918, over 31,000 troops were stationed there. Notable individuals who were assigned during World War I were: Douglas MacArthur, Wild Bill Donovan, Joyce Kilmer and Father Duffy among them. F. Scott Fitzgerald was a soldier at Camp Mills.

With the end of World War I in November 1918, Camp Mills served as a demobilization center processing thousands of troops back into the United States. When the last returned during the summer of 1919 the camp was ordered to be abandoned and sold, although operations continued until garrison troops were transferred elsewhere on March 31, 1920.

In 1938 Camp Mills was incorporated into Mitchel Field as part of an Air Corps expansion.

== Aviation Concentration Center ==
The Aviation General Supply Depot and Concentration Camp (Garden City) was a temporary wartime establishment located adjacent to Camp Mills, and shared many of its facilities. It was used for organizing, training, and equipping Air Service troops. Also originally a tent camp, it was established on 17 August 1917 to facilitate Air Service units for the purposes of embarkation to Europe, and after the armistice in November 1918, for the purposes of debarkation. The facility was later expanded with wooden buildings and turned into a containment.

The Concentration Center was under the jurisdiction of the Operations Section, Department of Military Aeronautics. It was later re-designated as the Air Service Depot from October 1918 to April 1919 when it was consolidated with Hazelhurst Field and made part of Mitchel Field on 5 April 1919.

== Today ==
Today, Camp Mills and the Aviation Concentration Center are a part of the urban community of the village of Garden City, and are totally unrecognizable from the urban area. In 1941, a monument to the Rainbow Division (42nd) was erected at Saint James Street and Rainbow Place in the plaza on the south side of the LIRR Clinton Road station. During World War I, the LIRR station building had served as a telegraph and paymaster station for Camp Mills. The monument was restored and then rededicated on November 11, 2004.
