= Nassau Boulevard station =

Long Island Rail Road station in Nassau County, New York

Nassau Blvd
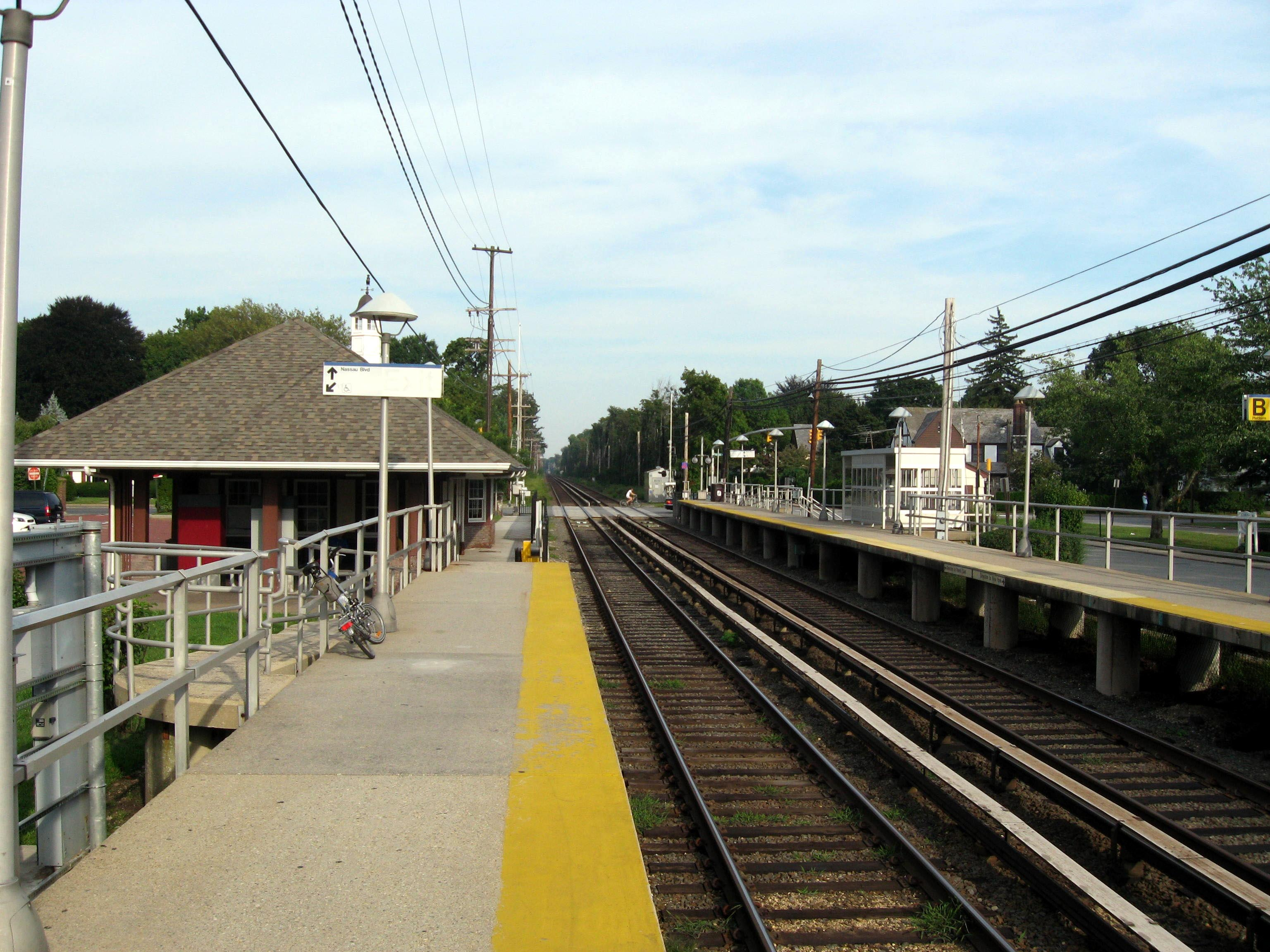
- Nassau Boulevard station, looking east from the westbound platform

General information
- Location: Nassau Boulevard & South Avenue; Garden City, New York
- Coordinates: 40.722933°N 73.662751°W
- Owner: Long Island Rail Road
- Line: Hempstead Branch
- Distance: 17.3 mi (27.8 km) from Long Island City
- Platforms: 2 side platforms
- Tracks: 2
- Bus routes: Adelphi University Shuttle

Construction
- Parking: Yes
- Accessible: Yes

Other information
- Station code: NBD
- Fare zone: 4

History
- Opened: 1907
- Electrified: May 26, 1908; 750 V (DC) third rail

Passengers
- 2012—2014: 1,709 per weekday

Services
Preceding station	Long Island Rail Road	Following station
Stewart Manor toward Penn Station, Grand Central or Atlantic Terminal	Hempstead Branch	Garden City toward Hempstead
Location

Nassau Boulevard is a station on the west side of Nassau Boulevard in Garden City, New York. It is one of five Long Island Rail Road stations located within the village.

== History ==
The station was built along the line of the former Central Railroad of Long Island. The station opened in 1907. It was instead built by the former village of Garden City Estates, which was merged with Garden City in 1915. In the early 2000s, the station underwent renovations, including installation of ramps.

== Station layout ==
The station has two slightly offset high-level side platforms, each 10 cars long. The station is near Adelphi University. There is parking at the station by local permit only. The pedestrian tunnel entrances resemble the former tunnel at the nearby Stewart Manor station.

== Image gallery ==
Nassau Boulevard station

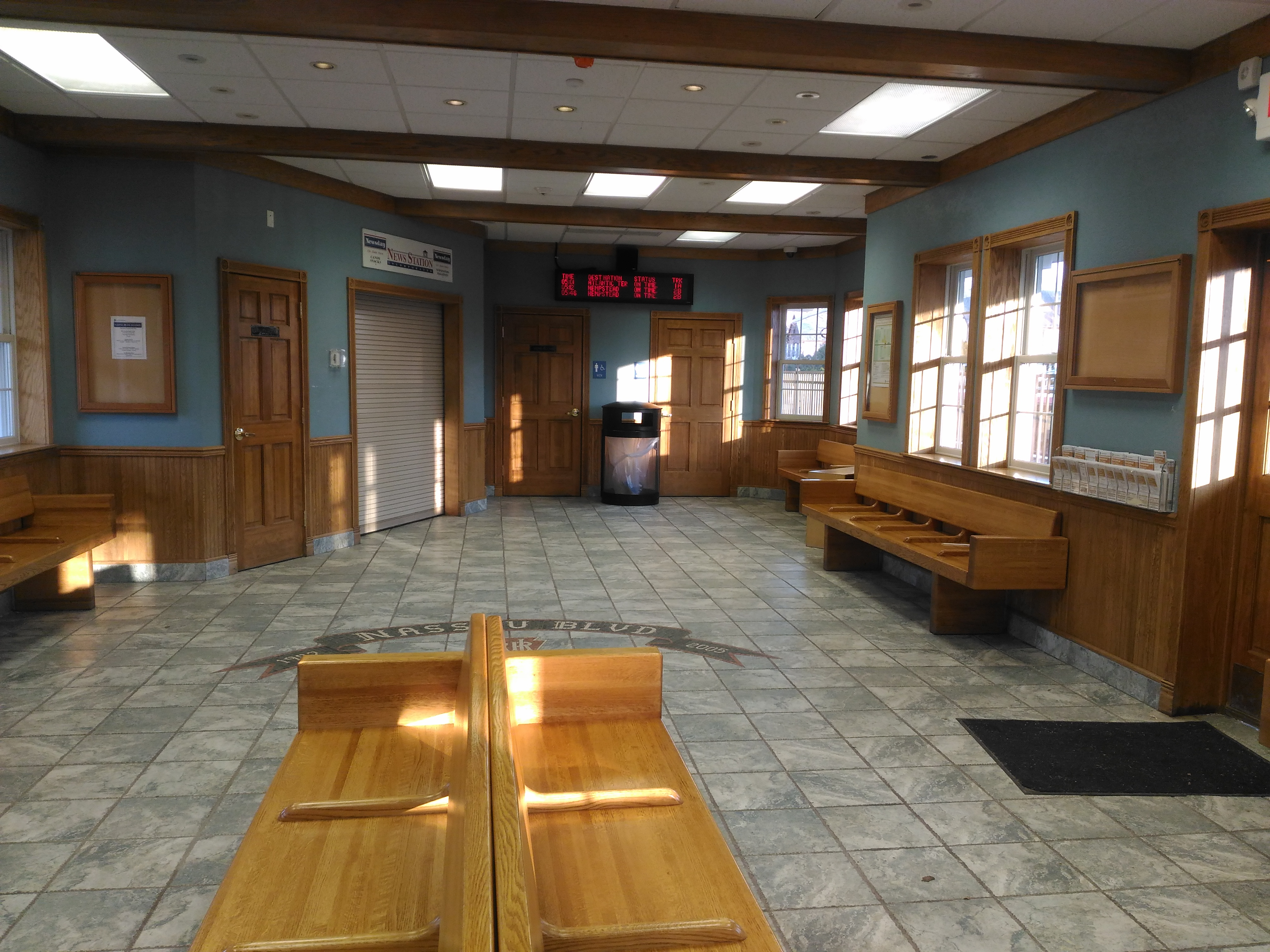
Inside the station house

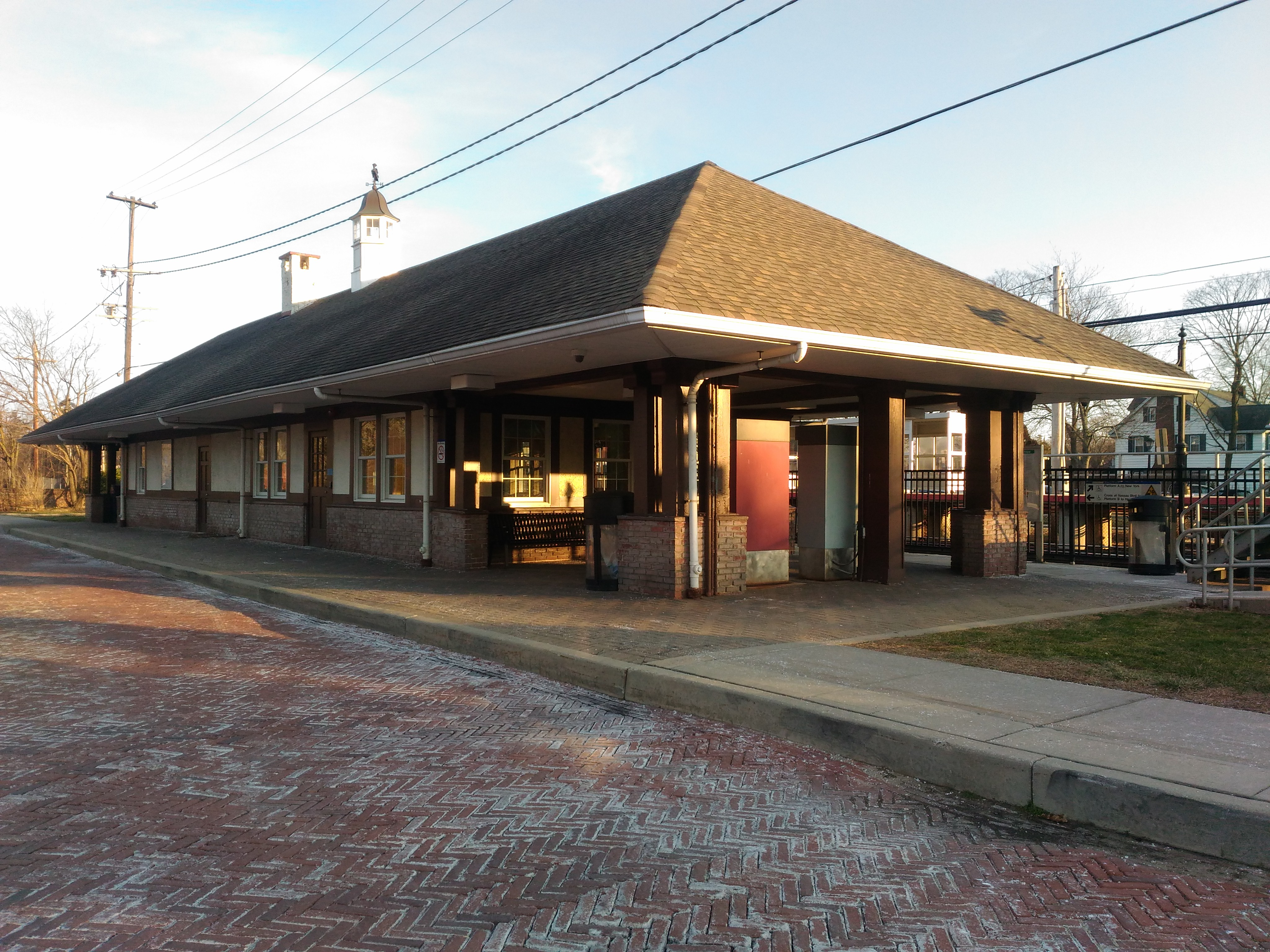
Exterior of the station house

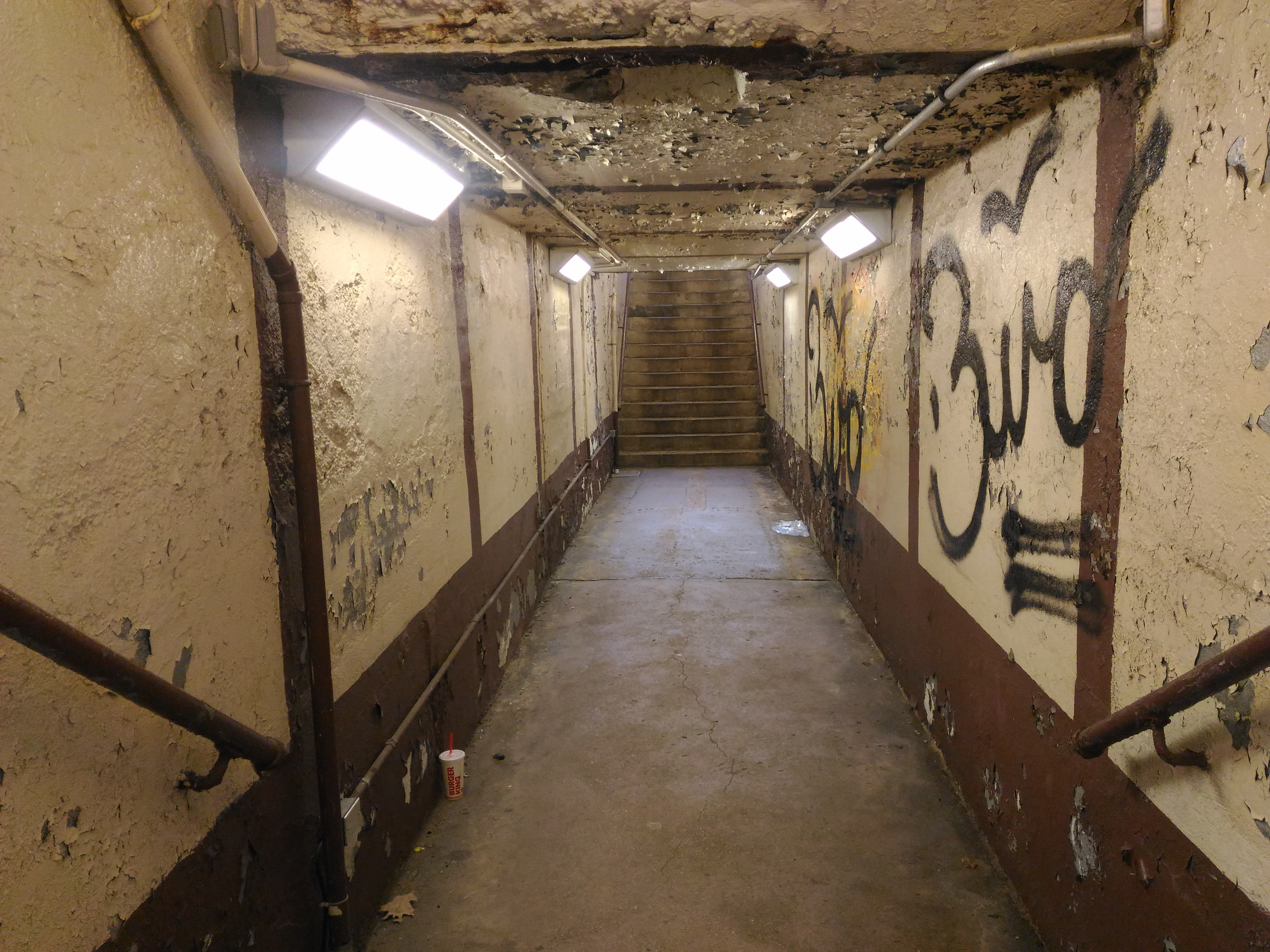
View of the underground passageway

== See also ==
- List of Long Island Rail Road stations
- Merillon Avenue Station
- Country Life Press station
- Garden City station (LIRR)
- Stewart Manor station
