= Merillon Avenue station =

Long Island Rail Road station in Nassau County, New York

Merillon Avenue
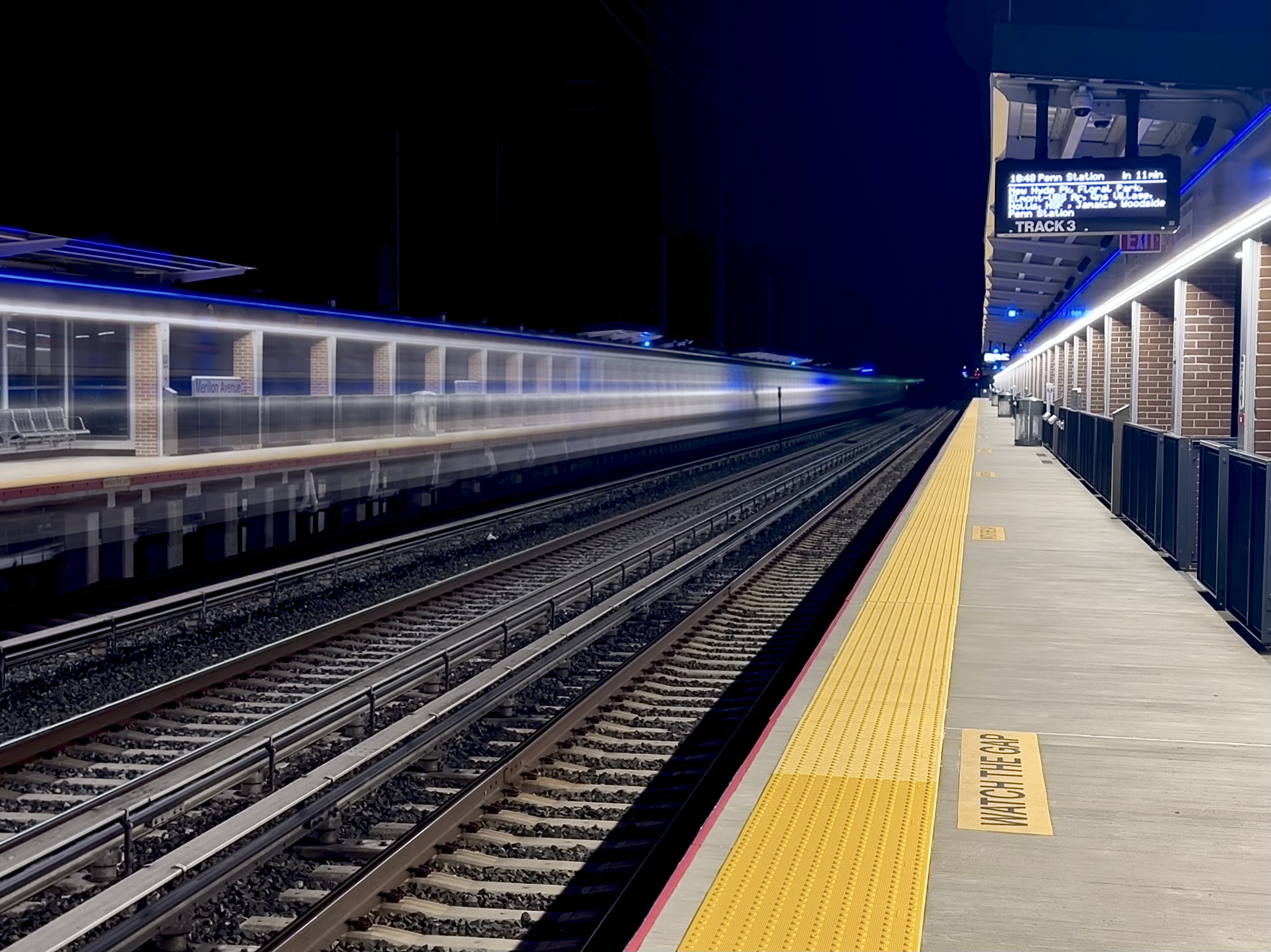
- Merillon Avenue station as seen from the westbound platform.

General information
- Location: Nassau Boulevard and Merillon Avenue; Garden City and Garden City Park, New York
- Coordinates: 40.735164°N 73.662523°W
- Owner: Long Island Rail Road
- Line: Main Line
- Distance: 17.3 mi (27.8 km) from Long Island City
- Platforms: 2 side platforms
- Tracks: 3

Construction
- Parking: Yes
- Cycle facilities: Yes
- Accessible: Yes

Other information
- Station code: MAV
- Fare zone: 4

History
- Opened: 1911
- Rebuilt: 1958, 2021
- Electrified: October 1926; 750 V (DC) third rail
- Former names: Clowesville (1837–1874); Garden City (1874–1876)

Passengers
- 2012—2014: 1,882 per weekday

Services
Preceding station	Long Island Rail Road	Following station
New Hyde Park toward Penn Station, Grand Central or Long Island City	Port Jefferson Branch	Mineola toward Huntington or Port Jefferson
Ronkonkoma Branch does not stop here
Oyster Bay Branch does not stop here
Montauk Branch does not stop here
Former services
Preceding station	Long Island Rail Road	Following station
New Hyde Park toward Long Island City or Penn Station	Main Line	Mineola toward Greenport
Location

Merillon Avenue (/ˈmɛrɪlɒn/) is a station on the Long Island Rail Road's Main Line, served by Port Jefferson Branch trains. It is located at Nassau Boulevard and Merillon Avenue in Garden City Park and Garden City, in Nassau County, New York, United States.

The station is wheelchair accessible with two side platforms and a cross-under at Nassau Boulevard.

== History ==
Merillon Avenue station was established in 1911 near the former Clowesville station, which was established in June 1837 by the Brooklyn and Jamaica Railroad. It was the closest LIRR station to the old Queens County Courthouse (Nassau County became a separate county in 1899, splitting off from Queens County) off Jericho Turnpike. By 1845, it was used only when courts were in session.

From 1874 to 1876, the station was named "Garden City" in order to mislead travelers into thinking that the station served Alexander Turney Stewart's Garden City, which was already served by Garden City station along the Central Railroad of Long Island in 1872. The court moved away in 1877 and the station fell by the wayside, although some trains continued to stop there as late as June 1897. Though re-established as a station in 1911, the station house itself was not built until 1912. The station was rebuilt in 1958, featuring a smaller structure, as well as a narrow, 11'6" bridge under the tracks for Nassau Boulevard; this bridge was replaced with a 14"-high bridge as part of the Main Line Expansion Project in October 2019, but still remains two lanes wide despite the fact that the rest of Nassau Boulevard is a four-lane divided highway.

=== 1993 shooting ===
On December 7, 1993, a mass shooting occurred aboard a Long Island Rail Road (LIRR) train in Garden City Park, New York, United States. As the train arrived at the Merillon Avenue station, passenger Colin Ferguson began firing at passengers with a semi-automatic pistol. Six of the victims were killed and 19 others were wounded before Ferguson was tackled and held down by other passengers on the train.

=== Station enhancements ===
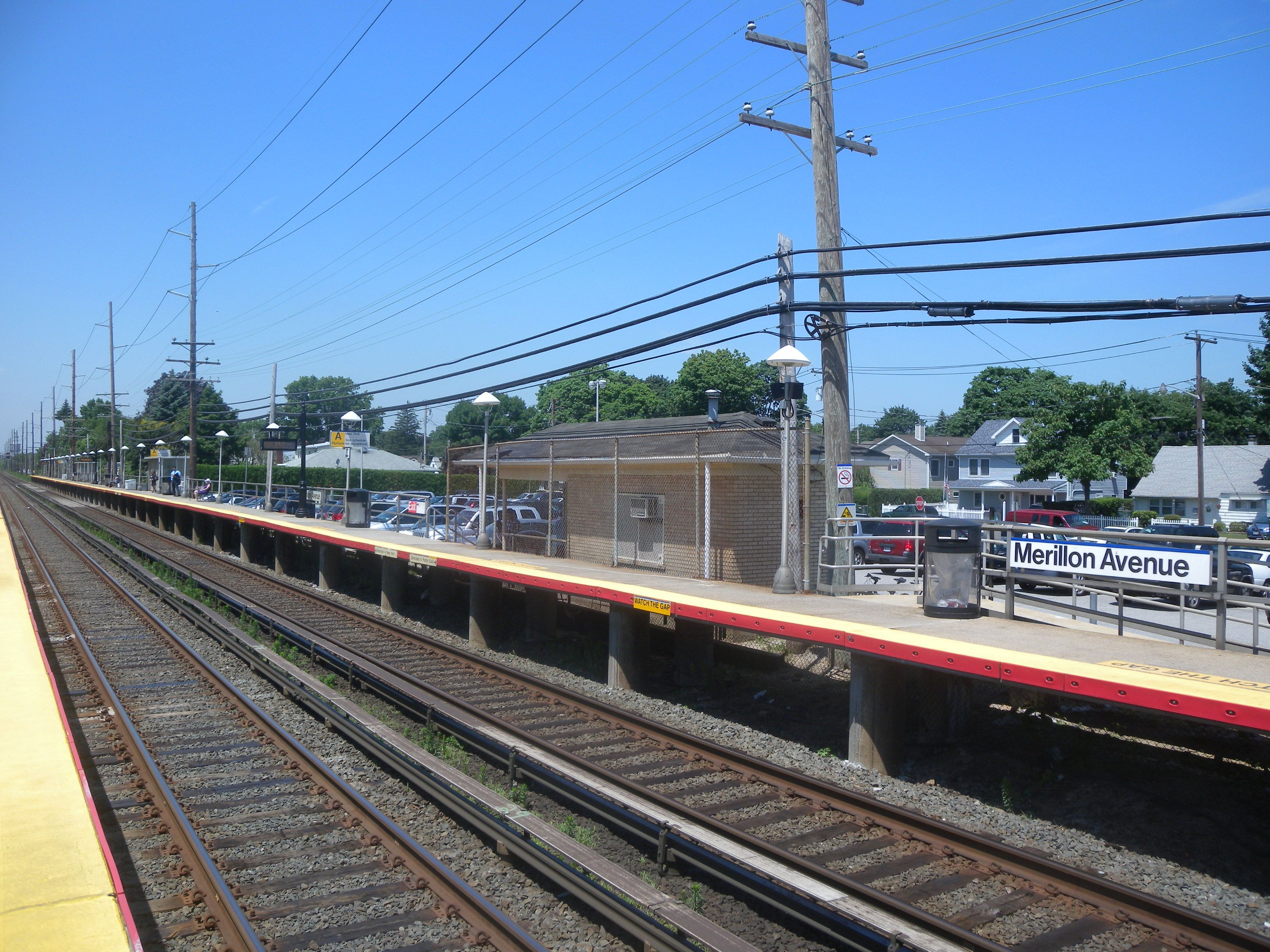
The platforms and former station house prior to reconstruction

As part of the Main Line third track project in the late 2010s and early 2020s, the Merillon Avenue station was extensively rebuilt and upgraded to accommodate full-length 12-car trains. As part of the project, platform B was relocated to allow for the construction of a third track. Canopies, benches, signage, and security cameras were installed. The station was made fully compliant with the Americans with Disabilities Act of 1990, through the installation of elevators and ramps. The existing station building was demolished, and the land it formerly occupied was repurposed to allow for extra commuter parking spaces. Amenities such as Wi-Fi, USB charging stations, artwork, and digital information displays were also included in the renovation.

In addition to the station renovations, the LIRR's electrical substation at the Merillon Avenue station was replaced to make way for the third track, and the train bridge over Nassau Boulevard was replaced with a new, three-track bridge with a clearance below of 14 feet (4.3 m).

== Station layout ==
This station has two high-level side platforms, each the length of 12 train cars.

== See also ==
- History of the Long Island Rail Road
- List of Long Island Rail Road stations
- Nassau Boulevard station
- Country Life Press station
- Garden City station (LIRR)
- Stewart Manor station
