= Garden City station (LIRR) =

Long Island Rail Road station in Nassau County, New York

Garden City
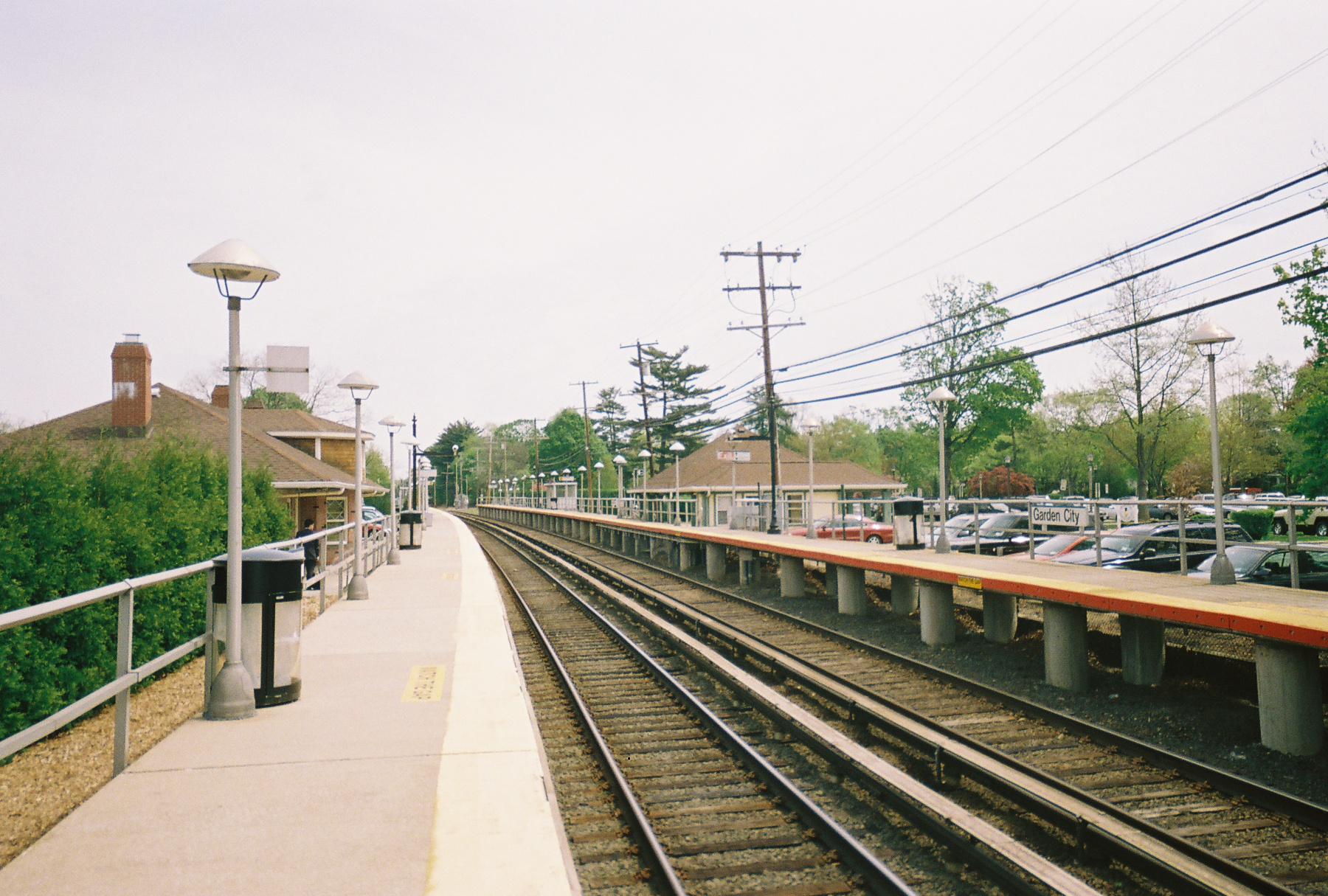
- The two station houses of Garden City's Long Island Rail Road Station, looking east.

General information
- Location: Seventh Street; Garden City, New York
- Coordinates: 40.723136°N 73.64007°W
- Owner: Long Island Rail Road
- Line: Hempstead Branch
- Distance: 18.4 mi (29.6 km) from Long Island City
- Platforms: 2 side platforms
- Tracks: 2
- Connections: Nassau Inter-County Express: n40, n41

Construction
- Parking: Yes
- Cycle facilities: Yes; bike rack
- Accessible: Yes

Other information
- Station code: GCY
- Fare zone: 4

History
- Opened: 1872 (CRRLI)
- Rebuilt: 1898
- Electrified: May 26, 1908; 750 V (DC) third rail

Passengers
- 2012—2014: 1,133 per weekday

Services
Preceding station	Long Island Rail Road	Following station
Nassau Boulevard toward Penn Station, Grand Central or Atlantic Terminal	Hempstead Branch	Country Life Press toward Hempstead
Location

Garden City is one of five stations on the Long Island Rail Road located within the village of Garden City, New York. It is on the Hempstead Branch and is at Seventh Street between Hilton and Cathedral Avenues, directly across the street from the Garden City Hotel. It is one of the few Long Island Rail Road stations with two station houses.

== History ==
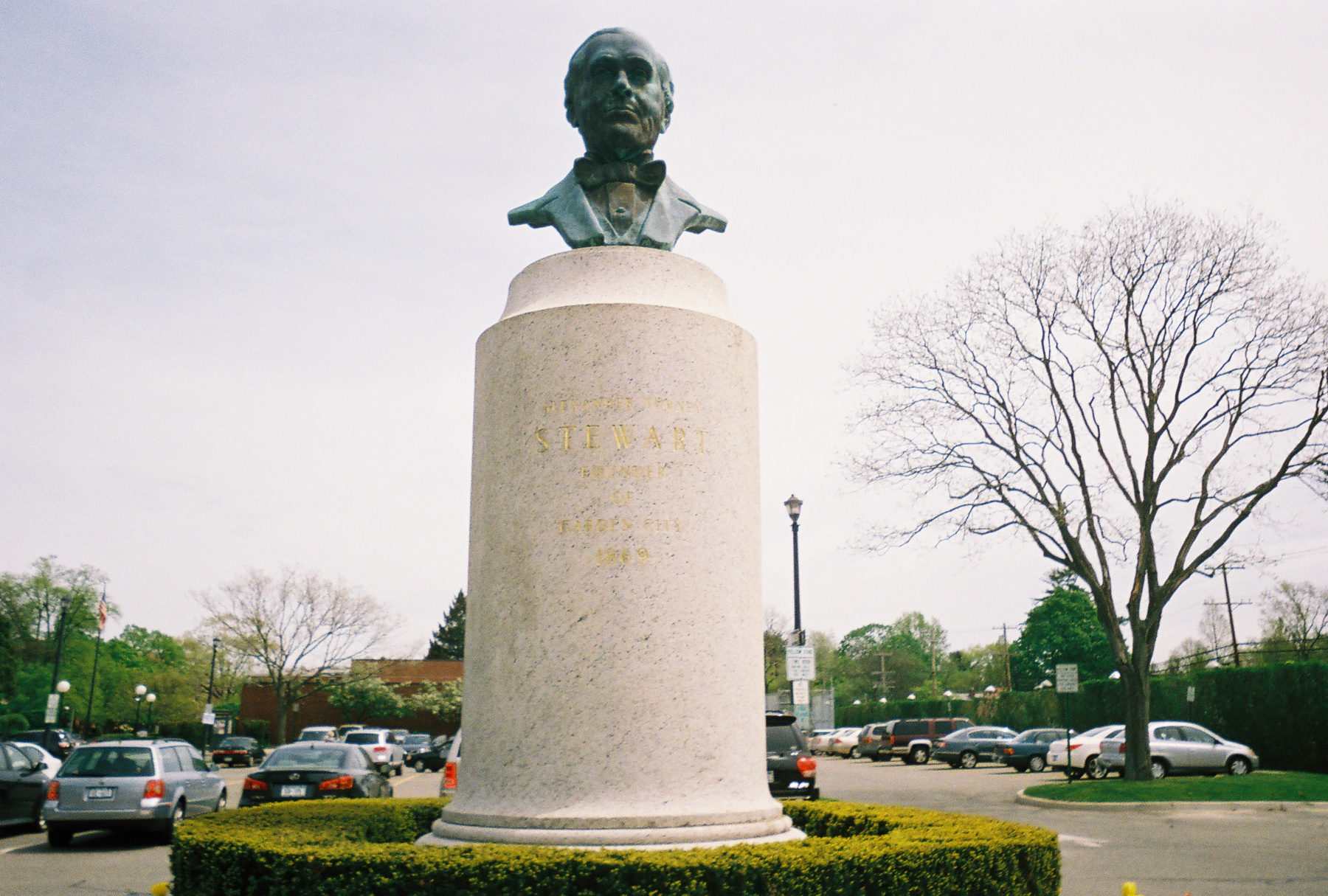
A bust of Alexander Turney Stewart in the parking lot

Garden City station was originally built in 1872 by the Central Railroad of Long Island, which was built by Alexander Turney Stewart to bring visitors to the Garden City Hotel. The original station was a typical one-story Victorian structure with a second story over the front door, and a back "porch" over high platforms. It also included a separate freight house.

The CRRLI merged with the Flushing and North Side Railroad in 1874 to form the Flushing, North Shore and Central Railroad, only to be acquired by the Long Island Rail Road in 1876. Prior to their acquisition of the FNS&C, the LIRR gave the name "Garden City Station" to Clowesville station along the main line. The LIRR rebuilt it in 1898, and the rebuilt station had eyebrow porch windows along the roof and trolley connections to Mineola-Freeport branch of the New York and Long Island Traction Company. A pedestrian tunnel was added in 1915, which included an additional trolley along the Central Branch, and a removal of the eyebrow porch windows on the roof of the station house before 1918. High-level platforms were added during the 1970s and a major restoration project took place in the early-21st Century.

Besides standing in the shadow of the Garden City Hotel, Garden City station is also next to the Garden City Public Library. The station has residential parking on both sides of the tracks on 6th and 7th Streets, as well as unrestricted free parking at nearby Stewart Avenue between Hilton & Franklin Avenues, and free parking during off-peak hours along 6th Street near Cathedral Avenue.

The station provides access to the Cathedral of the Incarnation. Built in 1876, it is listed on the U.S. National Register of Historic Places and stands just south of the station on Cathedral Avenue.

== Station layout ==
The station has two high-level side platforms, each 10 cars long.

== See also ==
- List of Long Island Rail Road stations
- Country Life Press station
- Nassau Boulevard station
- Stewart Manor station
