= Grumman station =

Train station in New York, US (1942–85)

Grumman

General information
- Location: South Oyster Bay Road; Bethpage, New York; Hicksville, New York
- Coordinates: 40.754306°N 73.500694°W
- Owner: Long Island Rail Road
- Line: Main Line
- Platforms: 2 side platform
- Tracks: 2

Other information
- Station code: None

History
- Opened: February 2, 1942
- Closed: December 2, 1985

Former services
Preceding station	Long Island Rail Road	Following station
Hicksville toward Penn Station or Grand Central	Ronkonkoma Branch	Bethpage toward Ronkonkoma
Preceding station	Long Island Rail Road	Following station
Hicksville toward Long Island City or Penn Station	Main Line	Bethpage toward Greenport
Location

Grumman was a station along the Main Line of the Long Island Rail Road (LIRR) at South Oyster Bay Road that served employees of Grumman Engineering Aircraft Corporation, at the Grumman Bethpage Airport.

== History ==
With the outbreak of World War II, Grumman received federal contracts to build war planes. On January 22, 1942 it was announced that a station would be built to serve the local plant. The station opened on February 2 with two trains in the morning heading east and two trains in the evening heading west; service was expanded further in the fall. The station was built with a wooden shelter. Grumman needed to extend its airfield runway in 1950, requiring that South Oyster Bay Road, the grade crossing, and the station be moved. The LIRR protested the change, fearing that the extended runway increased the likelihood for a crash between a train and a plane. The LIRR lost its case in December 1950. The new road, station and crossing opened on February 19, 1951. The new eastbound platform was located east of the new road crossing, and the new westbound platform was west of the new crossing. Metal shelter sheds were built during the 1960s.

Ridership declined as the Grumman facility was downsized, and as a result service was reduced to one morning train in each direction, and one afternoon westbound flag stop by 1958. On March 28, 1985, at a meeting with village officials in Farmingdale, the LIRR announced that the electrification of the Main Line to Ronkonkoma required the closing of either the Farmingdale, Bethpage or Grumman stations. Since Grumman had fewer than ten daily passengers, all of whom were employees of Grumman, the station closed on December 2, 1985, with the last train scheduled on November 29. The former airport location now features the Nassau County Police Heliport. Nothing remains of the former station today.
