= Rainbow Monument Park =

Park in Garden City, New York, United States

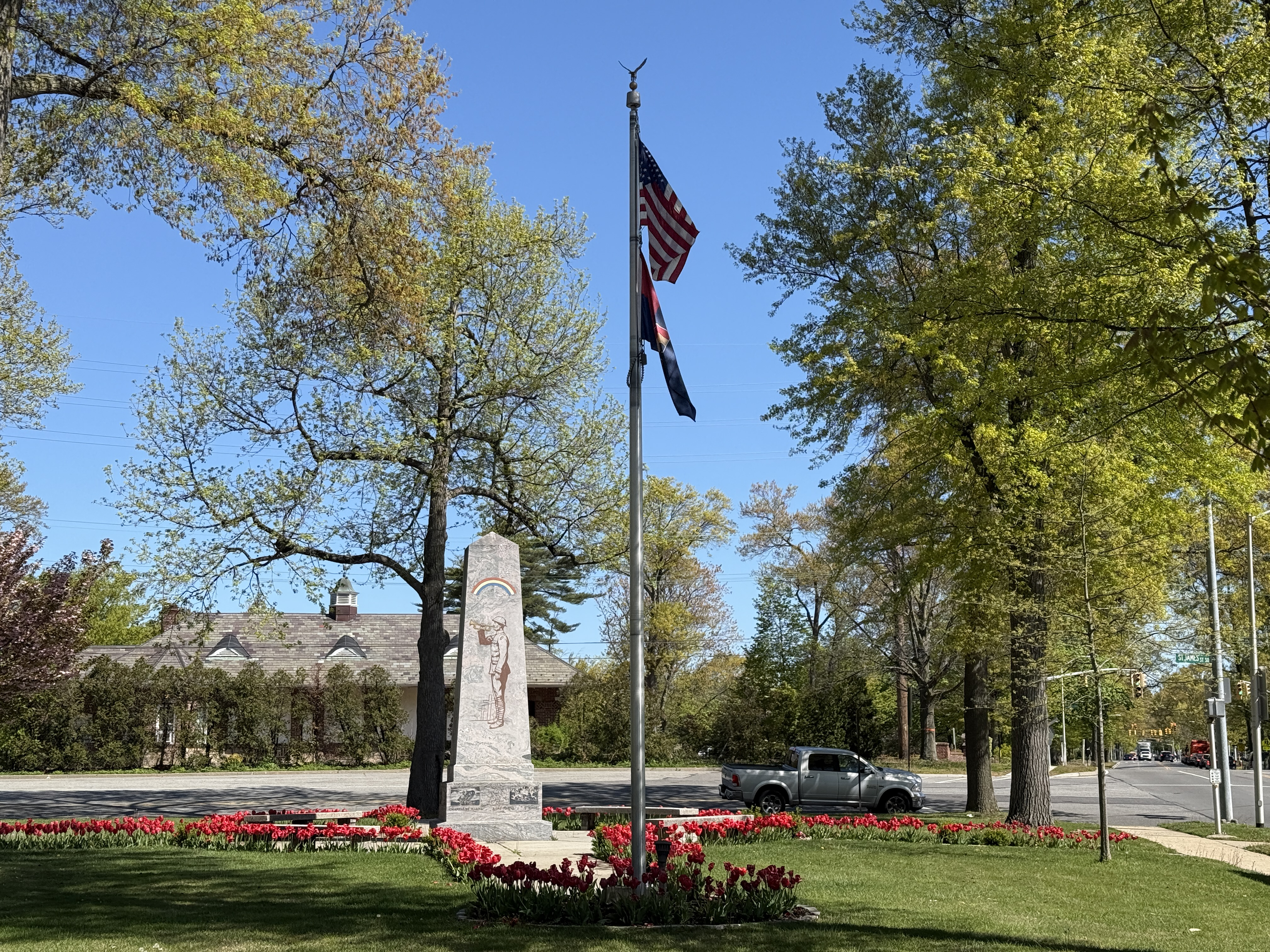
- The park and monument in 2026
- Interactive map of Rainbow Monument Park
- Type: Public; Memorial
- Location: Garden City, New York, United States
- Coordinates: 40°43′37″N 73°37′15″W
- Established: 1941
- Owner: Incorporated Village of Garden City

Rainbow Monument Park is a triangular park located within the Incorporated Village of Garden City, in Nassau County, New York, United States. It was established in 1941.

== Description ==
Rainbow Monument Park occupies the triangle between Clinton Road, Rainbow Place, and Saint James Street, within the Incorporated Village of Garden City. It consists of an obelisk memorial, benches, a flag, paths, and a garden.

== History ==
Rainbow Monument Park was established in 1941. It is located near the former site of Camp Mills – a major military facility during World War I that was located in what would become the Incorporated Village of Garden City. The park is next to the former Clinton Road railroad station.

== Rainbow Division Monument ==
The Rainbow Division Monument is a large, obelisk-type military memorial monument in Rainbow Monument Park, within Garden City, New York, United States.

The monument was erected in 1941, to honor the 42nd Infantry Division's service during World War I – along with the American soldiers who were killed in the war. The 42nd Infantry Division – also known as the "Rainbow Division" – was assembled at nearby Camp Mills during WWI. The official dedication occurred on Columbus Day, 1941.

In 2017, the monument was restored, in time for the 100th anniversary of World War I.

== See also ==
- Islandia Veterans Memorial Triangle
- Macri Triangle
