= Garden City–Mitchel Field Secondary =

Long Island Rail Road branch

Garden City–Mitchell Field Secondary
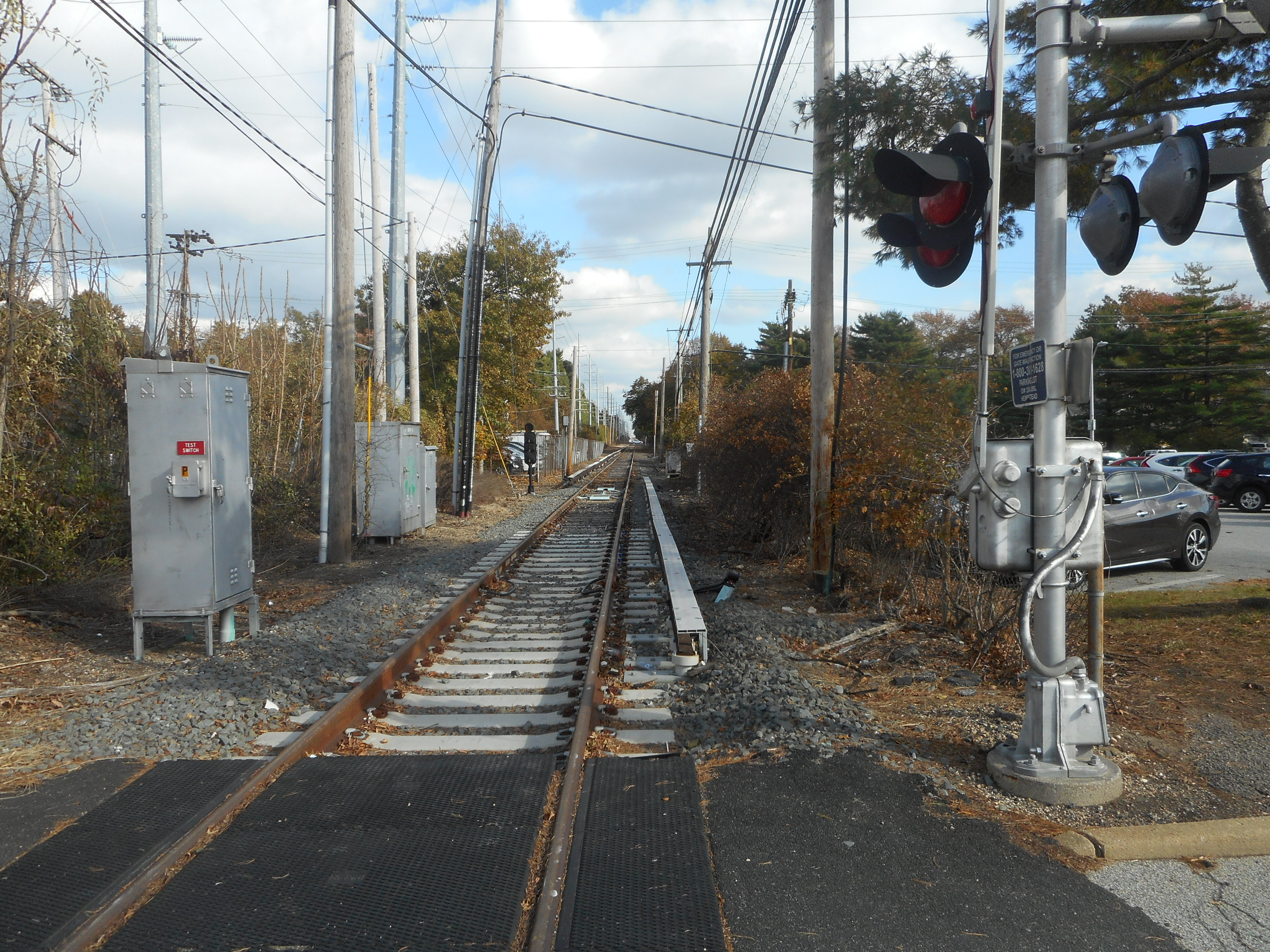
- The Garden City–Mitchel Field Secondary in Garden City, looking east

Overview
- Status: Freight
- Owner: Long Island Rail Road
- Termini: Clinton Road; Central Park
- Stations: 11 (all former)

Service
- System: Long Island Rail Road
- Operator: New York and Atlantic Railway

History
- Opened: 1870s (as part of the Central Railroad of Long Island)

Technical
- Num of tracks: 1–2
- Track gauge: 4 ft 8 1/2 in (1,435 mm) standard gauge

The Garden City–Mitchell Field Secondary is a lightly used freight branch of the Long Island Rail Road. It is a spur off the Hempstead Branch.

== History ==
The trackage of the Garden City–Mitchell Field Secondary, originated in the 1870s as part of the Central Railroad of Long Island (CRRLI). Built by Alexander Turney Stewart, the CRRLI was a mixed use passenger and freight railroad extending from Flushing all the way through central Long Island to Bethpage, passing through the towns of Floral Park, Garden City, Plainedge, and Island Trees. Later on, Stewart extended the line south to the Babylon shore line. This portion of the railroad would come to be referred to as the Babylon Extension. At Flushing the railroad had trackage rights with the Flushing and North Side Railroad to access their Long Island City terminal where passengers could then connect to the East River ferries that would take them into Manhattan.

Additionally, Stewart built a branch line, which deviated from the railroad's mainline at Garden City, to Hempstead. Stewart at the time was developing Garden City as one of the first planned suburban communities. The CRRLI would play an important role in transporting materials from Stewart's brickwork's in Bethpage to his construction sites in Garden City, and later on allow Garden City residents to commute into Manhattan.

=== Merger with the LIRR ===
In 1876 the CRRLI, in conjuncture with other competing railroads on Long Island, was absorbed by the Long Island Rail Road and its president Conrad Poppenhausen. Poppenhausen, and his later successor Austin Corbin, would merge the Central into the LIRR system. The Central between Flushing and the National Rifle Range in Queens, later to become the Creedmoor Rifle Range and later Creedmoor State Hospital, was deemed redundant and abandoned after the railroads' merger in 1879, although its tracks remained in place until about World War I. The portion of rail between Creedmoor and Floral Park was eventually downgraded to a secondary freight track, known as the Creedmoor Branch, that for most of the 20th century would service Creedmoor State Hospital with daily coal deliveries. The portion of trackage from Floral Park to Babylon became known as the Central Branch of the LIRR. A connection was made west of Floral Park, allowing the railroad to access the LIRR mainline, which would afford the branch its connection to Long Island City and the LIRR's connecting hub Jamaica station.

=== Gradual passenger service abandonment (1900–1953) ===
In 1900, the eastern portion of the Central Branch between Bethpage and Babylon (the Babylon Extension) was completely rebuilt and extended northward so that it could connect to the Main Line of the LIRR, thus creating a connection between the Main Line and the railroad's other main trunk line the Montauk Branch. Meanwhile, the western portion of the Central between Floral Park and Hempstead saw much passenger use and would eventually become known as the Hempstead Branch. The rest of the Central between Garden City and Bethpage saw much use during the early part of the 20th century, but with the advent of the automobile in the 1910s, followed by the Great Depression, the 1930s saw this portion of the line dwindle in service. In the late 1920s the Central's connection at Bethpage to the Babylon Extension was severed, ending all through service on the branch to Babylon. Therefore, the LIRR renamed the line the Central Extension. The Babylon Extension, and its connection to the Main Line, would be renamed the Central Branch, a name which remains in use today.

The only bright spot for the line came when Mitchel Field, an air force base, opened during World War I in the expansive area of the Hempstead Plains. The Central Extension saw much freight business servicing the base and the several industries that sprang up around it. Nonetheless, in 1939 it was decided to discontinue all passenger service on the Central Extension. Much of the trackage between Mitchel Field and Bethpage was torn up and used as scrap metal in World War II. A reprieve came in the late 1940s when William Levitt began building Levittown in the Plainedge area of Nassau County. Some of the trackage was relaid so as to provide the materials needed in the Levitt construction, and for a while, a small passenger shuttle was instituted by the LIRR between Garden City and Plainedge. The LIRR offered to rebuild completely the trackage so as to provide those living in the new community with rail service. However, Levitt did not want a railroad running through his new community. Gradually the shuttle was cut back and rail pulled up to just east of Mitchel Field, which itself gradually began to curtail its operations in the early fifties as the surrounding areas began their suburban development. The shuttle ceased operation in 1953.

=== As a freight secondary (1953–present) ===
After the end of passenger shuttle service and the closing of Mitchel Field in 1961, the LIRR continued to use the line in its freight service, officially giving the line its current name the Garden City–Mitchel Field Secondary. A large freight yard remained in Garden City, servicing some local industries such as A&P, General Bronze, and Newsday. A few passenger trains continued to use the line into the late 1960s to service the old Roosevelt Raceway. Many plans were developed by the LIRR during the fifties and sixties to use the remaining portion of trackage and build a "Nassau Hub" that would service the many new retail outfits that sprung up in the area, such as the Roosevelt Field Mall, as well as the newly built Nassau Coliseum, and Nassau Community College, which was built on part of the Mitchel Field site. However, lack of resources (at the time the bankrupt LIRR was in the process of being bought by the MTA from the Pennsylvania Railroad), as well as community opposition from residents in Garden City shelved those plans.

In the 1980s through late 1991, the LIRR had several customers on the line, or in the team yard, who were switched once or more a week: White Rose, at the end of the spur that ran northeast out of the yard, at Zeckendorf Boulevard, a plastics customer at the end of the line at Endo Boulevard, at one of the entrances to Nassau Community College, the waste ash from the Town of Hempstead's incinerator next to the Meadowbrook State Parkway, and off-line customers who received boxcars, flatcars, and gondolas of various types of goods in the team yard by Stewart Avenue.

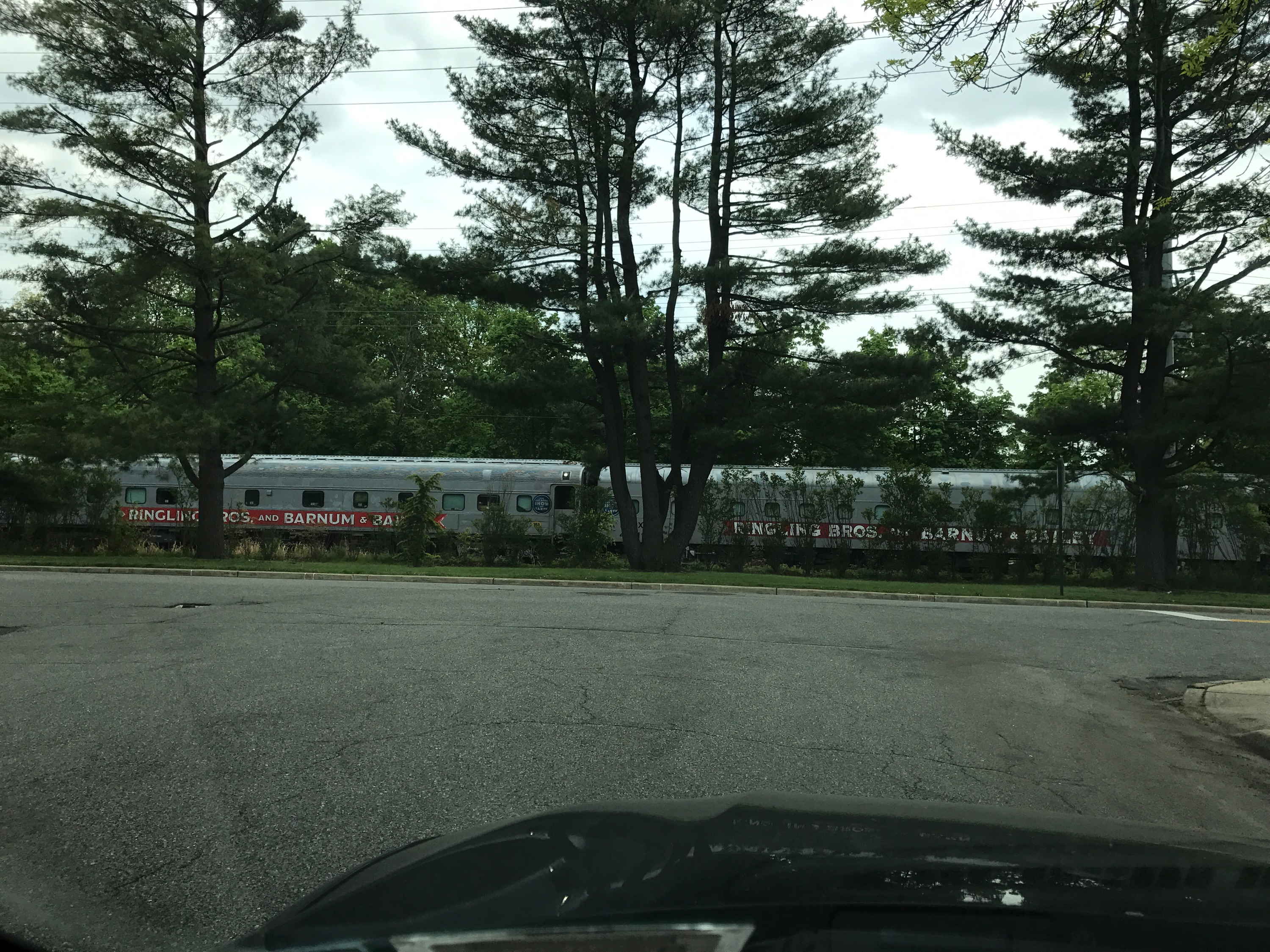
The Ringling Bros. and Barnum & Bailey Circus on the Garden-City Mitchel Field Secondary in 2017

As the years went on the remaining freight customers along the line also disappeared as the LIRR focused its resources on passenger service and constructing the East Side Access project, linking from Long Island to New York City's Grand Central Terminal via Grand Central Madison.

The Long Island Rail Road formally transferred freight operations to the New York and Atlantic Railway in May 1997. Currently, the NY&A has no freight customers on the line.

Today, the LIRR uses the secondary to transport track work equipment to and from the Garden City yard. The secondary was also used by the Ringling Bros. Barnum & Bailey Circus train, which used to use the Garden City Yard to store boxcars when it visited the Nassau Veterans Memorial Coliseum, which is near the east end of the secondary. Ringling Bros. Barnum & Bailey closed on Sunday, May 21, 2017.

The line currently alternates between being single and double tracked, with some electrification extending as far as the Garden City yard. A number of freight sidings and team tracks remain along the line. Most of the line's grade crossings remain unprotected and require flag protection against traffic by train crews. The Clinton Road passenger station, from the line's early days, still stands along with its low level concrete platforms. The station house is currently used by the Garden City Fire Department.

== Station list ==
Station/location	Current Connections/notes	History
Hempstead Crossing had connections from Hempstead Branch, West Hempstead Branch, and Oyster Bay Branch
Clinton Road		opened 1915, closed May 15, 1953
Newsday	Built for the original headquarters of Newsday.	opened June 1949, closed May 15, 1953
A&P, General Bronze		Built around 1928 for the A&P Warehouse. Combined with General Bronze Corporation station in 1949. Closed May 15, 1953.
General Bronze		
Mitchel Field	Wooden shelter for Mitchel Air Force Base	closed May 15, 1953.
Meadowbrook-Roosevelt Raceway	Built to serve Roosevelt Raceway in Westbury.	opened 1939, closed 1961.
Meadowbrook		opened 1873, closed 1939.
Newbridge Road		
Central Avenue		
Salisbury Plains		
Island Trees		
Central Park		
Connections to Main Line and Bethpage Branch
