= Bethpage station =

Long Island Rail Road station in Nassau County, New York

Bethpage
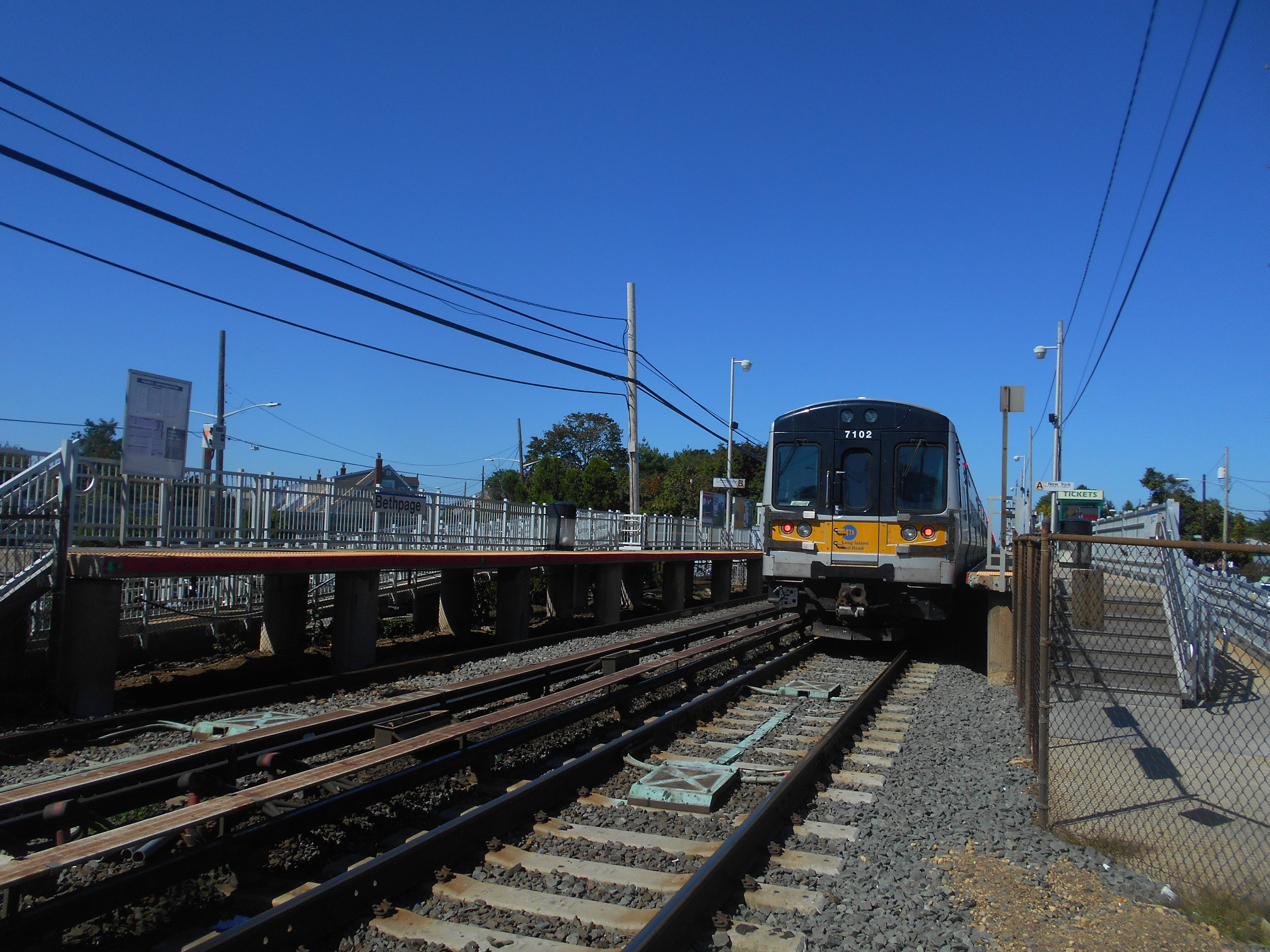
- A westbound train at the Bethpage station in 2014

General information
- Coordinates: 40.742994°N 73.483359°W
- Owner: Long Island Rail Road
- Lines: Main Line; Central Branch
- Distance: 27.9 mi (44.9 km) from Long Island City
- Platforms: 2 side platforms
- Tracks: 2

Construction
- Parking: Yes; Free and Town of Oyster Bay permits
- Cycle facilities: Yes
- Accessible: yes

Other information
- Station code: BPG
- Fare zone: 7

History
- Opened: 1856
- Rebuilt: 1959
- Electrified: 1987; 750 V (DC) third rail
- Former names: Jerusalem Station (1854–1936); Jerusalem (1863–1936); Central Park (1867–1936)

Passengers
- 2012—2014: 3,631 per weekday

Services
Preceding station	Long Island Rail Road	Following station
Hicksville toward Penn Station or Grand Central	Ronkonkoma Branch	Farmingdale toward Ronkonkoma
Montauk Branch does not stop here
Former services
Preceding station	Long Island Rail Road	Following station
Grumman toward Long Island City or Penn Station	Main Line	Farmingdale toward Greenport
Island Trees toward Country Life Press	Garden City–Mitchel Field Secondary	Terminus
Terminus	Central Branch	South Farmingdale toward Babylon
Location

Bethpage station is a commuter rail station along the Main Line of the Long Island Rail Road. It is located at Stewart Avenue and Jackson Avenue, in Bethpage, New York, and serves Ronkonkoma Branch trains. Trains that travel along the Central Branch also use these tracks, but do not stop here.

== History ==
Long Island Rail Road (LIRR) tracks were completed on the present line in 1841. At first, trains did not stop here, with Bethpage appearing only as a notation ("late Bethpage") associated with the Farmingdale station to the east. By 1854, the LIRR stopped at a local station called Jerusalem. A local post office opened January 29, 1857, with the name Jerusalem Station. In 1867, the residents voted to change the name of the local post office to Central Park, and both that and Jerusalem appeared on LIRR schedules until 1936. The station and the post office were renamed Bethpage on October 1, 1936. In 1959, the station burned down and was replaced. Electrified service through the station was inaugurated in 1987.

Two nearby stations also had Bethpage in their name:

- Bethpage Junction was a connection to the east of the present station where the LIRR crossed with the Central Railroad of Long Island, which was built in 1873. A platform was built to enable passengers to transfer. This is the location where the present Central Branch splits from the Main Line at Beth Interlocking one mile southeast of the Bethpage station on the way to Babylon station and the Montauk Branch. The LIRR built the B-Tower at Beth Interlocking in 1925 to replace hand-operated switching between the tracks.
- Bethpage was also the name of the northern terminus of the former Bethpage Branch from Bethpage Junction to the former Bethpage Brickworks in the community now called Old Bethpage, but which was called Bethpage until 1936.

From 1873 until 1876, the Central Railroad of Long Island had a regularly scheduled stop also named Central Park near Stewart Avenue and Motor Lane in Plainedge, approximately 0.75 miles (1.21 km) south of the present station. Service was continued by the LIRR at that location until about 1924.

== Station layout ==
There are two tracks at this station with two 12-car high-level side platforms.
