= Country Life Press station =

Long Island Rail Road station

Country Life Press
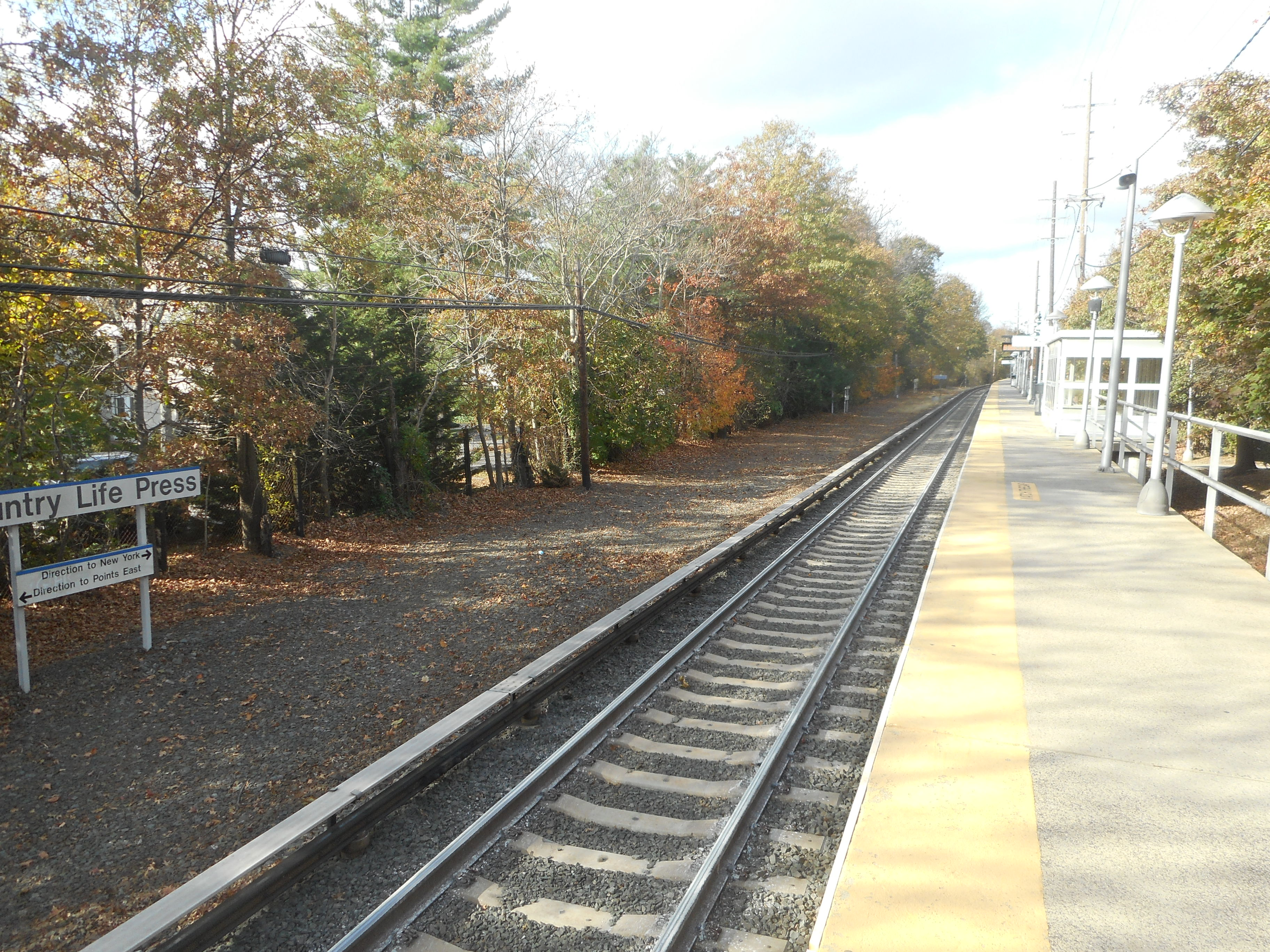
- The Country Life Press station in 2017

General information
- Location: St. James Street South, between Chestnut Street & Damson Street; Garden City, New York
- Coordinates: 40.721234°N 73.629405°W
- Owner: Long Island Rail Road
- Line: Hempstead Branch
- Distance: 19.0 mi (30.6 km) from Long Island City
- Platforms: 1 side platform
- Tracks: 1

Construction
- Parking: Yes
- Accessible: yes

Other information
- Station code: CLP
- Fare zone: 4

History
- Opened: 1911
- Electrified: May 26, 1908; 750 V (DC) third rail

Passengers
- 2012—2014: 717 per weekday

Services
| Preceding station | Long Island Rail Road | Following station |
|---|---|---|
| Garden City toward Penn Station, Grand Central or Atlantic Terminal | Hempstead Branch | Hempstead Terminus |
Former services
| Preceding station | Long Island Rail Road | Following station |
|---|---|---|
| West Hempstead toward Valley Stream | West Hempstead Branch | Stewart Avenue toward Mineola |
| Terminus | Garden City–Mitchel Field Secondary | Clinton Road toward Bethpage |
Location

The Country Life Press station is a station on the Long Island Rail Road within the village of Garden City, New York. It serves trains on the Hempstead Branch and is located on Damson Street and St. James Street South.

== History ==
The station was originally opened in 1911 for the sole purpose of serving the book publisher Doubleday, Page & Company, which had moved in 1910 from Manhattan to Garden City, where co-founder and vice-president Walter Hines Page lived. It is named for the publisher's "Country Life Press" that was located across the tracks.

Country Life Press station has some former rights-of-way that led to the West Hempstead and the Oyster Bay Branches. It also included the remnants of the Central Branch of the Long Island Rail Road that terminated near Nassau Coliseum.

In 2022, the Long Island Rail Road announced plans to demolish the station house, which had fallen into a state of disrepair, and replacing it with a landscaped plaza. That December, the Village of Garden City's officials, through a 7-1 vote, opted through resolution not to attempt saving the structure, given safety concerns – many of which were raised by members of the community – and the poor state of the structure.

== Station layout ==
The station has one 10-car-long side platform located on the east side of the single track. A pedestrian underpass provides access between the west and east sides of the track, and connects the west side with the station platform.
