= Garden City, New York =

- Village
- Incorporated Village of Garden City
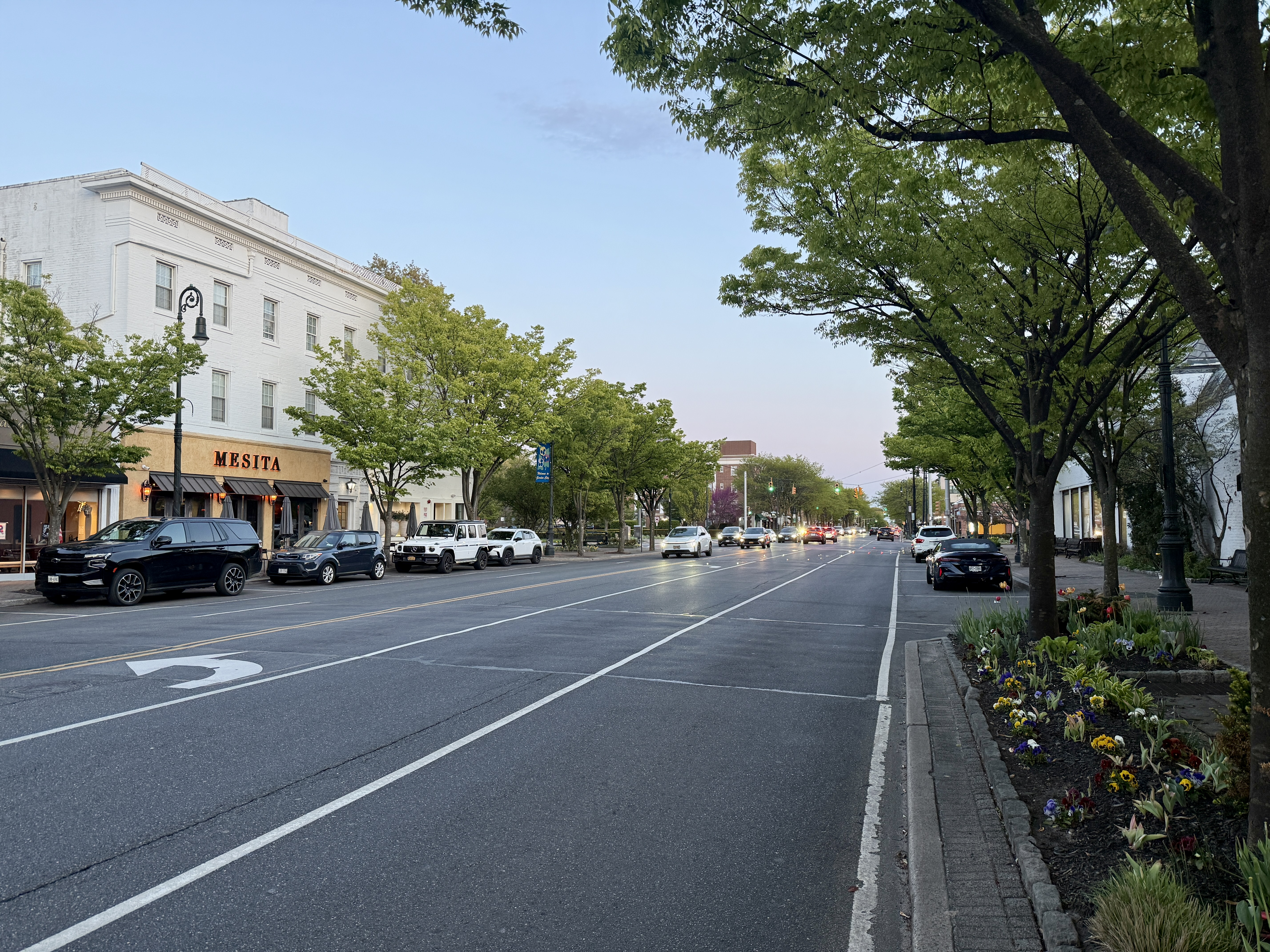
- Downtown Garden City in 2026

- Flag Seal
- Nickname: "Stewart's Folly"
- Location in Nassau County and the state of New York

- Location on Long Island Location within the state of New York
- Coordinates: 40°43′37″N 73°38′59″W
- Country: United States
- State: New York
- County: Nassau
- Towns: Hempstead; North Hempstead
- First settled: 1869
- Incorporated: 1919
- Founder: Alexander Turney Stewart

Government
  - Mayor: Edward T. Finneran
  - Deputy Mayor: Judy Courtney
  - Trustees: List of Trustees: • Rich Catalano; • Judy Courtney; • Michele Beach Harrington; • Vincent Muldoon; • Gerard Smith; • Jessica Tai; • Yvonne Varano

Area
  - Total: 5.36 sq mi (13.87 km^{2})
  - Land: 5.33 sq mi (13.80 km^{2})
  - Water: 0.027 sq mi (0.07 km^{2})
- Elevation: 89 ft (27 m)

Population (2020)
  - Total: 23,272
  - Density: 4,367.7/sq mi (1,686.39/km^{2})
- Time zone: UTC-5 (Eastern (EST))
  - Summer (DST): UTC-4 (EDT)
- ZIP Codes: 11530 (Garden City); 11501 (Mineola)
- Area codes: 516, 363
- FIPS code: 36-28178
- GNIS feature ID: 0950875
- Website: www.gardencityny.net

Garden City is a village in Nassau County, on Long Island, in New York, United States. It is the Greater Garden City area's anchor community. The population was 23,272 at the time of the 2020 census. The Incorporated Village of Garden City is primarily within the town of Hempstead, except for a small area at the northern tip of the village that is within North Hempstead.

== History ==
=== 19th century ===
In 1869, Irish-born millionaire Alexander Turney Stewart bought a portion of the lightly populated Hempstead Plains. In a letter, Stewart described his intentions for Garden City:

Having been informed that interested parties are circulating statements to the effect that my purpose in desiring to purchase the Hempstead Plains is to devote them to the erection of tenement houses, and public charities of a like character, etc. I consider it proper to state that my only object in seeking to acquire these lands is to devote them to the usual purposes for which such lands, so located, should be applied that is, open them by constructing extensive public roads, laying out the lands in parcels for sale to actual settlers, and erecting at various points attractive buildings and residences, so that a barren waste may speedily be covered by a population desirable in every respect as neighbour taxpayers and as citizens. In doing this I am prepared and would be willing to expend several millions of dollars.

The new community's central attraction was the Garden City Hotel. It was replaced by a new hotel in 1895, designed by the acclaimed firm of McKim, Mead & White. This hotel was destroyed by fire in 1899 and then rebuilt and expanded, before being replaced again in 1983. The hotel still stands on the original grounds, as do many nearby Victorian homes. Access to Garden City was provided by the Central Railroad of Long Island, another Stewart project that he undertook at the same time. This railroad, in conjunction with the Flushing & North Side Railroad, ran from Long Island City through Garden City to Farmingdale (with a spur to the location of the Stewart's brickworks in Bethpage), and then to Babylon. It opened in 1873, with a branch to Hempstead.

Stewart's wife, Cornelia, founded the Cathedral Schools of St. Paul (for boys) and St. Mary (for girls), (Note: The principal of the school was Charlotte Titcomb, a member of the class of 1852 at Dedham High School) a Bishop's Residence and the Gothic Cathedral of the Incarnation, which is today the center of the Episcopal Diocese of Long Island, as well as the final resting place of Alexander Turney Stewart and Cornelia Stewart. This elaborate memorial was completed in 1885. Mrs. Stewart died the following year. In 2008, the Cathedral of the Incarnation underwent a multimillion-dollar renovation and rehabilitation project, which was completed in 2012.

Voters selected Mineola (in the town of North Hempstead) as the county seat of the new county of Nassau in November 1898 (before Mineola incorporated as a village in 1906 and set its boundaries), winning out over Hicksville and Hempstead. The Garden City Company (founded in 1893 by Alexander Turney Stewart's heirs) donated 4 acres (1.6 ha) of land for the county buildings just south of the Mineola train station and the present-day Incorporated Village of Mineola, in the Town of Hempstead. The land and the buildings have a Mineola postal address but are within the present-day village of Garden City, which did not incorporate or set its boundaries until 1919. The early village did well due to its proximity to Hempstead, at the time Long Island's commercial center. In time, thanks to the railroad and automobiles, Garden City's population increased.

In its early years, the press called Garden City "Stewart's Folly" due to the lack of residents that Stewart had envisioned would populate his project.

=== 20th century ===
In 1910, Doubleday, Page, and Co., one of the world's most important publishers, moved its operations to the east side of Franklin Avenue and had its own train station called Country Life Press added nearby. Doubleday purchased much of the land on the west side of Franklin Avenue, and built estate homes for many of its executives on Fourth Street. In 1916, company co-founder and Garden City resident Walter Hines Page was named Ambassador to Great Britain.

In 1907, the Garden City Estates neighborhood – located to the immediate west of the original Garden City development – was established.

Aviation played a big role in the Village's history. The Nassau Boulevard Aerodrome, west of the Estates section, hosted the Second International Aviation Meet in 1911, which featured the first official airmail service. Other airfields included the Washington Avenue Field and the Hempstead Aerodrome, which became Roosevelt Field before being replaced by the Roosevelt Field Mall in the 1950s.

In 1919, Garden City incorporated as a village. Through this municipal incorporation, the Garden City Estates section – along with roughly all other areas within the boundaries of the Garden City School District – merged with the older part of Garden City, being incorporated into the new village's territory. This was made possible through an agreement reached between all major neighborhoods in the new village, to ensure balanced representation in the village government and to reduce opposition to the plan by addressing such concerns; this agreement is known as the Community Agreement.

Garden City's growth during the early 20th century promoted the development of many nearby towns, including Stewart Manor, Garden City Park, Garden City South and East Garden City.

The Village is home to three golf courses, the first having been laid out under Devereux Emmet's direction in 1896 and now called the Garden City Golf Club. Subsequently, the now-named Cherry Valley Club (originally Salisbury Club) and Garden City Country Club opened. For a short time in the late 1920s a fourth course existed, the Old Westbury Golf Club (initially the Intercollegiate Golf Club), east of Clinton Road (CR 1).

In the 1920s, the community continued to grow, with houses built in Garden City Estates as well as the eastern section of Garden City. Housing construction slowed after the 1929 stock market crash. But in the 1930s, hundreds of houses were built to accommodate a population boom, though Garden City used a strict zoning code to preserve Stewart's vision. The Village retained a sense of orderly development, true to its rigorously planned roots.

Starting in the 1930s, many branches of well-known New York City stores – including Best & Co., Saks Fifth Avenue, Bloomingdale's, and Lord & Taylor – opened stores along Franklin Avenue within Garden City. All of these have subsequently closed due to relocation to nearby Roosevelt Field Mall or closure, and their large buildings were subsequently converted into office and medical spaces.

After World War II, following a trend of urban residents moving to the suburbs, Garden City continued to grow. Postwar construction filled out Garden City's borders with many split-level and ranch-style homes, with construction occurring in the town's far eastern, northern and western sections. The Waldorf School of Garden City was founded in 1947 (one of the first Waldorf schools in the United States), originally as part of Adelphi University. The village's new public high school was constructed in 1956, supplementing the original Cherry Valley school, which opened in 1925.

The flat expanse of the land adjacent to Garden City allowed its use for military activities. For the Civil War, Camp Winfield Scott existed, for the Spanish-American War of 1898, Camp Black was established, and for World War I in 1917, Camp Albert Mills occupied land in the southeast part of the village. Camp Mills was decommissioned after the war, but the airbase Mitchel Field, established at the same time just east of the Village, existed until 1962.

In the 1960s, The World discotheque in Garden City featured multi-media supplied by USCO.

In the 1970s, the old Garden City Hotel declared bankruptcy and closed. It was demolished in 1973. A new Garden City Hotel was constructed on the site. In 1978, fifty of the original structures known as the A. T. Stewart Era Buildings were designated a national historic district and listed on the National Register of Historic Places.

In 1989, St. Paul's School closed. In 1993, it was purchased by the Village of Garden City, eventually designating St. Paul's and its property as "park land. St. Mary's School, the sister school of St. Paul's, was demolished in 2002. Since then, six large single-family houses have been built on the property.

The village-operated Garden City Public Library, first established in 1952 as a volunteer service, now serves its residents from a building erected in 1973.

On December 7, 1993, the Long Island Rail Road's Merillon Avenue station, which is partially within the village, was the location of the Long Island Rail Road massacre, in which six people were murdered and 19 injured in a racially motivated mass shooting by Colin Ferguson, a black Jamaican immigrant.

=== 21st century ===
In 2001, 23 Garden City residents were murdered in the September 11 attacks. Every year on the anniversary of the attack, the Garden City Fire Department holds a remembrance ceremony. A bell tolls after the reading of each of the 23 residents' names, which are etched in the memorial monument stone on the Village Green.

The village celebrated its centennial in 2019 – 100 years after its incorporation as a village.

== Geography ==
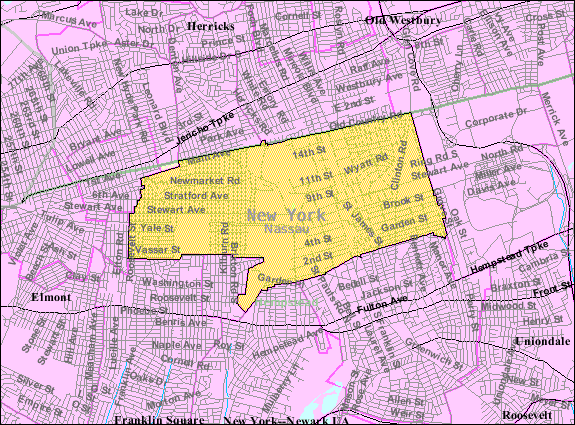
U.S. census map of Garden City

According to the U.S. Census Bureau, the village has an area of 5.3 square miles (14 km^{2}), all land.

The village lost some territory between the 1990 census and the 2000 census.

Garden City is about 18.5 miles (29.8 km) east of Midtown Manhattan in New York City.

=== Drainage ===
Garden City is primarily within the Mill River Watershed, though its westernmost portions are within the Hook Creek Watershed; the dividing line between the two runs north–south, roughly along Nassau Boulevard.

Both the Mill River and Hook Creek Watersheds are within the Long Island Sound/Atlantic Ocean Watershed.

=== Climate ===
According to the Köppen climate classification, Garden City has a Humid subtropical climate (type Cfa) with cool, wet winters and hot, humid summers. Precipitation is uniform throughout the year, with slight spring and fall peaks.

Climate data for Garden City, New York, 1991–2020 normals, extremes 1999–present
Month	Jan	Feb	Mar	Apr	May	Jun	Jul	Aug	Sep	Oct	Nov	Dec	Year
Record high °F (°C)	71 (22)	73 (23)	85 (29)	94 (34)	97 (36)	103 (39)	105 (41)	104 (40)	100 (38)	90 (32)	83 (28)	76 (24)	105 (41)
Mean daily maximum °F (°C)	39 (4)	43 (6)	50 (10)	61 (16)	70 (21)	80 (27)	85 (29)	83 (28)	76 (24)	65 (18)	55 (13)	45 (7)	63 (17)
Mean daily minimum °F (°C)	26 (−3)	28 (−2)	34 (1)	42 (6)	51 (11)	61 (16)	66 (19)	65 (18)	58 (14)	48 (9)	40 (4)	31 (−1)	46 (8)
Record low °F (°C)	−10 (−23)	−7 (−22)	3 (−16)	13 (−11)	32 (0)	43 (6)	50 (10)	48 (9)	38 (3)	27 (−3)	10 (−12)	−1 (−18)	−10 (−23)
Average precipitation inches (mm)	3.62 (92)	3.17 (81)	4.35 (110)	4.15 (105)	3.90 (99)	3.85 (98)	4.40 (112)	3.72 (94)	3.91 (99)	4.08 (104)	3.73 (95)	3.82 (97)	46.7 (1,186)
Source: The Weather Channel

==== Plant zone ====
According to the United States Department of Agriculture (USDA), Garden City is within hardiness zone 7b.

=== Greater Garden City area ===
In addition to the Incorporated Village of Garden City, the Garden City 11530 ZIP code includes another incorporated village, Stewart Manor, and two unincorporated areas of the Town of Hempstead: East Garden City (which was absorbed by the CDP of Uniondale in the 2010s) and Garden City South.

== Demographics ==
Historical population
Census	Pop.	Note	%±
1880	574		—
1920	2,420		—
1930	7,180		196.7%
1940	11,223		56.3%
1950	14,486		29.1%
1960	23,948		65.3%
1970	25,373		6.0%
1980	22,927		−9.6%
1990	21,686		−5.4%
2000	21,672		−0.1%
2010	22,371		3.2%
2020	23,272		4.0%
U.S. Decennial Census

=== Racial and ethnic composition ===
Garden City village, New York – Racial and ethnic composition Note: the US Census treats Hispanic/Latino as an ethnic category. This table excludes Latinos from the racial categories and assigns them to a separate category. Hispanics/Latinos may be of any race.
Race / Ethnicity (NH = Non-Hispanic)	Pop 2000	Pop 2010	Pop 2020	% 2000	% 2010	% 2020
White alone (NH)	19,938	20,034	19,344	92.00%	89.55%	83.12%
Black or African American alone (NH)	254	294	212	1.17%	1.31%	0.91%
Native American or Alaska Native alone (NH)	11	6	12	0.05%	0.03%	0.05%
Asian alone (NH)	706	792	1,589	3.26%	3.54%	6.83%
Native Hawaiian or Pacific Islander alone (NH)	7	1	7	0.03%	0.00%	0.03%
Other race alone (NH)	18	29	110	0.08%	0.13%	0.47%
Mixed race or Multiracial (NH)	138	212	512	0.64%	0.95%	2.20%
Hispanic or Latino (any race)	600	1,003	1,486	2.77%	4.48%	6.39%
Total	21,672	22,371	23,272	100.00%	100.00%	100.00%

=== 2020 census ===
As of the 2020 census, Garden City had a population of 23,272. The median age was 41.8 years. 24.0% of residents were under the age of 18 and 18.9% of residents were 65 years of age or older. For every 100 females there were 90.3 males, and for every 100 females age 18 and over there were 85.9 males age 18 and over.

The population density was 4,059.5 inhabitants per square mile (1,567.4/km^{2}). 100.0% of residents lived in urban areas, while 0.0% lived in rural areas.

There were 7,513 households in Garden City, of which 37.2% had children under the age of 18 living in them. Of all households, 70.6% were married-couple households, 8.1% were households with a male householder and no spouse or partner present, and 19.8% were households with a female householder and no spouse or partner present. About 18.1% of all households were made up of individuals and 12.5% had someone living alone who was 65 years of age or older.

There were 7,715 housing units, of which 2.6% were vacant. The homeowner vacancy rate was 0.7% and the rental vacancy rate was 6.6%.

==== Income and poverty ====
The median income for a household in the village was $186,607. The per capita income for the village was $83,823.

== Arts and culture ==
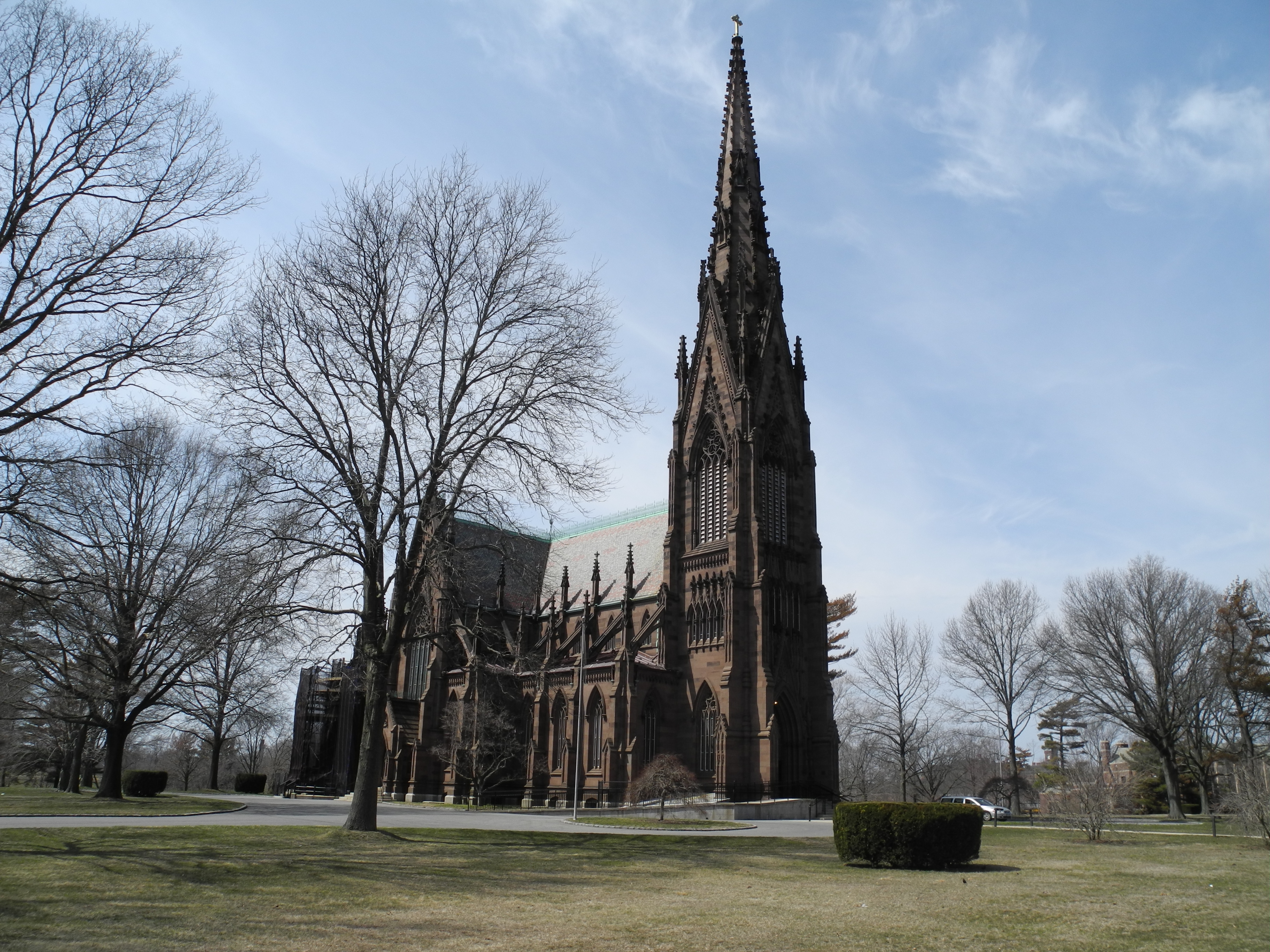
The Cathedral of the Incarnation in 2013

Garden City is home to the landmarked Cathedral of the Incarnation; this landmarked cathedral – the tallest building in the village – is the seat of the Episcopal Diocese of Long Island. The Village of Garden City's local building laws specify that no building within village limits can be taller than the cathedral.

== Parks and recreation ==
The Village of Garden City owns and operates several park and recreational facilities throughout the village. These facilities include the Garden City Community Park and the Garden City Village Pool, Edgemere Park, the Hemlock Playground, Rainbow Monument Park, Triangle Park, St. Paul's Recreation Complex, the Garden City Senior Center, and several other parks and recreational facilities of varying sizes and amenities.

Village-owned park and recreational facilities are maintained by the Village of Garden City Department of Recreation and Parks.

== Government ==
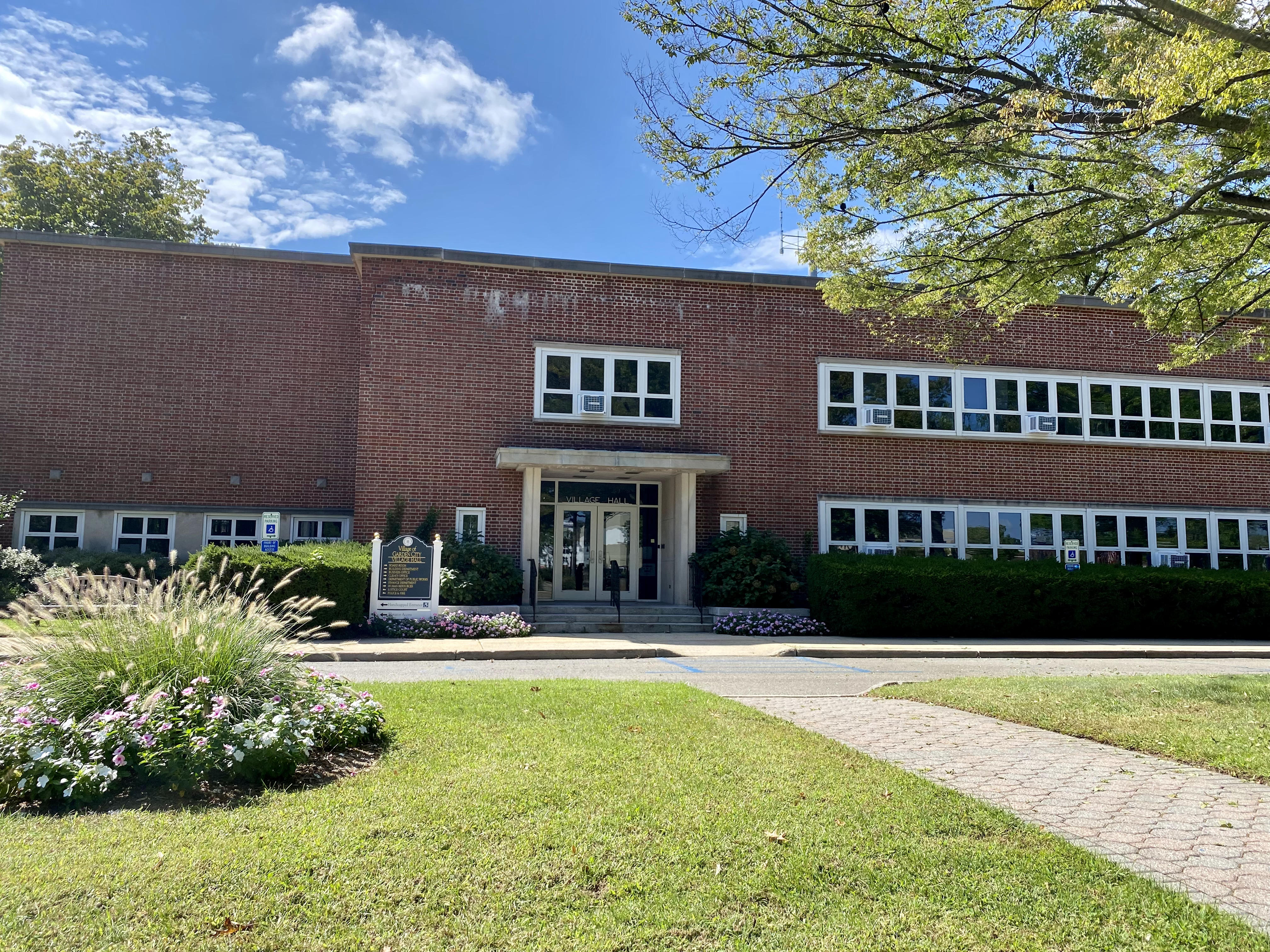
Garden City Village Hall in 2021

=== Village government ===
==== Board of Trustees ====
The Village of Garden City is governed by the Garden City Board of Trustees, which consists of eight members, including a mayor and trustees. Each trustee serves a two-year term, without compensation.

As of June 2026, the Mayor of Garden City is Edward T. Finneran.

===== Community Agreement =====
Map of Garden City, showing the boundaries of the four Property Owners' Associations, which form the Community Agreement zones

The Mayor and Trustees are elected via a "Community Agreement," in which the Village's four Property Owners' Associations – East, West, Central, and Estates, representing the different areas of the Village – hold primary elections in January. Winners are entered on the official ballot in March as the "Community Agreement Party."

From the time of the Village's incorporation until 2021, the candidates were selected by committees on the Property Owners' Associations, upon submitting a letter and resume.

==== Village Administrator ====
Additionally, the Board of Trustees hires a village administrator, which oversees village operations and performs many of the duties that a village clerk would usually do. The Village Administrator is Ralph V. Suozzi – the former Mayor of the City of Glen Cove and the cousin of U.S. Congressman Thomas R. Suozzi.

==== Other departments ====
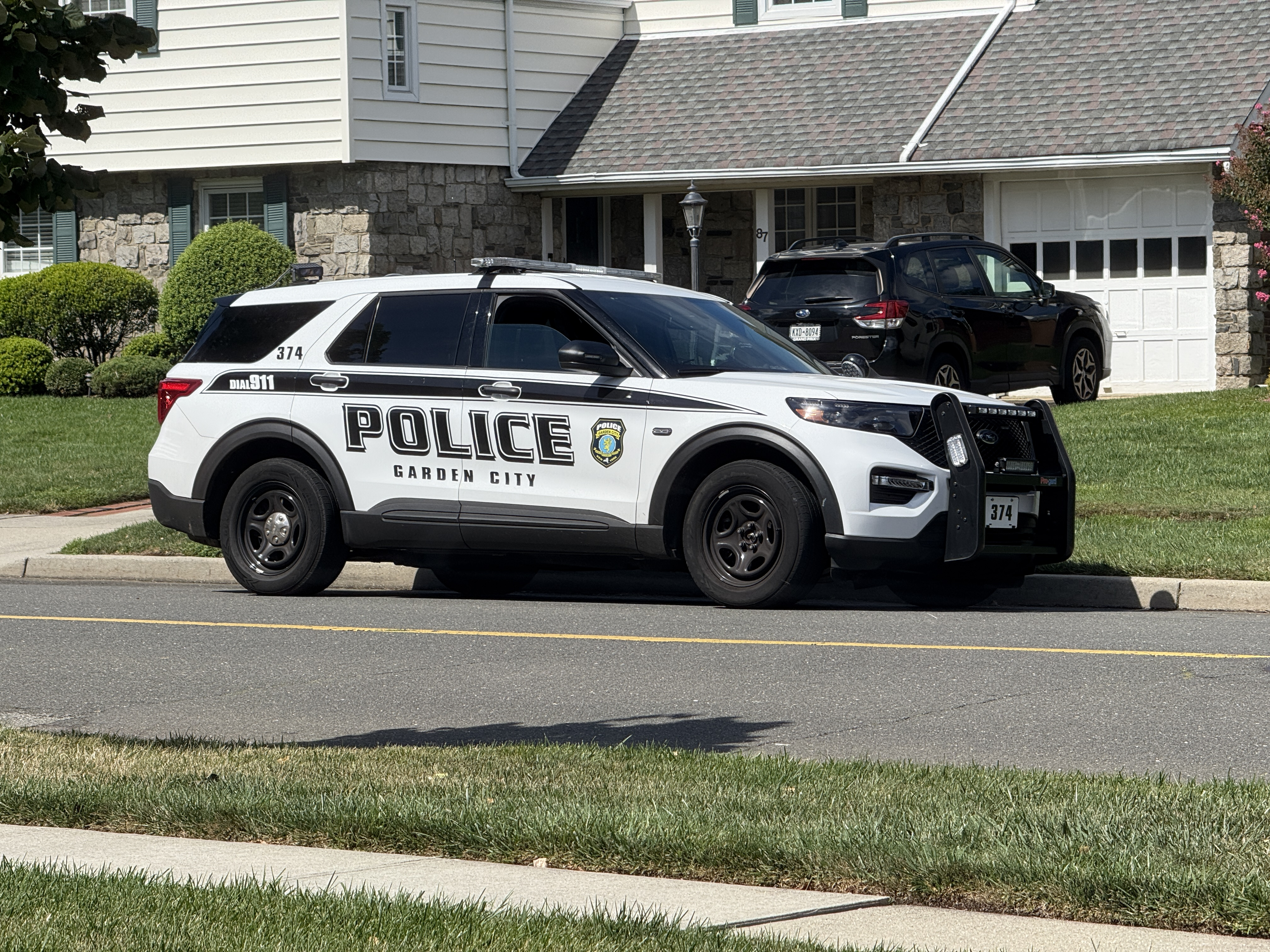
A Garden City Police Department patrol car in 2025

Garden City has its own police department and volunteer fire department. Firefighting operations are conducted from three fire houses across the Village.

The Department of Recreation and Parks maintains many programs for Village residents, and operates the Community Pool in the Summer months. The Senior Center is used by all ages for meetings and recreational activities. In addition, this commission is responsible for the maintenance of the trees located on streets and municipal property. One of the most important features of the Village is the prohibition of power lines on most streets, allowing the proper development of its street trees.

The Department of Public Works is responsible for the upkeep of the Village. Its equipment is maintained by its own staff at its municipal garage. It provides garbage and rubbish collection, water service, and street maintenance including snow plowing.

=== Representation in higher government ===
==== Town representation ====
The portions of Garden City located within the Town of Hempstead – the overwhelming majority of the village's territory – is located in the Town of Hempstead's 2nd council district, which as of August 2025 is represented on the Hempstead Town Council by village resident Thomas E. Muscarella (R–Garden City). Meanwhile, the small portion within the Town of North Hempstead is located in the Town of North Hempstead's 3rd council district, which as of August 2025 is represented on the North Hempstead Town Council by Dennis J. Walsh (R–Mineola).

==== Nassau County representation ====
The Village of Garden City is in Nassau County's 8th Legislative district, which as of August 2025 is represented in the Nassau County Legislature by John J. Giuffrè (R–Stewart Manor).

==== New York State representation ====
===== New York State Assembly =====
Garden City is in the New York State Assembly's 19th State Assembly district, which as of August 2025 is represented by Edward P. Ra (R–Garden City South).

===== New York State Senate =====
Garden City is in the New York State Senate's 6th State Senate district, which as of August 2025 is represented by Siela A. Bynoe (D–Westbury).

==== Federal representation ====
===== United States Congress =====
The Village of Garden City is almost entirely in New York's 4th Congressional district, which as of August 2025 is represented by Laura A. Gillen (D-Baldwin). The small portion of the village in the Town of North Hempstead is represented by Thomas R. Suozzi (D–Glen Cove), and is in New York's 3rd Congressional district.

===== United States Senate =====
Like the rest of New York, Garden City is represented in the United States Senate by Charles E. Schumer (D) and Kirsten Gillibrand (D).

=== Politics ===
Garden City has long been a bastion of the Republican Party, giving Republicans in local, statewide, and national races large margins of the vote. In the 2024 United States presidential election, Donald Trump (R) won a majority of the vote in Garden City.

== Education ==
=== K–12 education ===
==== Public schools ====
Almost all of Garden City – including nearly all residential properties within the village – is located within the boundaries of the Garden City Union Free School District. A small portion of Terrace Avenue and the western half of Lydia Lane – along with westernmost portion of the Garden City Public Works Yard, meanwhile, are located within the Franklin Square Union Free School District (grades pre-K–6) and Sewanhaka Central High School District (grades 7–12).

Meanwhile, there are two small, uninhabited areas of the village that are in other districts. The northeastern corner of the village by the Clinton Road–Old Country Road intersection is within the boundaries of the Uniondale Union Free School District; and an industrial property in the small portion of the village within the Town of North Hempstead is located within the boundaries of the Mineola Union Free School District.

==== Private schools ====
One independent school (the Waldorf School of Garden City (grades pre-K–12)), and two Roman Catholic elementary schools (K–8) (St. Joseph School and St. Anne School), are within the Village of Garden City. The former St. Paul's School and St. Mary's School are now defunct.

=== Higher education ===
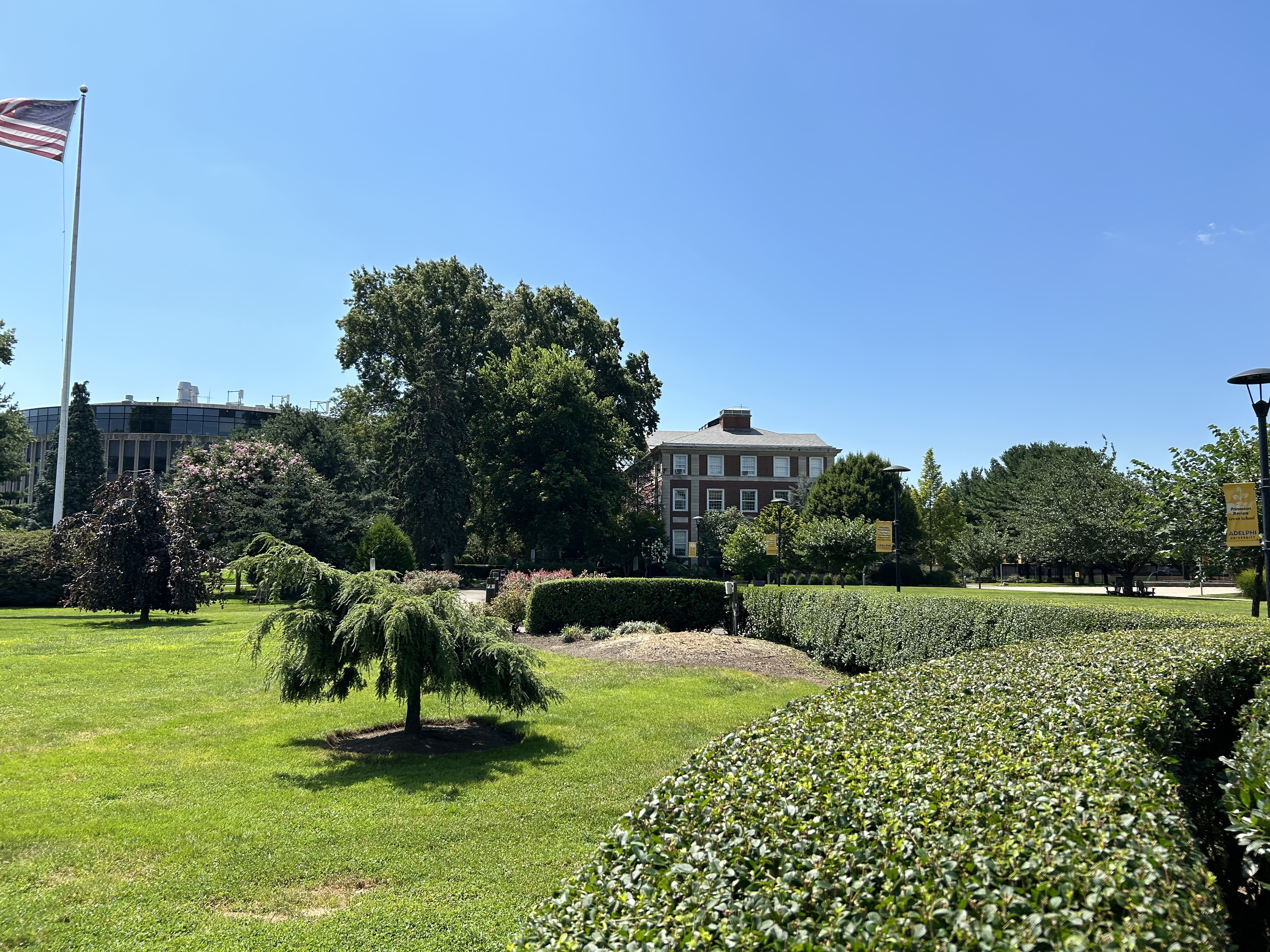
The quad at Adelphi University

In 1929, Adelphi College, which later became Adelphi University, moved from Brooklyn to its present, 76-acre (31 ha) campus in Garden City – a move that, in turn, made the school the first four-year college in either Nassau or Suffolk counties.

== Media ==
Garden City is the city of license for PBS member station WLIW, channel 21, which maintains studio facilities at One Worldwide Plaza in Midtown Manhattan and an auxiliary street-level studio at Lincoln Center on Manhattan's Upper West Side; their transmitter is located atop One World Trade Center. WLIW also maintains a production studio at its former transmitter site on Long Island, in the nearby Nassau County hamlet of Plainview.

Garden City is primarily served by the New York City media market.

== Infrastructure ==
=== Transportation ===
==== Road ====
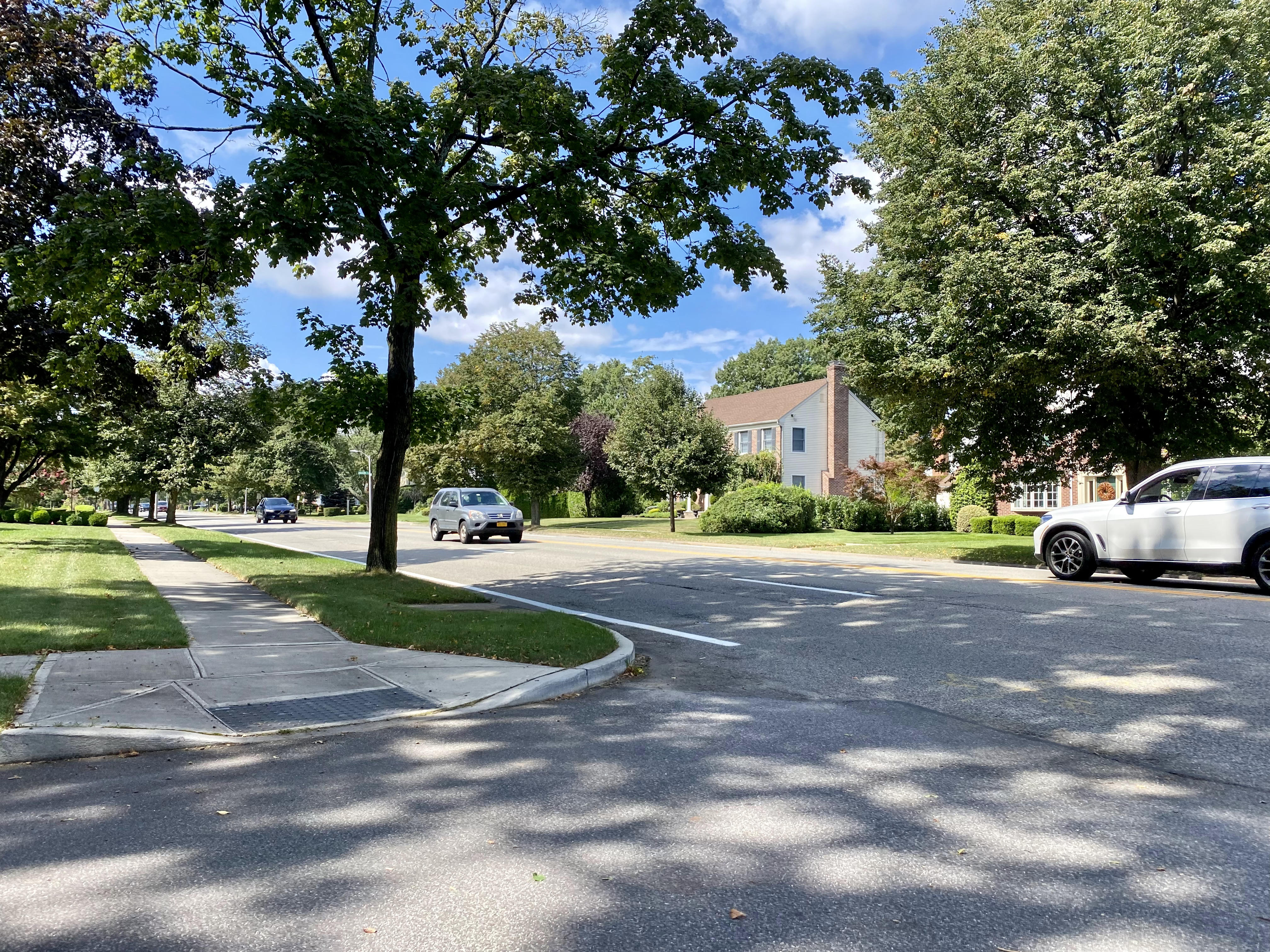
Stewart Avenue (CR 177) within the village in 2021

Clinton Road (CR 1) traverses the village and is one of its major north–south thoroughfares. Stewart Avenue (CR 177), meanwhile, runs through the middle of the village and serves as its primary east–west thoroughfare. Other major roads within the village are Cathedral Avenue (CR C31), Cherry Valley Avenue (CR C38), Franklin Avenue (CR 5A), Nassau Boulevard (CR D66), New Hyde Park Road (CR 5B), Old Country Road (CR 25), Rockaway Avenue (CR E06), and Washington Avenue (CR 7A).

Additionally, the Village of Garden City maintains approximately 74 miles (119 km) of roads.

===== Road layout =====
Much of Garden City's street network is laid out to resemble the traditional street grid. A major exception is the Mott Section, which features a series of parallel, semicircular streets and numerous north–south streets connecting the crescents.

==== Rail ====
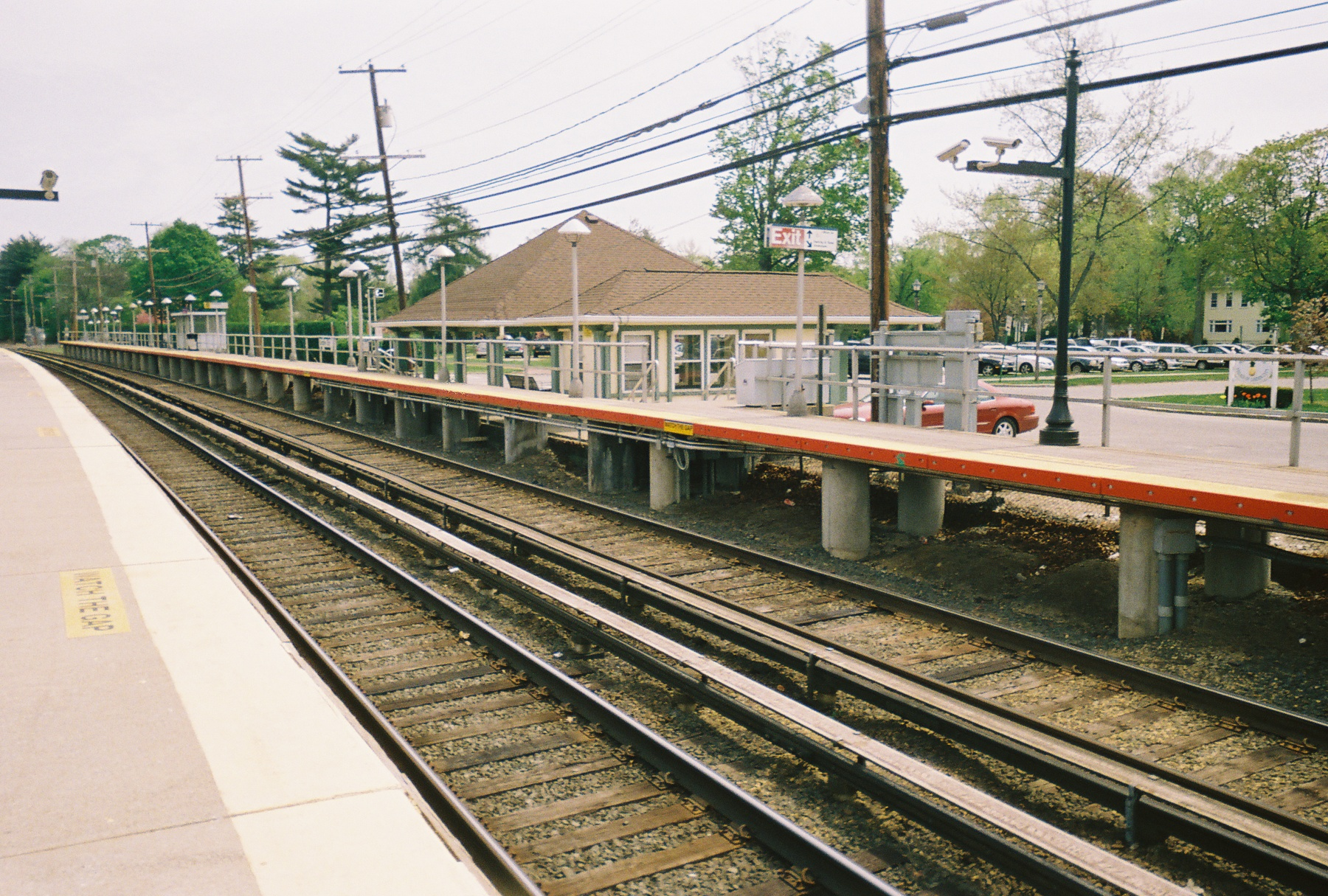
The Garden City Long Island Rail Road station in 2009

There are five Long Island Rail Road (LIRR) train stations in the village: Stewart Manor, Nassau Boulevard, Garden City, and Country Life Press on the LIRR's Hempstead Branch – and Merillon Avenue on the LIRR's Main Line.

==== Bus ====
As of August 2025, nine Nassau Inter-County Express (NICE) bus routes pass through and serve the village: the n15, the n22, the n22x, the n24, the n25, the n25/58, the n27, the n35, the n40 and the n40x.

=== Utilities ===
==== Natural gas ====
National Grid USA provides natural gas to all properties in Garden City connected to natural gas lines.

==== Power ====
PSEG Long Island provides power to all homes and businesses within Garden City, on behalf of the Long Island Power Authority.

==== Sewage ====
Garden City is connected to sanitary sewers. The village maintains a sanitary sewer system which flows into Nassau County's sanitary sewer system, which treats the sewage from the village's system at the Nassau County-owned sewage treatment plants on the South Shore.

==== Water ====
The Village of Garden City owns and maintains its own water supply system. Most of the village is served by this municipal water supply system, but the Water Authority of Western Nassau County services Village residents in the westernmost part of the Village, west of New Hyde Park Road.

== Notable landmarks ==
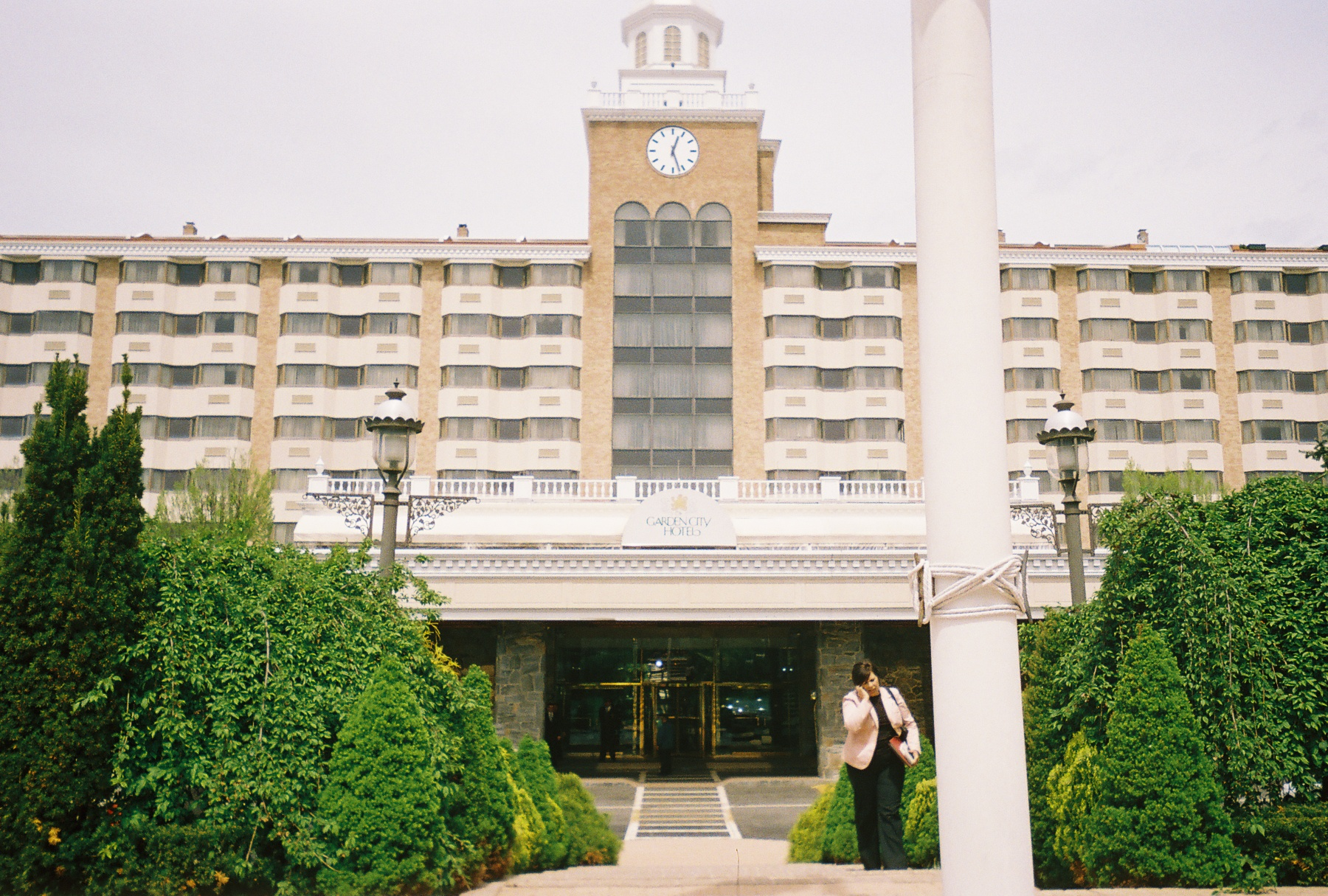
The Garden City Hotel in 2009

- Adelphi University
- Apostle Houses
- Cathedral of the Incarnation
- Garden City Hotel
- Garden City High School
- Nassau County Courthouse
- Theodore Roosevelt Executive and Legislative Building (Old Nassau County Courthouse)
- St. Paul's School

== Legacy ==
Garden City inspired the names of several nearby municipalities, and is the namesake of Garden Village, Kentucky.

== Notable people ==
- Madeleine Albright (1937–2022), diplomat, political scientist, and United States Secretary of State
- Herbert M. Allison, businessman
- Eddie Arcaro (1916–1997), jockey, and Triple Crown winner
- Jason Blake, NHL All-Star
- Steven Chu, Secretary of Energy, Nobel Prize winner in physics
- Cliff Compton, retired professional wrestler who is a former WWE Tag Team Champion
- Bruce Coslet, former New York Jets head coach
- Matt Daley, New York Yankees pitcher
- Dave DeBusschere, NBA Hall of Famer
- Nelson DeMille, author
- Kent Desormeaux, jockey
- John Gibson, journalist
- Kemp Hannon, New York state senator
- Liza Huber, soap opera actress, Passions
- Joe Iconis, musical theater writer
- Dave Jennings, former New York Giants punter
- Greg Kelly, television anchor
- Harvey J. Levin, pioneer of communications economics, holder of Long Island's first research chair, Hofstra University
- Susan Lucci, actress; grew up in Garden City, worked at the Garden City Hotel, and in 1978 moved back to Garden City
- Eric Mangini, former New York Jets coach
- Christopher Masterson, actor
- Danny Masterson, actor
- Kevin Mawae, former NFL Pro Bowl center and president of NFL Player's Association
- Tom McArdle, Oscar-nominated film editor, Spotlight
- Kiaran McLaughlin, horse trainer
- Richard Migliore, horse jockey
- Mike Milbury, ex-New York Islanders Head Coach and General Manager
- Alexandra Miller, Florida politician and businesswoman
- Joe Mohen, Internet entrepreneur
- Bill Moyers, journalist
- Elliott Murphy, singer-songwriter
- Joe Namath, former NFL quarterback
- Walter Hines Page, United States Ambassador to England during World War I, and co-founder of Doubleday, Page and Co. publishing
- Žigmund Pálffy, four-time NHL All-Star
- Mark Parrish, NHL All-Star
- Larry Pasquale, former special teams coach for the New York Jets
- Kash Patel, FBI Director, former chief-of-staff of the U.S. Secretary of Defense.
- Ethan Phillips, television actor, Star Trek: Voyager
- Todd Pletcher, Award-winning thoroughbred horse trainer.
- Denis Potvin, NHL All-Star
- Nicole Rajičová, Olympic figure skater representing Slovakia.
- Kathleen Rice 4th District of New York Representative; grew up in Garden City on Nassau Boulevard
- Telly Savalas, actor
- Leslie Segrete, Trading Spaces carpenter, designer
- Dennis Seidenberg, two-time Stanley Cup Champion
- Tom Slattery, distance runner
- Lara Spencer, TV host
- Mark Streit, NHL All-Star
- Johnny Sylvester (1915–1990) received as a seriously ill child a promise from Babe Ruth that Ruth would hit a home run in the 1926 World Series on his behalf.
- John Tesh, musician, news anchor
- William B. Turner, World War I hero, recipient of the Medal of Honor
- Chris Weidman, UFC fighter
- Paul Zaloom, actor and puppeteer best known as Beakman on Beakman's World

== In popular culture ==
=== Film ===
The film The Spirit of St. Louis (1957), starring James Stewart, features Charles Lindbergh's historical flight to Paris from Roosevelt Field in East Garden City in 1927. Its first few scenes occur at the Garden City Hotel, where Lindbergh had a room reserved (but did not use, contrary to the film's portrayal), and the press corps stayed who were covering the event spent the night prior to his flight; Lindbergh was up all night working on his plane the night before the flight, although he did have dinner and a nap at the Garden City home of his friend, Gregory J. Brandewiede, at 105 Third Street. The opening shot of the film's first scene shows the hotel's front exterior and sign. Subsequent scenes take place – and were filmed – at Roosevelt Field – just outside the village's corporate limits.

Additionally, scenes for The Many Saints of Newark (2021) were filmed at a funeral home within the village.

Other notable films that have been filmed within – or otherwise have scenes set in or make reference to – Garden City include:

- The Antics of Ann (1917)
- Frankenstein Meets the Space Monster (1965)
- Election (1999)
- Boiler Room (2000)
- Street of the Dead (2008)
- The Judgment of Weeping Mary (2008)

=== Music ===
Musician and Garden City native John Tesh's fourth album (released in 1989) is titled Garden City (Cyprus Records) as a nod to his hometown; the album includes a song with the same title. The record company he created in 1995 and currently owns is Garden City Records.

== See also ==
- List of municipalities in New York
- East Garden City, New York
- Garden City Park, New York
- Garden City South, New York
- Garden Village, Kentucky
