= Plainview–Old Bethpage John F. Kennedy High School =

Public secondary school in Kennedy Drive, Plainview, New York, United States

Coordinates: 40°46′54″N 73°27′31″W

Plainview JFK High School
- 50 Kennedy Drive; Plainview, New York 11803; United States

Information
- Type: Public School
- Motto: "Excellence in Education"
- Established: 1966
- School district: Plainview-Old Bethpage Central School District
- CEEB code: 334532
- NCES School ID: 3623220
- Principal: Heather Dvorak
- Faculty: 145.17 FTEs
- Grades: 9th through 12th
- Enrollment: 1,709 (as of 2023–24)
- Student to teacher ratio: 11.77:1
- Campus type: Suburban
- Colors: Blue and white
- Athletics conference: NYSPHSAA Section 8
- Mascot: Plainview Hawks
- Newspaper: The Hawkeye
- Website: pobschools.org

Plainview – Old Bethpage John F. Kennedy High School is a four-year coeducational public high school located on Kennedy Drive in Plainview, Nassau County, Long Island, New York. Plainview-Old Bethpage John F. Kennedy High School is the only high school in the Plainview-Old Bethpage Central School District. It is fully accredited by the New York State Education Department. This school is registered with the College Board as Plainview – Old Bethpage/JFK High School, and is often referred to as POB (Plainview-Old Bethpage) JFK, especially for athletic purposes, to avoid confusion with nearby Bellmore JFK. As of 2015, Plainview-Old Bethpage John F. Kennedy High School was ranked 176th on Newsweek's list of top U.S High Schools.

As of the 2022–23 school year, the school had an enrollment of 1,657 students As of the 2018-19 school year there were 134.4 classroom teachers (on an FTE basis), for a student–teacher ratio of 11.4:1. There were 147 students (9.6% of enrollment) eligible for free lunch and 13 (0.8% of students) eligible for reduced-cost lunch.

== History ==
The school was opened in 1966 under the name John F. Kennedy High School. It was Plainview's second high school. Originally, all senior high school students went to Plainview High School, but were split by residential location when JFK High School opened. In 1991, Plainview-Old Bethpage High School and John F. Kennedy High School were merged into the John F. Kennedy High School building. The school was renamed Plainview-Old Bethpage John F. Kennedy High School. The newly merged school abandoned Plainview High School's colors of green and white in favor of John F. Kennedy's blue and white. Both the original Plainview High School mascot, the Gulls, and the John F. Kennedy High School mascot, the Eagles, were replaced with a new mascot, The Hawks. It is now the only public high school for residents of the community of Plainview and Old Bethpage.

== Overview ==
For the 2013–2014 school year, the student body of POBJFK was 82% white and 14% Asian or Native, Hawaiian/Other, or Pacific Islander, . All other races or ethnicities made up 0–3% of the student body. Eighty percent of teachers had a master's degree plus 30 hours or doctorate degrees. The school was named a Blue Ribbon School of Excellence in 1987-1988. Plainview-Old Bethpage John F. Kennedy High School was ranked 174 of 1600+ schools listed in Newsweek's America's Top High Schools 2015 list. It was also ranked 11th on Long Island.

For the 2013–2014 school year, 99% of graduates received a Regents Diploma. 77% of graduates received an Advanced Regents Diploma. 85% percent of 2013–2014 graduates went on to four-year colleges and 12% went on to two-year colleges. Zero percent went to the military and 1% to employment.

For the 2012-2013 school year, students achievements include 13 New York State Academic Excellence Award Winners, 2 Intel Science Talent Search Semi-Finalists, 5 Siemens Semi-Finalists, 2 Scholar Artists for Fine and Performing Arts, 12 All State Students for Fine and Performing Arts, 3 All Eastern Students for Fine and Performing Arts, and 13 LISFA Recognition Students for Fine and Performing Arts

=== Administration ===
Heather Dvorak is the current principal. James Murray was the longest serving principal, from the early 2000’s-2022.

=== Expansion ===
In 1991, the school underwent an expansion. During this time, 5 new tennis courts, a new track and pool, and two new classroom wings were added. Notwithstanding opposition by some residents, the school board eventually approved the expansion. In anticipation of the expansion, ninth grade classes were consolidated into the building in 1991 and the remaining grades in 1992. In addition, the gardening club landscaped the school grounds, creating a quarter acre garden on the northwestern side of the campus.

=== AP Macroeconomics ===
Based on a report released on January 24, 2012, Plainview-Old Bethpage JFK "was ranked as achieving the best overall performance last spring on an Advanced Placement test in macroeconomics," meaning that Plainview has the "strongest AP macroeconomics course in the world among schools in (its) size range," according to the College Board. This data referred to AP exams given in Spring 2004. The Plainview-Old Bethpage Central School District attributes this success to the district's sole macroeconomics teacher at the time, Ms. Jane Behrens.

=== Science Research ===
Plainview is known for its top-tier science research program. During the 2005–2006 school year, then-seniors Abhinav Khanna and Ben Pollack placed second nationally in the Siemens Competition (formerly Siemens Westinghouse Competition). During the 2012-2013 school year, then-senior Jinju Yi was a National Finalist and Regional Winner in the same competition. On December 3, 2013, Class of 2008 Seniors Janelle Schlossberger and Amanda Marinoff were named national winners in the Siemens Competition team category (for a $100,000 scholarship), with the creation of a molecule that can inhibit the production of drug-resistant tuberculosis strains.

== Robotics ==
Plainview is known for its award-winning Robotics program. Known as The POBots, they first competed in the FIRST Robotics Competition in 2000. Every year, this robotics team participates in the SBPLI regional at Hofstra University on Long Island (School- Business Partnerships of Long Island) SBPLI Homepage. Additionally, they participate in the NYC regional in the Javits Center. They have also been to the FIRST Championship. They have won the Chairman's Award, which is the most prestigious award in the regional competition, as well as the Engineering Inspiration award, the Judges award, team spirit award, and many others. Additionally, alumni from the team have founded a new team in Utica, called the second mouse, who has won the rookie all star award.The Second Mouse Homepage

== Athletics ==
The school offers numerous sports teams yearly including Tennis, Golf, Swimming, Basketball, Lacrosse, Football, Softball, Soccer, and Bowling just to name a few. The school has various rivalries with high schools neighboring hamlets such as Syosset High School, Jericho High School, and Farmingdale High School.

- The Boys Varsity Tennis Team were Long Island champions in 2004, 2007, 2008, 2012, and 2015.
- The Boys Varsity Baseball Team were Long Island Champions and New York State Runners Up in 2003.
- The Boys Varsity Volleyball Team were Long Island champions in 2006, 2007, and 2013.
- The Varsity Girls Cheerleading Squad made it to the National Competition in Florida in 2012-2013 and 2016–17

== Senior prank ==
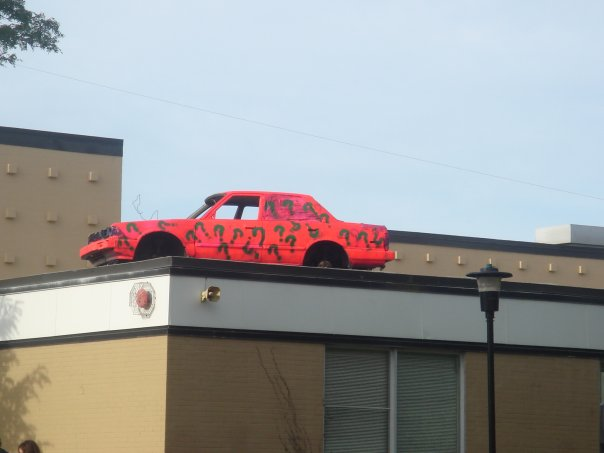
The Class of 2006's senior prank.

The POBJFK Class of 2006 pulled a senior prank in which students placed a car on the school's roof on the last day of classes. The car, or rather shell of a car, which was painted hot pink and covered in green question marks, was lifted onto the school's roof directly above Principal James Murray's office. Mr. Murray responded to the prank by wearing a hot pink tie with green question marks on it to the 2006 graduation.

== A Cappella ==
There are eight distinct student run A Cappella groups found in POBJFKHS: The Rolling Tones, Noteworthy, Under a Rest, B Sharps, Drastic Measures, On a High Note, Chock Full of Notes, and the Acafellas. The program features all groups in their winter and spring "Night of A Cappella." In 2015, "The Rolling Tones" and "Chock Full of Notes" were featured on Lifetime's "Pitch Slapped."

== Notable alumni ==
- Harrison Chad, 2010, actor, played Boots on Dora the Explorer and has appeared in multiple Broadway musicals. Attended Brown University
- Diane Franklin, 1980, actress on cinema and television
- Maxwell Jacob Friedman, 2014, professional wrestler for AEW Wrestling, AEW World Heavyweight Champion
- Brad Greenberg, 1972, basketball player and coach
- Seth Greenberg, 1974, basketball coach
- Marc Iavaroni, 1974, professional basketball player, coach
- Aaron Karo, 1997, author and comedian
- Marc Lawrence (filmmaker), 1977, screenwriter, film producer and film director.
- Frank London, 1976, Grammy award-winning composer, trumpeter and bandleader.
- Steven Markowitz, 2006, recording artist, Hoodie Allen
- Daniel Mendelsohn, 1978, award-winning author, critic, translator, Editor-at-Large of New York Review of Books, director of Robert B. Silvers Foundation
- Eric Mendelsohn, 1982, actor, writer, director
- Rod Morgenstein, 1971, drummer, played with rock bands Winger and Dixie Dregs.
- Joshua Tauberer 2000, civic hacker, open government activist, entrepreneur, and author
- Scott Ullger, Major League Baseball player
- Daniel I. Werfel, 1989, former Commissioner of the Internal Revenue Service
- Robin Young, 1968, radio and TV personality
