= Bethpage Purchase =

Land purchase on Long Island

The Bethpage Purchase was a 1687 land transaction in which Thomas Powell, Sr, bought more than 15 square miles (39 km^{2}; 9,600 acres) in central Long Island, New York, for £140 (English pounds sterling) from local American Indian tribes, including the Marsapeque, Matinecoc, and Sacatogue. This land, which includes present day Bethpage, East Farmingdale, Farmingdale, Old Bethpage, Plainedge, Plainview, South Farmingdale, and part of Melville, is approximately 3.5 miles (5.6 km) east to west and 5 mi (8.0 km) north to south, covering land on both sides of the present-day border between Nassau and Suffolk counties.

On October 18, 1695, Mawmee (alias Serewanos), William Chepy, Seurushung, and Wamussum made their marks on the sheepskin deed. The deed, which recognizes Powell had already been in possession of part of the land for more than seven years, is recorded in the Queens County Clerks office, and in it, the tribes reserved the right to pick berries and hunt on the property sold. At that time, people would fish in the Massatayun River, which then extended further north than it does now.

Powell called the land he purchased "Bethphage", because it was situated between two other places on Long Island, Jericho and Jerusalem, just as the biblical town of Bethphage (meaning "house of figs") was situated between Jericho and Jerusalem in Israel. Today, the Long Island place formerly called "Jerusalem" is known as Wantagh and Island Trees. The placename Jericho, also a Quaker settlement at that time, still has that name. Over time, the second "H" was dropped from the name, to spell "Bethpage". One of two houses Powell built in the area (circa 1700) still stands on Merritts Road in Farmingdale, just north of the Bethpage-Hempstead Turnpike.

Sources also mention Powell made a second purchase, in 1699, called the "Rim of the Woods Purchase", which includes land to the west of the original Bethpage Purchase; including most of present-day Bethpage and all the land in the northern section of present-day Plainedge (Boundary Avenue, north to Old Motor Parkway, and Hicksville Road east to Cedar Drive). By 1700, very little of Long Island had not been purchased from the indigenous peoples by the English colonists, and townships controlled whatever land had not already been distributed among the new settlers. Thomas Whitson bought one-third of the Bethpage Purchase in 1700, and died there in 1742 at the age of ninety. After Powell's death in 1721/1722, his remaining property was divided among his children and their heirs, leading to its evolution into several farming communities.

Three separate communities within the original Bethpage Purchase have, at one time or another, been named Bethpage. The first community was centered in present-day Farmingdale around Merritts Road, just north of the Hempstead-Bethpage Turnpike; the second was present-day Old Bethpage; and the latest is present-day Bethpage.

== Thomas Powell ==
Powell was born in August or October 1641. Sources disagree on whether he was born in Wales, England or in Connecticut. Powell's father made arrangements for Powell to become an indentured servant or apprentice when he was about 12 years old. After his apprenticeship ended at the age of 21, he married in 1663/64 and took up residence in the Town of Huntington, where he bought land and was chosen for several local offices. In 1687, the Governor of New York asked the Town of Huntington to purchase all lands from the Indians not already purchased, and Powell was chosen as the buyer. Powell died February 28, 1722 [O.S. February 28, 1721].

== The deed ==
The deed reads as follows:

To all christian people to whome this p'sent writing shall come, or in any wise concerne. Bee itt knowne that we, Mawmee, alias Serewanos, William Chepy, with ye rest of ye Indian proprietors whose names are hereunto subscribed, Indian proprietors of Massapege, upon Long Island, for and in consideration of £140, in hand paid, and by us ye sd Indians received, in full payment and satisfaction, have granted, sold, &c., unto Thomas Powell, sen'r, a certaine percell or tract of land, beginning att ye west corner, att a dirty hole upon ye Brushy plaines, near Mannatto Hill, from thence up a Hollow on ye south side of Mannatto Hill, and out of that Hollow a Cross ye hills, eastward pretty near Huntington, south line, to ye Brushy plaine on ye east side ye hills, and so along ye east side of ye vallee that goes to ye east branch of Massapege Swamp, the head of ye swamp being the S. E. corner, and from thence to rang along William ffrost line until wee come to west neck, north-east bounder, belonging to Oyster Bay, and from ye said N. E. bounder of ye west neck, and soe to Run on the west side of ye Hollow that comes from ye west branch of Massepege Swamp, so far as there is any trees, and from thense to ye sd Hole of dirt and water near Mannatto Hill, called by the Indians Messtoppass, part of above bounded lands having been in ye possession of ye sd Thomas Powell above seven years before the signing and dellevry hereof.

And ye aforesamentioned Indians have put ye sd Thomas Powell in lawfull and peaceable possession by ye dillevery of Turf and Twigg: Only the sd Indians doe reserve ye liberty of hunting and gathering huckleberrys upon ye sd land, as they shall see cause. In witness whereof, we, ye above named Indians, have set our hands and seals, this 18th day of ye 8th month, 1695.

In presence of BENJAMIN SEAMAN AND SOLOMON TOWNSEND.

....SEREWANOS, X his mark, [L. s.]

....WILLIAM CHEPY, X his mark, [L. s.]

....SEURUSHRUNG, X his mark, [L. s.]

....WAMUSSUM, X his mark, [L. s.]

A map using some present day landmarks is available here.

== Bethpage and Hardscrabble: modern Farmingdale ==
The original Bethpage Friends Meeting House, on Quaker Meeting House Road, Farmingdale, built in 1741, was the first house of worship constructed in the Bethpage Purchase area. The present structure, built in 1890, is the third meeting house at this site, the previous two having been destroyed by fire. It is nearly surrounded by Farmingdale's oldest cemetery.

In the 1830s, anticipating construction of the Long Island Rail Road (LIRR), land developer Ambrose George purchased a large tract of land in the eastern part of the Bethpage Purchase lands, between the community then known as Bethpage and a large area in Suffolk County called Hardscrabble. He built a general store just east of the Bethpage community, and named his property Farmingdale. When the LIRR started service to the area in October 1841, it used the name Farmingdale for its latest stop, here, on the line it was building to Greenport. Stagecoaches took people from the Farmingdale station to Islip, Babylon, Patchogue, Oyster Bay South, and West Neck (Huntington area). By December 1841, construction was completed to the next stop on the LIRR, a temporary stop called Babylon Station, and later to a permanent station called Deer Park, reducing some, but not all, stagecoach traffic from Farmingdale.

In March 1842, Ambrose George donated some of his land for the construction of the first Methodist meeting house in Farmingdale. Until that time, the only other place of worship was the Quaker Meeting House northwest of the Farmingdale LIRR station. A post office opened July 31, 1845, using the name Farmingdale. The name Hardscrabble continued to appear on maps for the area further east in Suffolk County, in the vicinity of present-day Wyandanch. In 1912, the New York State School of Agriculture on Long Island opened in East Farmingdale.

In 1912, Benjamin Franklin Yoakum, a wealthy railroad executive, acquired 1,368 acres (5.5 km^{2}) of land along the northern edge of Farmingdale extending into what is now Old Bethpage. Yoakum hired Devereux Emmet to design and build an 18-hole golf course on the land, which opened for play in 1923, and which Yoakum leased to the private Lenox Hills Country Club. When Yoakum died in 1929, there was conflict over usage of the leased lands. The Yoakum heirs eventually sold the property to the State of New York, and Bethpage State Park opened there to the public in 1932, with more golf courses soon being constructed.

== Bedelltown, Jerusalem Station (and Jerusalem), Central Park: modern Bethpage ==
An early name for the northern section of present-day Bethpage was Bedelltown, a name in use for over 100 years. The Bedells, with 15 families in the area, were one of the larger families present when the federal census of 1790 was taken, and were later responsible for the first school in the district. The area along Plainview Road, from Haypath Road to Central Avenue, was the first section of present-day Bethpage to be built up. In addition to the Bedells and the Powells, there were the Pearsalls, Whitsons, and Stymuses. Bedelltown was the name of one of the local school districts before the formation of the present Bethpage Union Free School District. The name Bedelltown, with variant spellings, appeared on maps in 1873, 1898, 1906, at least as late as 1927, and was still in use in 1928.

In 1841, train service began to the Farmingdale LIRR station. In 1851, there is still no indication of any stop between Hicksville and Farmingdale. By 1854, there is reference to a Jerusalem Station, likely near the current Bethpage LIRR station. On January 29, 1857, a local post office opened, also named Jerusalem Station. LIRR schedules listed the station also as simply Jerusalem. Residents succeeded in changing the name of the post office to Central Park, effective March 1, 1867 (respelled as Centralpark from 1895 to 1899).

By 1873, the Central Railroad of Long Island had a regularly scheduled stop, using both the name Central Park and Jerusalem, near Stewart Avenue and Motor Lane in Plainedge, approximately 0.75 miles (1.21 km) south of the present Bethpage station.

In 1907, William Kissam Vanderbilt II began construction of the Long Island Motor Parkway, one of the country's first highways. Nine miles of the road were completed from modern Westbury through Central Park to modern Old Bethpage in time to be used as part of the October 1908 Vanderbilt Cup motor race course. The road eventually stretched 45 miles (72 km) from Queens to Lake Ronkonkoma, New York. An estimated 200,000 to 250,000 people attended the races. Famous people came out to Central Park to watch the races and stayed at the Beau Sejour Hotel.

The Central Park Fire Company was organized in April 1910, and incorporated in May 1911. In May 1923 the Central Park Water District was created.

Following the opening of nearby Bethpage State Park in 1932, local residents again petitioned to change the name of the post office, this time to Bethpage. The name Bethpage was, however, already in use by an adjacent community, which resisted suggestions of a merger and instead renamed itself Old Bethpage. The change from Central Park to Bethpage, effective October 1, 1936, was one of the last complete name changes of Nassau County's post offices.

From 1936 until 1994, Bethpage was home to the Grumman Aircraft Engineering Corporation, which made, among other things, the F-14 Tomcat and the Apollo Lunar Module for Moon landings. (Bethpage is thus mentioned in the film Apollo 13.) Cablevision Systems Corporation, a Fortune 500 company, is headquartered in Grumman's former main office.

== Bethpage: modern Old Bethpage ==
A railroad spur completed in 1873, known as the Bethpage Branch of the Central Railroad of Long Island, ran to a brickworks plant which had opened in the Old Bethpage area in the 1860s. The railway was built to transport bricks for the construction of A.T. Stewart's Garden City. For a few years, regularly scheduled passenger traffic also appeared in timetables, with the station being called Bethpage. The line was abandoned in 1942. Remnants of a locomotive turntable can be found in the woods of Bethpage State Park on the east side of Round Swamp Road. The brickyard continued operations under different owners until 1981, with different sections known variously as Bethpage Brickworks, Queens County Brick Manufacturing Company, Post Brick Company, and (after Nassau County split from Queens County in 1899) Nassau Brick Company. At least for part of the 1930s, the brickworks used Farmingdale for its postal address. The pitted terrain at the brickworks was useful to Grumman in the 1970s for studying the digital mapping of Earth.

The name Bethpage also features prominently as the name of the school district in a map of 1873.

In 1932, under the auspices of Long Island State Parks Commissioner, Robert Moses, Bethpage State Park, was opened. The 1,400-acre (5.7 km^{2}) park was built on the former estate of railroad tycoon Benjamin Franklin Yoakum, and is located almost entirely within modern Old Bethpage. In 1936, the adjacent hamlet of Central Park petitioned the post office to change its name to Bethpage. Since there were only fifty residents in the school district then named Bethpage, the post office suggested that the two communities merge and granted the request. Residents of the then-Bethpage, resisting the merger suggestion, changed the name of their school district to Old Bethpage. Residents also began using Old Bethpage as their postal address, though, there being no such post office until 1965, mail addressed to Old Bethpage was handled by the Plainview post office. As of 2026, Old Bethpage and Plainview continue to have joint school, library, fire, and water districts. There was no movement to rename Bethpage State Park, and so some mistakenly believe it is located mostly in Bethpage.

Old Bethpage is home to the Old Bethpage Village Restoration, opened in 1963, on a former Powell family farm. The restoration is an authentic recreation of a pre-Civil War, Long Island farming village, complete with original mid-19th-century structures moved from various areas of the island, including farmhouses, a blacksmith, general store, cobbler, schoolhouse (1845), and church. Costumed staff demonstrate crafts from that period.
