= Bethpage Branch =

Former Long Island Rail Road branch

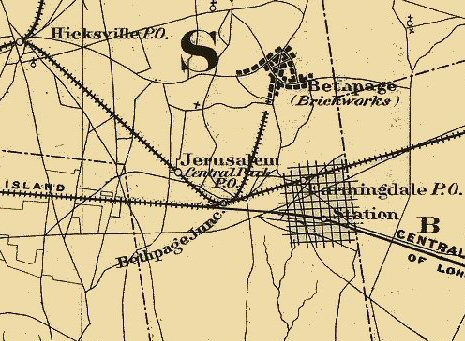
- Map of the Bethpage Branch from 1873

Overview
- Status: Abandoned
- Locale: Bethpage Purchase
- Termini: Bethpage (south); Old Bethpage (north)
- Stations: 2

Service
- Type: Passenger and Freight
- Operator(s): Central Railroad of Long Island (1873-1876); Long Island Rail Road (1876-1942)

History
- Opened: June 1873
- Closed: November 10, 1942

Technical
- Line length: 1.75 miles (2.8 km)
- Track gauge: 4 ft 8 1/2 in (1,435 mm)

The Bethpage Branch was a branch of the Long Island Rail Road (LIRR), running from the present-day split between the Ronkonkoma Branch and Central Branch (then called the Bethpage Junction and now called Bethpage Interlocking) north about 1 3/4 miles (2.8 km) to present-day Old Bethpage, New York.

== History ==
This branch was originally built by the Central Railroad of Long Island (CRRLI) in June 1873, primarily for the purpose of serving Alexander Turney Stewart's local brick manufacturing plant (Bethpage Brickworks), so he could deliver bricks for his project building the planned community of Garden City, New York. Several pickle factories near the brickyards also used the line to deliver their freight.

Though passenger usage was not part of the original plan, one passenger stop at each end of the branch was instituted. The passenger stop at the northern terminus of the branch was called Bethpage, located near present-day Winding Road and Battle Row (just north of the old Stewart brickworks, and south of the present-day Old Bethpage Village Restoration). The stop at the southern end, called Bethpage Junction, was also a transfer point. From Bethpage Junction CRRLI (replaced after 1876 by LIRR) trains went north to Bethpage, and southeast to Babylon and beyond. CRRLI (and later LIRR) trains went west towards Garden City (and beyond), while LIRR trains went west to Jamaica (and beyond), and east towards Ronkonkoma (and beyond).

Proposals to extend the branch north through Huntington, Smithtown, and Port Jefferson were abandoned after amalgamation of the CRRLI with the LIRR in 1876. Designated a siding as of May 24, 1909, the Bethpage Branch was abandoned on November 10, 1942. Today, the former right-of-way in part is occupied by a bridle path and Thomas Powell Boulevard.

== Stations ==
Station	Date opened	Date closed	Miles to Penn Station	Notes / history
Bethpage Junction	June 1873	1925		Located at the current LIRR Bethpage Interlocking (between the present-day Bethpage and Farmingdale stations); Also a transfer point, originally between LIRR and CRRLI
Bethpage	November 9, 1874	1909		Located near Winding Road and Battle Row in present-day Old Bethpage; Summer service only in 1876-1877
