= Central Railroad of Long Island =

Former railroad on Long Island, New York

- Map of the Central Railroad of Long Island, with branches to Hempstead and Bethpage
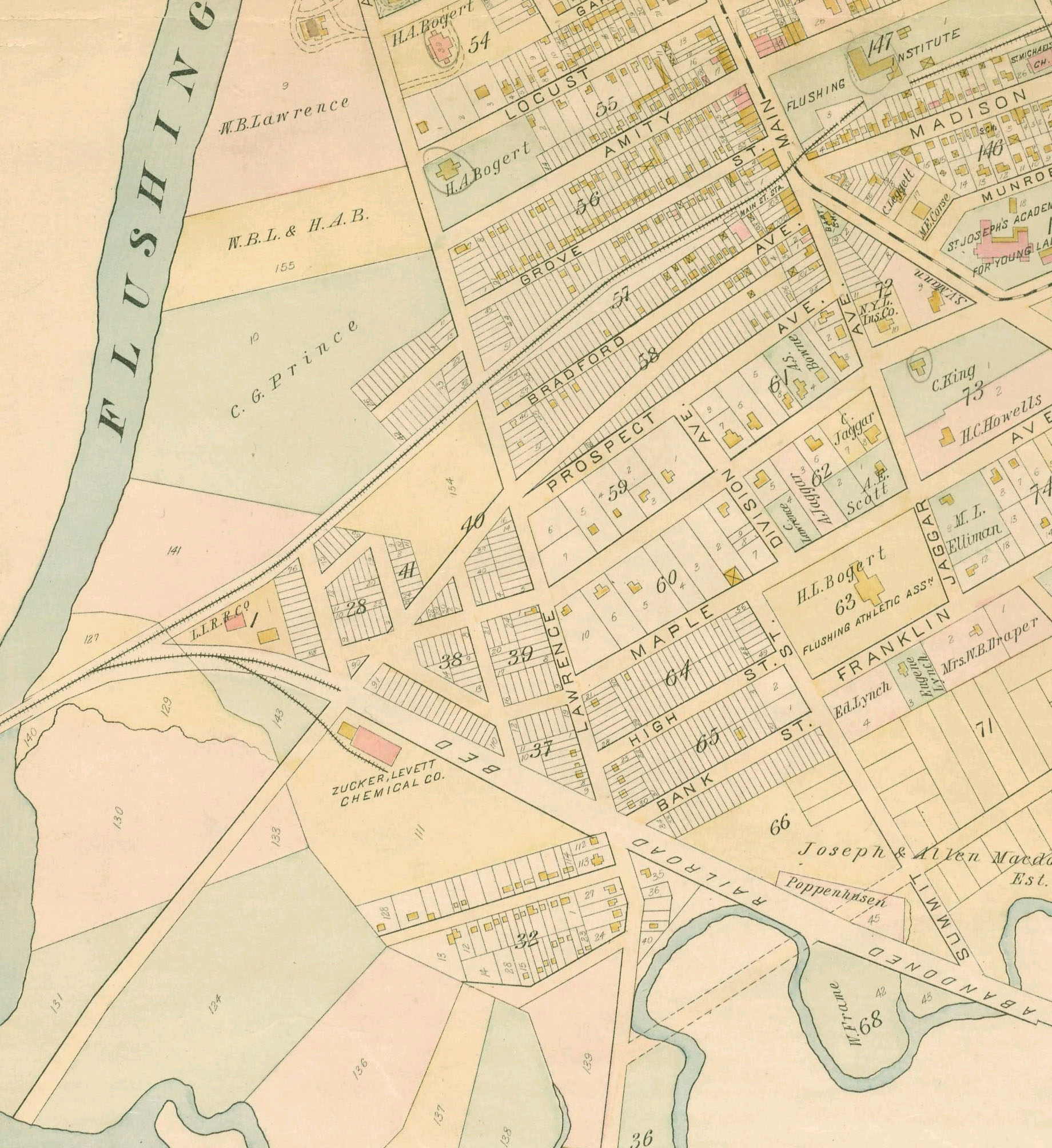
- Great Neck Junction in 1891.

Overview
- Headquarters: Garden City, New York
- Locale: Queens County, N.Y., and Suffolk County, N.Y., U.S.
- Dates of operation: 1871–1874
- Successor: Flushing, North Shore and Central Railroad (1874-1876); Long Island Rail Road (1876-present)

Central Railroad of Long Island was built on Long Island, New York, by Alexander Turney Stewart, who was also the founder of Garden City. The railroad was established in 1871, then merged with the Flushing and North Side Railroad in 1874 to form the Flushing, North Shore and Central Railroad. It was finally acquired by the Long Island Rail Road in 1876 and divided into separate branches. Despite its short existence, the CRRLI had a major impact on railroading and development on Long Island.

Two disconnected segments of the railroad remain in use. The western segment is now used as part of the Hempstead Branch and the Garden City–Mitchel Field Secondary. The eastern segment is now the Central Branch.

== History ==
=== Foundation ===
Alexander Turney Stewart was a wealthy Irish-born entrepreneur, who had made a fortune in retail and real estate. In the spring of 1869, once Stewart heard of the proposed sale of land in the Town of Hempstead, formed the idea which became the Central Railroad of Long Island. On July 17, 1869, at a town referendum on the sale of land, Stewart gave a bid of $55 per acre, and his bid was accepted. Stewart offered President of the LIRR, Oliver Charlick, to operate his railroad, but Charlick declined. In January 1870, Stewart sent a surveyor to lay out three possible options for his proposed railroad west of New Hyde Park Road to Farmingdale Village. Stewart chose the option of a line to Flushing, over an option to Jamaica, and one south of Jamaica. This decision was probably a result of a meeting with Conrad Poppenhusen, who offered to sell Stewart the old New York & Flushing route between Main Street and Woodside. On December 3, 1870, a contract was awarded for the building of Stewart's railroad to Patrick Shields. The line would be double tracked, and would be completed on July 4, 1872. The text of the agreement was published in January 1871, and the Stewart railroad was named the Central Railroad of Long Island.

The Poppenhusens agreed to double-track their existing line to Hunter's Point. The contract gave every person who moved to Garden City or Hempstead a free ticket over the road for one year. Also, the operation of the CRR would be assumed by the Flushing & North Side management, and at least fifteen trains would be run each way every day. On March 4, 1871, it was decided that the Central Railroad would diverge from the Flushing & North Side Railroad east of the drawbridge at Main Street at Great Neck Junction in downtown Flushing, and it would cross south of Flushing, going through Kissena Park, and southeast through Floral Park and New Hyde Park. In May 1871, work began at Rocky Hill on an open cut. In August 1871, a switch was built connecting the LIRR and the Flushing & North Side at Winfield to allow rails and other materials to be transported to the Central Railroad more quickly.

The Central Railroad was built with high standards; it was built with almost no grade crossings, even though it went through rural country. As a result of the need to cross roads, the railroad had to go above or below the grade of the roads, adding to construction costs. The cost of the bridging and tunneling was $110,000. Along the line, two iron bridges were built over Ireland Mill Creek, which drained Kissena Lake, as well as twenty culverts. Steel rails were shipping to Garden City on the Central Railroad at the end of July 1871, when the Long Island Rail Road started shipping them from the docks at Hunter's Point. The rails were distributed and the ties were laid out in August, and the first rail on the plains segment was laid on October 20, near the LIRR crossing, and at two other points eastward. The laying of the track was done rapidly in order not to incur a fine of $250 per day. Three of the nine miles had been laid by December 23. On December 12, the Lawrence Street tunnel, located in Flushing, was finished.

During the winter of 1871–1872, Stewart and Poppenhusen decided to extend the CRRLI southeast from Farmingdale to Babylon, and then to Fire Island. In order to build this, the Central Extension Railroad Company, a subsidiary, was created in 1871. In January 1872, the map of the Babylon Extension was released, with the route crossing pine barrens in a straight line to West Babylon, where it crossed the tracks of the South Side Railroad and went to terminate at the dock of Babylon, where boats left for Fire Island. The contract was given to Thomas Wellwood & Company for $20,000 for every mile of track built. In March 1872, all of the grading for the railroad was complete. On March 22, 1872, the extensive cut at Rocky Hill was completed, and bridges were ready to be installed throughout Queens. The grading for the work on the Babylon extension finished in March 1872. In April and May 1872, track was laid quickly, with only five miles of track left to be laid at the end of May. In May 1872, the Bethpage Branch was surveyed to cross the LIRR main line west of Farmingdale. In June, the stations at Hinsdale and Creedmoor were completed, and in October the engine house at Hempstead was finished. In June, the Bethpage Branch was completed.

On June 24, 1872, a construction train made the first trip over the railroad from Flushing to Garden City, testing out the route, and on July 13, 1872, the train made it to Farmingdale. In July, the last pieces of land were bought to finish the acquisition of property for the right-of-way to Hempstead. On September 10, 1872, the last track was laid to finish the line into Hempstead. The Central RR was confident with immediate operation of the line and issued the first timetable in August, announcing trains as of September 1; this was moved back to September 16, and called for eight daily trains each way between Hunter's Point and Hempstead. Some defects in the construction of the bridges held back the opening of the line. The line from Flushing east to Hempstead Crossing along with a branch line to Hempstead opened at 6:30 a.m. on January 8, 1873, and throughout the opening day, the ridership of the train increased. The stations of Central Junction, Creedmoor, Hinsdale, Garden City, and Hempstead opened on the line's opening day, and nine trains were run per day. On May 26, 1873, the line opened to Bethpage Junction, giving Farmingdale seven trains per day.

On August 1, service was extended to Merrick Road, with seven trains each way per day. A temporary depot was put into use at the southeast corner of Merrick Road and East Neck Road. For Fire Island, passengers transferred to a boat to Fire Island. Terminating at Merrick Road was meant to be temporary. The depot at Babylon was completed on October 18, 1873. The depot tracks were connected with the horse car tracks on Fire Island Avenue in June 1874, which allowed the horse railroad baggage car to run alongside the baggage cars of the Central.

On July 20, 1874, the CRRLI along with other subsidiary railroads of the Flushing & North Side Railroad were merged to form the Flushing, North Side, and Central Railroad. In September 1874, the CRRLI also purchased the Southern Railroad of Long Island (SRRLI). Just before Stewart's death in 1876, a financial backer of the CRRLI, rubber baron Conrad Poppenhusen, bought a majority share of the LIRR, with each of the newer railways leased to the LIRR. Declaring bankruptcy in 1877, the LIRR was placed in receivership that October. Austin Corbin bought possession of the system in 1881, and consolidated all the railroads on Long Island under the LIRR, forming the railroads intricate system of rail lines. In consolidating the lines the CRRLI would be fragmented into several branch lines that throughout the 1900s would serve the LIRR in a number of different ways. In 1893, the LIRR bought out all remaining claims to the Stewart Line from Flushing to Bethpage Junction.

=== Creedmoor Branch ===
After the takeover by the LIRR, the CRRLI mainline from Flushing through Floral Park (then called Hinsdale) was deemed redundant and no longer needed, mainly because the rest of the Central mainline east of Floral Park was to be connected to the LIRR's mainline at the location of the newly built Park Interlocking (today the connection is at Queens Interlocking). This connection afforded the Central access to Long Island City through the LIRR's major hub, Jamaica station. This right of way between Flushing and the National Rifle Range, later to become Creedmoor Psychiatric Hospital, was abandoned in 1879; the track was removed sometime before December 1913. The Central between Floral Park and Babylon was placed into service as the LIRR's Central Branch. What was left between Floral Park and Creedmoor was deemed the Creedmoor Branch by the LIRR.

For a few years, the Creedmoor branch served passengers traveling to the National Rifle Range, which predated the Creedmoor Psychiatric Hospital. The branch was poorly situated, however, in that it had no direct connection to Jamaica station. Passengers traveling east from Jamaica to Creedmoor had to change at Floral Park then backtrack on a shuttle train to Creedmoor. Eventually the branch was downgraded to a secondary track and was mostly used throughout the 20th century as a freight branch for Creedmoor Hospital with daily coal deliveries. Even so, the branch was important enough for the LIRR to undertake several grade crossing elimination projects along the line, most notably with the construction of a large steel trestle, built in the 1930s, to take the branch over Jamaica Avenue/Jericho Turnpike. The line was used for this nominal service until the late 1960s when finally it was put out of service. The tracks were pulled up around 1973 with the trestle over Jamaica Avenue/Jericho Turnpike being dismantled in 1980. The right of way was absorbed by many of the homeowners who were given an opportunity to buy the land that adjoined their properties.

In 1912, William Kissam Vanderbilt II used the Central Rail Road bridge over Bell Boulevard as part of the Long Island Motor Parkway right of way. This caused the parkway to curve slightly south for the crossing. New York State Parks Department later built the current bridge over Bell Boulevard just north of the original site when they acquired the land for a bicycle path in 1938. The original Rail Road right of way leading to the bridge can still be seen when headed east immediately prior to the current crossing.

In 1949, the track was torn up between Hillside Avenue and Winchester Boulevard for a garden apartment development, and in 1955–1956, houses were built on the right-of-way for two or three blocks east of Winchester Boulevard.

By the late 20th century there were few remains of the branch. Much of the Kissena Park corridor was built on former railroad property. The right-of-way also passes through Cunningham Park and Flushing Meadow Park. The right-of-way in Queens Village and Floral Park was sold for private home backyards. A section of rail that had been paved over still exists on the Creedmoor property. Stewart Avenue and the uniquely angled street pattern in the Bellerose and Queens Village area of Queens, which was built around the branch near Winchester Boulevard, still mark the path of the right of way. In addition, a section of the right-of-way near Jericho Turnpike and Tulip Avenue is an all-handicapped parking space for Floral Park station that requires either a daily fee or a Village of Floral Park Resident/Non-Residential permit.

=== Hempstead branches ===
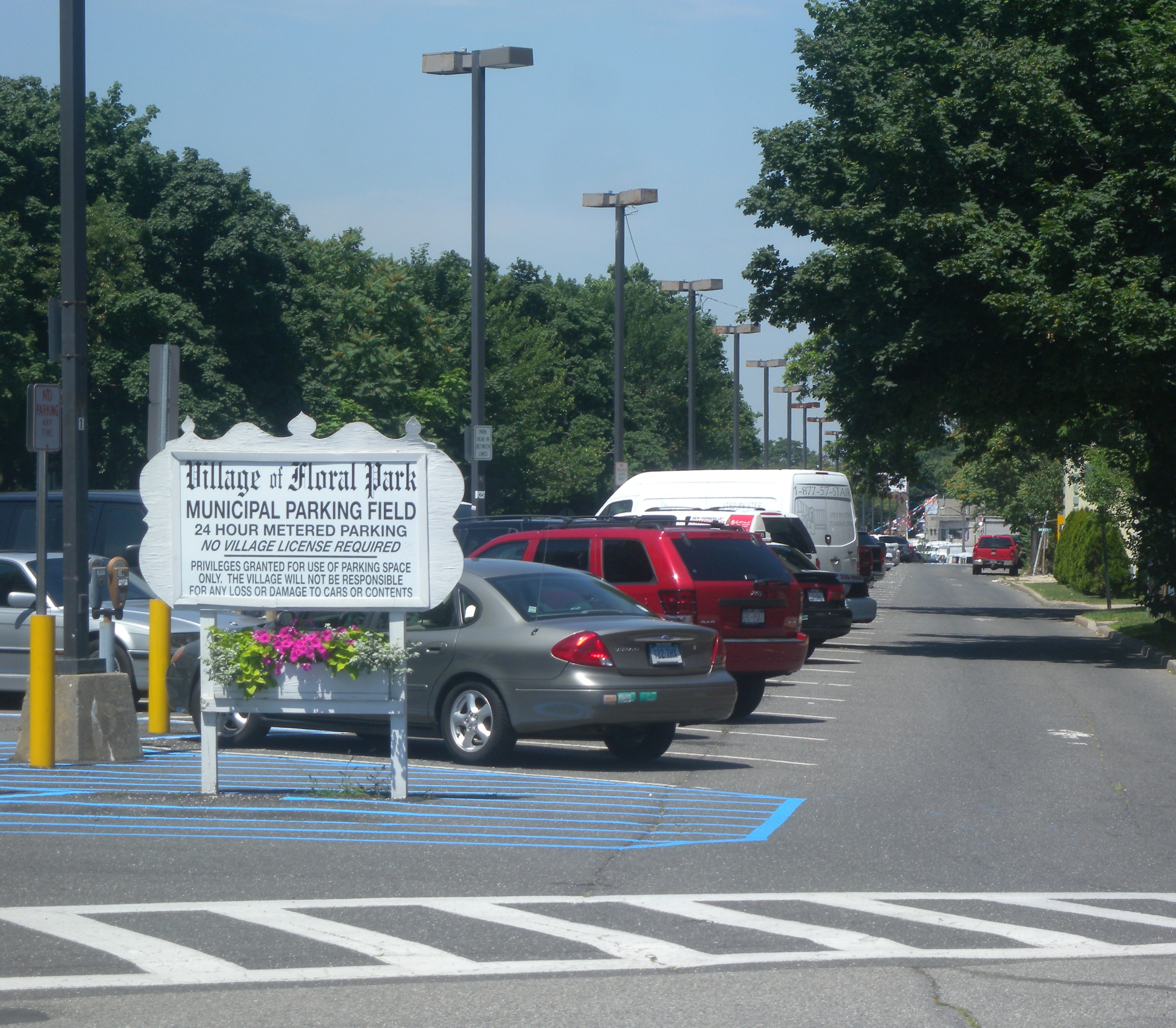
Right of way in Floral Park, now a municipal parking lot

The segment that became the Hempstead Branch includes part of the CRRLI from Floral Park, New York to Garden City, New York, and part of the original Hempstead Branch which ran south of the LIRR Main Line ran from Mineola, ending just west of the current terminal in Hempstead. It opened on July 4, 1839, as the first branch of the LIRR. The main line was extended east from Hempstead Crossing opened May 26, 1873. The Central Railroad's successor, the FNS&C, was leased to the LIRR on May 3, 1876, and in June a connection at Hempstead Crossing was built, allowing trains from Mineola to use the ex-Central's Hempstead Branch, which ran parallel to the LIRR's Hempstead Branch track south of the Central. The original LIRR Hempstead Branch was abandoned south of Hempstead Crossing.

The old Central main line through Hempstead was named the Central Branch by the LIRR, while the line from Mineola on the LIRR's Main Line south past Hempstead Crossing to Hempstead was the Hempstead Branch. The New York Bay Extension Railroad opened the current West Hempstead Branch in 1893, resulting in a realignment of the Hempstead Branch back to the LIRR's original Hempstead Branch from Hempstead Crossing south to Meadow Street to better connect to the new line. The former CRRLI's Hempstead Branch that ran parallel track was abandoned in 1907.

The current route of the Hempstead Branch, from Queens Village east along the Main Line and Central Branch and south along the Hempstead Branch to Hempstead, was electrified on May 26, 1908. The then-Hempstead Branch north to Mineola was electrified on October 20, 1926, along with the West Hempstead Branch. The line north of Hempstead Crossing last saw passenger service on September 14, 1935, and was abandoned for freight in 1965. This meant that all Hempstead Branch trains now left the main line at Queens Village, and at some point the old Central Branch west of Hempstead Crossing was renamed as part of the Hempstead Branch.

=== Garden City–Mitchel Field Secondary ===
The CRRLI mainline continued past Garden City through the vast open Hempstead Plains in central Nassau County at the location of the current day Nassau Coliseum, and on through what is today Eisenhower Park until Bethpage Junction. From there, one branch, the Bethpage Branch, turned north to Stewart's brickworks in present-day Old Bethpage. A second branch turned south-east to Babylon via the Babylon extension. The only areas of this CRRLI line that were very populated were around Hempstead and Babylon, and low ridership led to financial difficulties and a reduction in service. A bright spot for this Stewart line came in 1918 when Mitchel Field, an Air Force base, opened up in the Hempstead Plains. After the war ended, passenger usage again declined, but the line continued to be used for freight from Mitchel Field along with the other industries that opened up around the field.

In 1925 the Montauk Branch along southern Long Island between Jamaica and Babylon was electrified, providing more efficient and faster service to Babylon, thus further hurting ridership on the Stewart line. Also in 1925, the connection with Babylon was severed when the Bethpage Junction was reconfigured to connect the Main Line with the Montauk Branch. The Babylon Extension was fully rebuilt and became known as the current-day LIRR Central Branch. The portion of the line from Garden City to Plainedge/Bethpage came to be referred to as the Central Extension.

In 1939 the Central Extension between Garden City and the end of line in Bethpage was abandoned for regular passenger service. During World War II, the eastern portion of the rail was removed and sold for scrap. For a while the LIRR ran a shuttle service between Garden City and Island Trees/Plainedge area (the right of way past Plainedge to Bethpage Junction was not rebuilt) for both the Levitt construction and to service Mitchel Field.

In 1946, in order to bring building materials to the huge new Levittown development, the rails were relaid eastward just east of the Wantagh Parkway, where a temporary freight terminal was set up. The track crossed the parkway at grade and trains were flagged across. However, by the early 1950s the Levitt construction gradually came to an end and Mitchel Field began to gradually curtail its operations as the surrounding areas began their suburban development. The LIRR had initially wanted to rebuild the entire branch to serve the new community of Levittown, however, Levitt did not want the railroad running through the town. Shuttle service to Plainedge thus ended in 1953 with the rails being pulled up again to just west of the Meadowbrook Parkway. The opening of the Meadowbrook Parkway and the laying out of Salisbury Park by the county in the late 1950s further cut the track back to the present Roosevelt Raceway terminus. A line of high tension wires still marks the old right-of-way all the way to Bethpage. In 1961, passenger service on the Central Extension was abandoned, when the Roosevelt Raceway Specials were taken away because of the refusal of the Raceway officials to contribute to the cost of the service.

The LIRR continued to use the line in its freight service, officially giving the line its current name the Garden City-Mitchell Field Secondary. A large freight yard remained in Garden City servicing some local industries such as A&P, the General Bronze Corporation, and Newsday. Many plans were developed by the LIRR during the fifties and sixties to use the remaining portion of trackage and build a "Nassau Hub" that would service the many new retail outfits that sprung up in the area such as Roosevelt Field Mall, as well as the newly built Nassau Coliseum, and Nassau Community College, which was built on part of the Mitchel Field site. However, lack of resources (at the time the bankrupt LIRR was in the process of being bought by the MTA from the Pennsylvania Railroad), as well as community opposition from residents in Garden City shelved those plans. As the years went on the remaining freight customers along the line also disappeared.

In 1997 the LIRR decided to privatize its freight services by contracting them out to a newly developed short line the New York and Atlantic Railway (NYAR), however, NYAR has no customers using the line. Today the line is primarily used for the Ringling Brothers Barnum and Bailey Circus train, which uses the secondary and the Garden City yard to store its trains when the circus makes its yearly visit to Nassau Veterans Memorial Coliseum. During the rest of the year, the line remains rather dormant except for a couple of equipment moves by the LIRR.

Today the right of way east of Meadowbrook Parkway can still plainly been seen as the Long Island Power Authority has lined the right of way with utility poles. The Meadow Brook Club Road Bridge still nestles inside an entrance ramp of the parkway. Part of the embankment of the old R.O.W. east of Eisenhower Park can also still be seen. The Clinton Road station and its low level platforms still exists along the R.O.W of the secondary with the station house being used for the Garden City Fire Department. In recent years there have been calls to reactivate passenger service on the remaining portion of the line to serve as part of the formerly proposed Nassau Hub which would service the area around Nassau Coliseum, Nassau Community College, and the Roosevelt Field and Fortunoff shopping malls.

The Long Island Motor Parkway ran mostly parallel north of this line in the section east of Meadowbrook Parkway, and the land there is presently a right-of way for Long Island Power Authority lines.

=== Bethpage Branch ===
The Bethpage Branch was the source of construction of Garden City, New York. The line was originally built by the CRRLI in June 1873, primarily for the purpose of serving Stewart's local brick manufacturing plant, known as Bethpage Brickworks, and also served a pickle factory. It ran north from a station at the present-day split between the Ronkonkoma Branch and Central Branch (then called the Bethpage Junction and now called Bethpage Interlocking) to a station then called Bethpage. The branch became part of the LIRR, when it bought the CRRLI. Designated a siding as of May 24, 1909, it was abandoned on November 10, 1942. Since 1963, the former Bethpage Branch and station has been located within the Old Bethpage Village Restoration in what is now called Old Bethpage.

=== Central Branch ===
The remaining segment of the Central Branch is now owned and operated by the Long Island Rail Road. It connects the Main Line's Ronkonkoma Branch at BETH Interlocking southeast of the Bethpage station with the Montauk and Babylon Branches at Belmont Junction west of the Babylon station. This allows several Montauk Branch trains that begin or end east of Babylon to use the Main Line from Bethpage to Jamaica. The branch is colored as part of the Ronkonkoma Branch on some LIRR maps, but these trains are shown on Babylon and Montauk Branch timetables.

Much of the line runs parallel to New York State Route 109. The last station that existed along this branch of track was South Farmingdale Station. A sheltered platform existed there as recently as 1974, when the station was discontinued.

Several freight customers are located along the branch, which is served several times weekly by the New York & Atlantic Railway.

== List of stations ==
=== Main Line ===
Station/ location	Station link	Miles (kilometers) to Penn Station	Current Connections/notes	History
Great Neck Junction			Also known as Central Junction. Shared by the Main Line of the Flushing and North Side Railroad (now the Port Washington Branch of the LIRR), and Central RR of Long Island.	Opened July 1873, and abandoned April 30, 1879. Located west of Flushing–Main Street station near Whitestone Expressway
Hillside				Opened April 1874; Abandoned April 30, 1879
Kissena			Listed on some timetables as Kissena-Flushing, Flushing-Kissena, or Kissena Park.	Opened June 1873–August 1876. Re-opened June 1877, and abandoned on April 30, 1879. Moved to a private location, but burned on May 8, 1918.
Frankiston			On Black Stump Road, now called 73rd Avenue, east of Clearview Expressway. Now part of Cunningham Park.	Opened June 1873. Origin of the name is unknown. Loomis L. White, the railroad's second largest stockholder, bought all the land surrounding the station in April 1871. The station's building was built by E.W. Karker & Co. of College Point, April–May 1873. The station was first included in railroad timetables in June 1873. Closed and abandoned on April 30, 1879.
Creedmoor			Listed on some timetables as National Rifle Range. Served the Creedmoor Rifle Range.	Opened January 8, 1873.
Hinsdale			Also a former name of nearby Floral Park Station.	Opened January 8, 1873; Closed April 30, 1879. Moved to a private location in April 1883.
Connection from to Main Line from Creedmoor Wye, and Hempstead Branch from bridge over Main Line
Floral Park; Tulip Avenue and Atlantic Avenue, Floral Park		16.9		
Spur to Floral Park station, Bridge between Creedmoor Branch and Hempstead Branch
Hyde Park; New Hyde Park Road and Manor Road, Garden City		18.3	Bus (Nassau Inter-County Express): N25	Opened in 1873, later renamed Hyde Park Central. Reopened in 1909 as Stewart Manor.
Nassau Boulevard; Nassau Boulevard and South Avenue, Garden City		19.3		Opened in 1907, 41 years after the death of Stewart.
Garden City; 7th Street between Hilton and Cathedral Avenues, Garden City		20.4	Bus (Nassau Inter-County Express): N40, N41	
Hempstead Crossing had connections from Hempstead Branch, West Hempstead Branch, and Oyster Bay Branch; Garden City Secondary begins
Washington Street				Opened in 1923 with low platforms in service for LIRR's shuttle service with battery cars.
Clinton Road			Now a firehouse, owned by the Garden City Fire Department.	Originally built in 1915, and used as a ticket office for Camp Mills in World War One. Closed on May 15, 1953.
Newsday			Built for the original headquarters of Newsday.	Opened June 1949, closed May 15, 1953
A&P Bronze				Built around 1928 for the A&P Warehouse as A&P Station. Combined with General Bronze Corporation station in 1949. Closed May 15, 1953.
General Bronze				Built in 1949 for the General Bronze Corporation. Combined with A&P Warehouse. Closed May 15, 1953.
Mitchel Field			Wooden shelter for Mitchel Air Force Base	Originally Camp Black in 1896, then Aviation Field Number 2; Closed May 15, 1953.
Meadowbrook-Roosevelt Raceway			Built to serve Roosevelt Raceway in Westbury.	Opened 1939, Closed 1961.
Meadowbrook				Opened 1873, Closed 1939.
Newbridge Road				
Central Avenue				
Salisbury Plains				Wooden shelter shed built c. 1916. Used to store lumber during construction of 2nd Depot, which was opened on December 10, 1923. Closed approximately in 1940. Depot privately owned, then razed sometime in the 1990s.
Island Trees				
Central Park/ Jerusalem/ Plainedge			Stop located at east side of Stewart Avenue in Plainedge, New York, about 0.75 miles south of present Bethpage station.	First listed on the timetable of May 1873, and last listed on CRRLI table in October 1876. Agent used one of the rooms in his own house for a public waiting room. Side track was installed for freight cars in January 1874. Shows as "Plainedge" in 1942 employee timetables.
Bethpage Junction			A transfer point between LIRR and CRRLI at current LIRR BETH Interlocking site, east of which the Bethpage Branch headed north.	First listed on timetable in June 1873; abandoned by CRRLI October 1, 1877. Appears on 1924 LIRR schedule for Central Extension. Reconfigured in 1925. No known depot building.
Connections to Main Line (Ronkonkoma Branch) and Bethpage Branch; Existing "Central Branch" begins
South Farmingdale				Opened as "Farmingdale Station" in May 1873; Closed in either March 1875 or June 1876. Reopened again by LIRR in June 1936; Closed 1974.
Maywood			Roughly in the vicinity of the NY 109–NY 110 interchange today.	
Breslau			East of Wellwood Ave, North Lindenhurst, NY	Breslau was also a former name for Lindenhurst on what is today the Babylon Branch of the Long Island Rail Road. LIRR may have had a stop here after 1925 called "North Lindenhurst".
Belmont Junction				
Babylon			Bus (Suffolk County Transit): S20, S23, S25, S27, S29, S40, S42, S47; Bus (Trailways Transportation System): Adirondack Trailways, Pine Hills Trailways	Built on October 28, 1867, by the SSRRLI as Seaside Station. Renamed Babylon Station two years later and still exists today.
Babylon				at Fire Island Avenue. Mostly unused after CRRLI acquired SSRRLI just 11 months after station opened

=== Defunct Bethpage Branch ===
Station/location	Station link	Miles to Penn Station	Current Connections/notes	History
Bethpage Junction				See: "Existing Central Branch"
Bethpage			Passenger stop appears to have been at Winding Road and Battle Row (just north of old Stewart brickworks) in present-day Old Bethpage, New York. Northern terminus of Bethpage Branch.	Passenger service opened as an accommodation to farmers November 9, 1874, with one round-trip a day. During 1876 and 1877, summer service only was provided. No evidence any station was ever built.
