= Central extension =

Central extension may refer to:

- Central Extension (Long Island Rail Road), a rail line
- Central extension (mathematics), a type of group extension
