= Central Branch (Long Island Rail Road) =

Long Island Rail Road branch

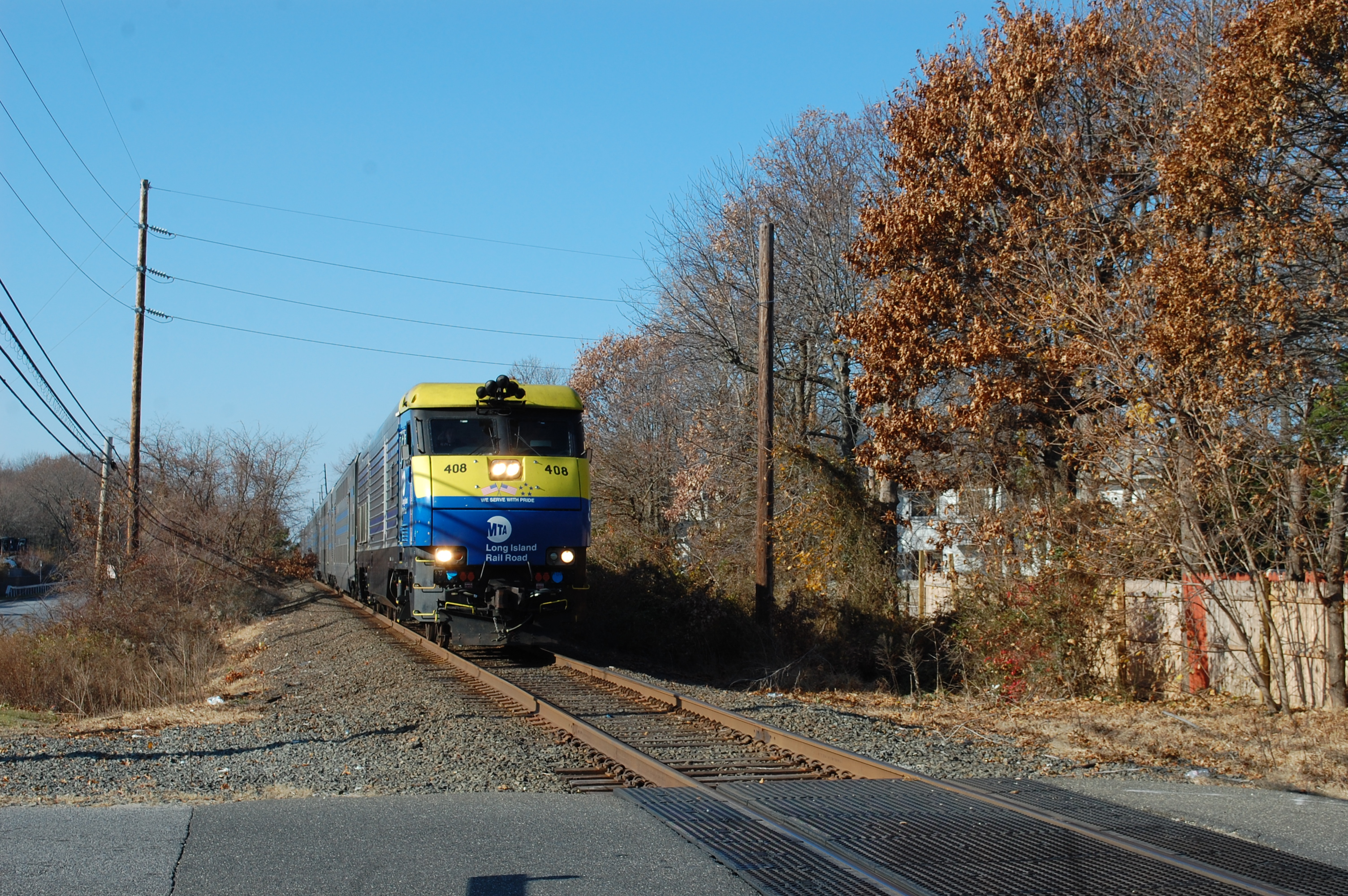
- LIRR #408 (EMD DE30AC) leads an eastbound service on the Central Branch in West Babylon in 2012.

Overview
- Status: Operational
- Owner: Long Island Rail Road
- Locale: Long Island, New York, USA
- Termini: Bethpage; Babylon
- Stations: 0 (2 former)

Service
- Type: Commuter and freight rail
- System: Long Island Rail Road
- Services: Montauk Branch
- Operator(s): Metropolitan Transportation Authority (passenger); New York and Atlantic Railway (freight)

History
- Opened: 1873 (as part of the Central Railroad of Long Island)

Technical
- Line length: 7 miles (11 km)
- Number of tracks: 1
- Track gauge: 4 ft 8 1/2 in (1,435 mm) standard gauge
- Electrification: None

The Central Branch is a rail line owned and operated by the Long Island Rail Road (LIRR) in the U.S. state of New York, extending from BETH Interlocking (40.734°N 73.470°W) just east of Bethpage station to Belmont Junction (40.696°N 73.341°W) just west of Babylon station. It was built in 1873 as part of the Babylon Extension of the Central Railroad of Long Island (CRRLI), which was owned by Alexander Turney Stewart. The branch was mostly unused following the 1876 merger of the CRRLI and the LIRR, but in 1925 it was rebuilt and reconfigured to connect Bethpage and Babylon stations.

== Description ==
The Central Branch connects the Main Line (Ronkonkoma Branch service) at Beth Interlocking southeast of the Bethpage station with the Montauk Branch (Babylon Branch service) at Belmont Junction west of the Babylon station. This allows non-electric Montauk Branch trains that begin or end east of Babylon to use the Main Line from Bethpage to Jamaica.

The branch is colored as part of the Ronkonkoma Branch on some LIRR maps, but these trains appear on Babylon and Montauk Branch timetables. There were two stations along this stretch: Farmingdale (later renamed South Farmingdale) and Breslau. The South Farmingdale station had a sheltered platform and was the last station in service along this branch, discontinued on June 26, 1972. Today, there are several freight customers located along the branch, which is served several times weekly by the New York & Atlantic Railway.

It was along this stretch of the Central Branch that Mile-a-Minute Murphy set a record in 1899, peddling a bicycle for one mile behind a train in less than one minute.

=== Electrification proposals ===
As part of the 2020–2024 MTA Capital Program, the Central Branch was proposed to be electrified with third rail. Officials stated that this would have alleviated service disruptions by allowing electric trains to travel between the Ronkonkoma and Babylon Branches – both of which are electrified. If implemented, this would have been the first LIRR electrification project since the Ronkonkoma Branch was electrified in 1985–1987.

== The Central Railroad of Long Island ==
The current Central Branch right of way dates back to 1873 when Alexander Stewart chartered and built the Central Railroad of Long Island. A line of tracks was built by the CRRLI from Flushing to Bethpage Junction, and later extended to the Babylon shoreline via the aforementioned Babylon Extension. At Garden City a spur line was also built to service residents of Hempstead. At the time, Stewart was building Garden City, one of the first planned suburban communities in the United States. The railroad had a dual purpose in that it was to service Stewart's Bethpage Brickworks (within the hamlet now called Old Bethpage), which was supplying the building materials to the Garden City construction site. The railroad also supplied the new residents of Garden City with both commuter service to Long Island City, where they could then connect to ferries into Manhattan. Service along the Babylon extension also was popular for excursions to the Babylon shoreline and to ferries to Fire Island.

In 1876 the CRRLI was acquired by the LIRR and Stewart's line became known as the LIRR's Central Branch. The portion from Flushing to the Creedmoor Rifle Range, which became Creedmoor State Hospital) was abandoned in 1879, although the tracks were not removed until World War I. The portion from Creedmoor to Floral Park survived as freight service and was known as the Creedmoor Branch until service ended in the late 1960s and the tracks removed from the LIRR map in the early 1970s. The LIRR used the Central's right of way between Floral Park and Garden City along with the Central's spur line to Hempstead to make up what is the railroad's current day Hempstead Branch. Past the Garden City station the Central Branch continued on a straight path through central Nassau County past the Nassau Veterans Memorial Coliseum and Eisenhower Park until Bethpage Junction and then southeast to Babylon via the Babylon Extension.

In 1925 the Stewart's Central branch was severed from its connection to the Babylon extension with the reconfiguration of Bethpage Junction. The portion of the line from Garden City to just west of the disconnection at Bethpage Junction were called the Central Extension. The Babylon Extension was fully rebuilt, also in 1925, with the main purpose of providing a connection between the two main trunk lines of the LIRR, the Main Line and Montauk Branch, and thus became known as the aforementioned Central Branch. In 1939 the Central Extension between Garden City and the end of line in Bethpage was abandoned for regular passenger service. During World War II the eastern portion of the rail was removed and sold for scrap. After World War II a portion of the track was rebuilt to move materials for the construction of Levittown, however, it never again reached Bethpage Junction (thus, nor Babylon), and those tracks too were soon removed.

== See also ==
- Wildcat Branch, a rail line in Massachusetts with a similar function of connecting two different main lines together and allowing longer-distance express trains to overtake local trains
