= Jessica Brungo =

American basketball player (born 1982)

Personal information
- Born: April 16, 1982 (age 44) Plainview, New York, U.S.
- Listed height: 6 ft 1 in (1.85 m)
- Listed weight: 165 lb (75 kg)

Career information
- High school: North Allegheny (Wexford, Pennsylvania)
- College: Penn State (2000–2004)
- WNBA draft: 2004: 2nd round, 16th overall pick
- Drafted by: Connecticut Sun
- Position: Small forward
- Number: 22

Career history
- 2004–2006: Connecticut Sun
- Stats at Basketball Reference

Jessica Kathryn Brungo (born April 16, 1982) is an American women's basketball player formerly with the Connecticut Sun of the Women's National Basketball Association (WNBA). She was selected 16th overall in the 2004 WNBA draft out of Penn State. During her senior season, Jessica helped led her team to the Elite Eight, where they fell to the eventual national champion, Connecticut. During her career at Penn State, she scored 1,143 points, and grabbed 649 rebounds. She played for basketball hall of famer Rene Portland.

She is a graduate of North Allegheny High School in Wexford, Pennsylvania.

== Penn State statistics ==
Legend
GP	Games played	GS	Games started	MPG	Minutes per game
FG%	Field goal percentage	3P%	3-point field goal percentage	FT%	Free throw percentage
RPG	Rebounds per game	APG	Assists per game	SPG	Steals per game
BPG	Blocks per game	PPG	Points per game	**Bold**	Career high

Year	Team	GP	Points	FG%	3P%	FT%	RPG	APG	SPG	BPG	PPG
2000-01	Penn State	29	167	42.0	43.5	71.4	3.0	1.0	0.5	0.2	5.8
2001-02	Penn State	**35**	233	41.9	25.0	81.1	4.1	1.2	0.9	0.7	6.7
2002-03	Penn State	**35**	**400**	**48.8**	**33.6**	80.9	**6.3**	**2.6**	**1.5**	**1.2**	**11.4**
2003-04	Penn State	34	342	38.8	28.9	**83.9**	5.9	1.7	0.9	0.6	10.1
Career	Penn State	133	1142	43.1	32.3	80.4	4.9	1.6	1.0	0.7	8.6

== WNBA career statistics ==
Legend
GP	Games played	GS	Games started	MPG	Minutes per game	RPG	Rebounds per game
APG	Assists per game	SPG	Steals per game	BPG	Blocks per game	PPG	Points per game
TO	Turnovers per game	FG%	Field-goal percentage	3P%	3-point field-goal percentage	FT%	Free-throw percentage
**Bold**	Career best	°	League leader

=== Regular season ===
Year	Team	GP	GS	MPG	FG%	3P%	FT%	RPG	APG	SPG	BPG	TO	PPG
2004	Connecticut	**33**	0	**9.5**	**30.5**	**26.3**	**80.0**	**1.1**	**0.8**	**0.1**	**0.1**	0.4	**1.5**
2005	Connecticut	12	0	4.0	11.1	0.0	0.0	0.5	0.2	0.0	0.0	**0.2**	0.2
2006	Connecticut	4	0	1.8	0.0	0.0	0.0	0.0	0.0	0.0	0.0	0.3	0.0
Career	3 years, 1 team	49	0	7.5	27.9	23.8	80.0	0.9	0.6	0.1	0.1	0.3	1.1
