= South Farmingdale station =

Former train station in New York, US

South Farmingdale
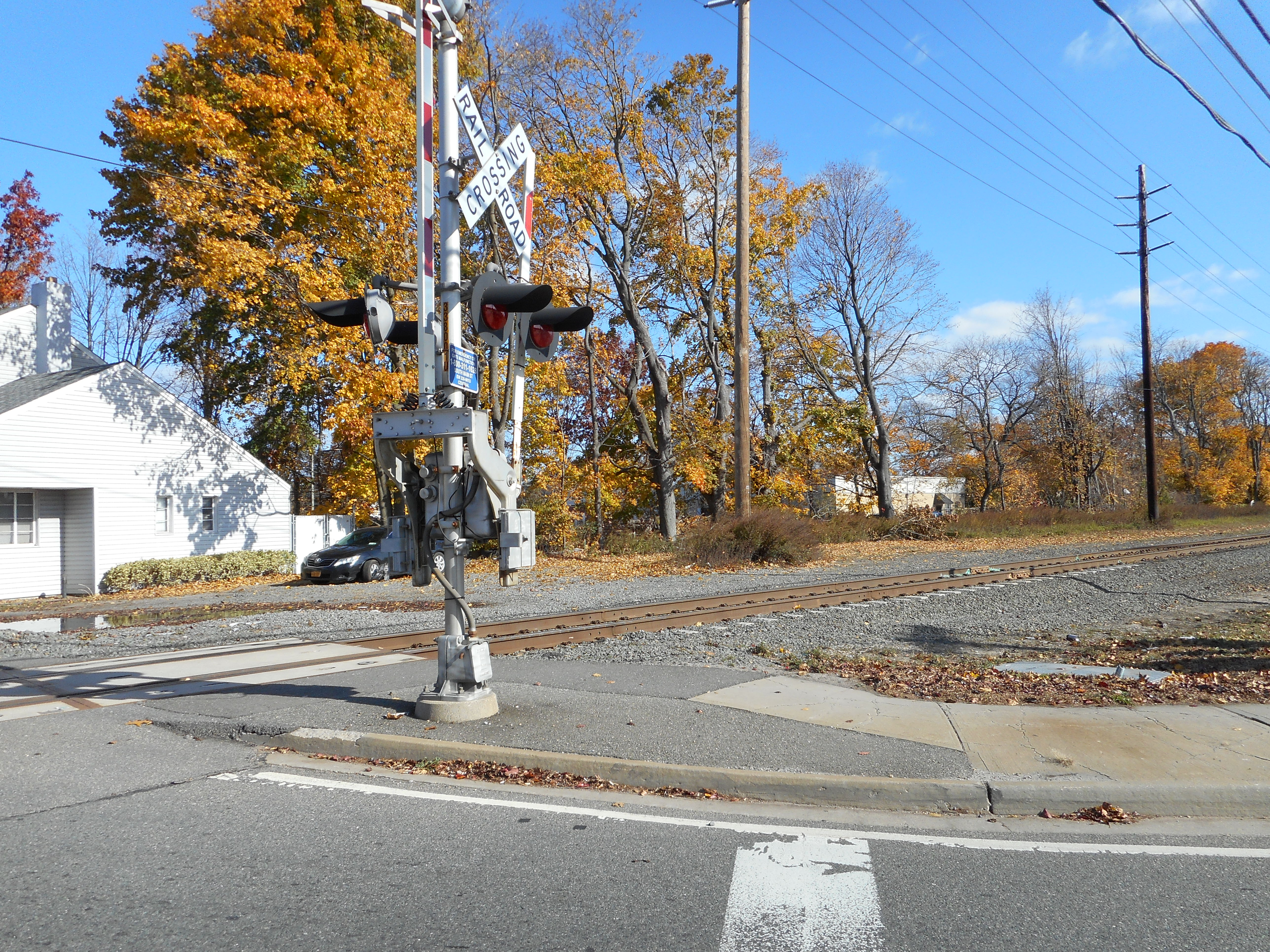
- The site of the former South Farmingdale station.

General information
- Location: Main Street (between Motor; Avenue and NY 109); South Farmingdale, New York
- Coordinates: 40.725934°N 73.443145°W
- Owner: Long Island Rail Road
- Line: Central Branch
- Platforms: 1 side platform
- Tracks: 1

Other information
- Station code: None
- Fare zone: 7

History
- Opened: May 1873; June 1936
- Closed: 1898; June 26, 1972
- Former names: Farmingdale (1873–1876)

Services
Preceding station	Long Island Rail Road	Following station
Bethpage Terminus	Central Branch	Babylon Terminus
Bethpage Terminus	Central Branch	Breslau 19th century toward Babylon
Location

South Farmingdale was a station along the Central Branch of the Long Island Rail Road in South Farmingdale, New York, United States.

== History ==
This station first appeared on timetables of the Central Railroad Extension Company of Long Island (a CRRLI subsidiary) in May 1873, though service may have been delayed a month or two. In 1873, it was named "Farmingdale Station" despite the fact that the LIRR had its own Farmingdale Station. The station depot itself was not built until either August or September 1873, and was located on the east side of Main Street just south of W. C. Dupignac's Hotel. A freight house was erected by the railroad in either April or May 1874 but the station was closed on June 1, 1876. The station was reopened by the Long Island Railroad in June 1936 with a sheltered platform for a stop named "South Farmingdale."

In January 1945, local residents petitioned the Public Service Commission to have some Montauk express trains stop at South Farmingdale. The move was opposed by residents of Bay Shore and Islip who thought that it would make the trains too crowded. The station was closed as a station stop again on June 26, 1972, making it the last station to operate along the Central Branch. The station was closed along with two other stations due to low ridership. The station shelter was removed shortly afterwards.

In 1979, the Long Island Regional Planning Board undertook a study to determine what types of land use changes should be completed along the Route 110 corridor between the Northern State Parkway and Southern State Parkway. The results were published the following year in Industrial Location Analyses–1980. The study recommended reopening the South Farmingdale station but at the intersection of Route 110 and Route 109.
