= Plainview-Old Bethpage Central School District =

School district in the U.S. state of New York

Address
- 106 Washington Avenue Plainview, New York, 11803; United States
- Coordinates: 40°46′42″N 73°27′48″W

District information
- Motto: "Excellence in Education"
- Grades: K–12
- Superintendent: Dr. Mary O’Meara
- Schools: 7
- NCES District ID: 3623220

Students and staff
- Enrollment: 5,016
- Faculty: 550
- District mascot: Hawks
- Colors: Blue, White & Gray

Other information
- Support Staff: 407
- Website: www.pobschools.org

The Plainview-Old Bethpage Central School District (POBCSD) is the public school district which serves the Nassau County, Long Island communities of Plainview and Old Bethpage, as well as small parts of Farmingdale.

== Schools ==
Plainview-Old Bethpage Central School District operates seven schools in seven buildings: there is one high school, two middle schools and four elementary schools.

- Old Bethpage Elementary School (K-4)
- Judy Jacobs-Parkway Elementary School (K-4)
- Pasadena Elementary School (K-4)
- Stratford Road Elementary School (K-4)
- Howard B. Mattlin Middle School (5-8)
- Plainview-Old Bethpage Middle School (5-8)
- Plainview-Old Bethpage John F. Kennedy High School (9-12)

== History ==
The first school in the community was built by Quaker settlers in 1786 adjacent to their meetinghouse on Quaker Meeting House Road in Farmingdale. In 1825, after the State Legislature established local school districts, Plainview (then Manetto Hill) got its first school. During this time, Plainview and Old Bethpage had separate school districts. The building was replaced by a one-room schoolhouse built in 1899 that still stands today next to, and currently owned by the Mid-Island Y-JCC. Although there was only one room, there were two classrooms split by a folding wall; each teacher taught three grades. One teacher taught grades one through three, and one taught grades one through six. Children in grades seven through twelve were sent to nearby schools in Farmingdale and Hicksville. Meanwhile, in Old Bethpage, the first public school building was built in 1825 just north of the current elementary school. It was replaced by the one-room "little red schoolhouse" on Round Swamp and Schoolhouse Roads in 1850. This building was replaced by a two-room schoolhouse in 1916, offering classes from first to sixth grade. Seventh through twelfth graders went to nearby Farmingdale. In 1947, the student population in the building dropped to a mere seven, so the board of trustees of the district closed it down and sent students to Farmingdale. This building was rented in the early 1950s by Plainview's school district and later used as an annex before being sold and demolished to home developers in 1974.

In 1954, Old Bethpage population increased. The student population grew from 25 to over 100. The same year, Farmingdale said it could not handle the student population anymore, so students then went to Bethpage. In May 1956, Bethpage also had to close out students, except for high school students, because of a similar growth rate. The year before, residents of Old Bethpage voted to build a new grade school with a capacity of 660 students. The building opened in 1956.

In 1959, two new Plainview schools opened, and all are still open today: Parkway Elementary School (now named Judy Jacobs-Parkway Elementary School for deceased county legislature Judy Jacobs) and Pasadena Elementary School. Pasadena was closed in 1981 due to low population, but reopened in 2000. In 1960, what was then called Plainview Junior High School opened, costing $3.4 million, and was later changed to Stratford Road Elementary in 1992. In 1961, the Board of Education approved of Howard B. Mattlin Middle School, in honor of former board member Mattlin, who died at age 36 due to cancer.

In 1963 voters approved to build John F. Kennedy High School (now Plainview-Old Bethpage John F. Kennedy High School). The 53-acre site that also includes parts of Mattlin Middle School and Kennedy Drive opened in 1966. The two high schools were merged in 1991 into the Plainview-Old Bethpage John F. Kennedy High School. This new school kept John F. Kennedy High School's colors of blue and white and adapted the mascot of the Hawks to replace its abandoned Eagle mascot and Plainview-Old Bethpage High School's green and yellow Gulls.

In 1996, the district opened its Kindergarten Center. All Kindergarten students attended school here until its closure in 2016. Kindergarten classes were moved into the four elementary schools, citing both decrease in student population and the fact that students were separated from each other at the beginning of first grade until high school.

=== Closed schools ===
- Plainview-Old Bethpage Kindergarten Center (closed in 2016), now merged with Stratford Road Elementary
- Central Park Road School (demolished), now the site of The Residences at Plainview, a senior living community
- Fern Place School (now the Association for Children with Down Syndrome])
- Jamaica Avenue School (now houses Miss Debbie's Creative Childcare, a private child care center, and another daycare, and hosts senior citizens' activities)
- Joyce Road School (now the Hebrew Academy of Nassau County)
- The Little Red School House (demolished)
- Manetto Hill Road School (1899) (now the offices of the Mid-Island Y JCC of Plainview)
- Manetto Hill Road School (1971) (now the main building of the Mid-Island Y JCC of Plainview)
- Oak Drive School (demolished)

== Bibliography ==
1. "Images of America: Plainview-Old Bethpage", by Thomas Carr, published in 2017
