= Plainview, New York =

Populated place in Nassau County, New York, US

- Hamlet and census-designated place
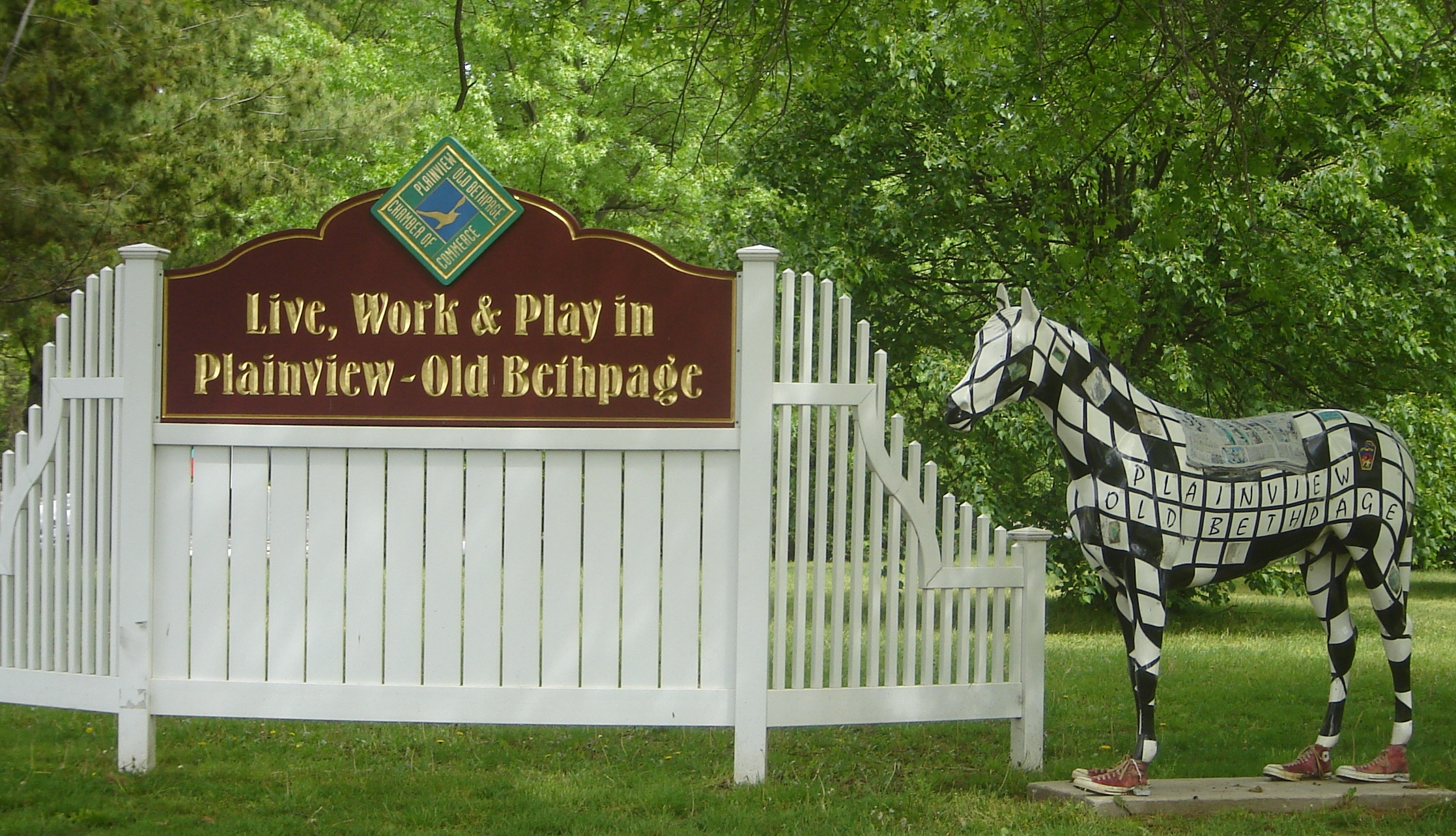

- Location in Nassau County and the state of New York

- Location on Long Island Location within the state of New York
- Coordinates: 40°46′48″N 73°28′46″W
- Country: United States
- State: New York
- County: Nassau
- Town: Oyster Bay
- Named for: The historical view of the Hempstead Plains from the hills in the community

Area
  - Total: 5.73 sq mi (14.85 km^{2})
  - Land: 5.73 sq mi (14.83 km^{2})
  - Water: 0.012 sq mi (0.03 km^{2})
- Elevation: 151 ft (46 m)

Population (2020)
  - Total: 27,100
  - Density: 4,734.4/sq mi (1,827.98/km^{2})
- Time zone: UTC-5 (Eastern (EST))
  - Summer (DST): UTC-4 (EDT)
- ZIP code: 11803
- Area codes: 516, 363
- FIPS code: 36-58442
- GNIS feature ID: 0960664

Plainview is a hamlet and census-designated place (CDP) located in the town of Oyster Bay in east central Nassau County, New York, United States. The population was 27,100 at the time of the 2020 census. The Plainview post office has the ZIP code 11803.

Plainview and its neighboring hamlet, Old Bethpage, share a school system, library, fire department, and water district. Law enforcement for the communities is provided by the Nassau County Police Department's Second and Eighth Precincts.

== History ==
Plainview's origins date to 1648, when Robert Williams, a settler from Wales, bought land in the area. The land was considered desirable for farming because of a small pond named the Moscopas by local Native Americans, meaning "hole of dirt and water". The remainder of the land in the area was purchased by Thomas Powell in 1695 as part of the Bethpage Purchase. The name "Mannatto Hill" had already appeared on the 1695 deed of the Bethpage Purchase, and the settlement came to be called "Manetto Hill". Manitou was the Native American word either for "God" or for "spirit".

The 1837 arrival of the Long Island Rail Road to nearby Hicksville brought a boom to local farming. In 1885, residents of Manetto Hill petitioned the United States Postal Service for a local post office, but were turned down because, according to several accounts, a similar name was already in use upstate. The hamlet was then named "Plainview", for the view of the Hempstead Plains from the top of the Manetto Hills.

Plainview remained a farming community, famous for growing cucumbers for the huge Heinz pickle factories located in nearby Farmingdale and Hicksville. In the early 1900s blight destroyed the cucumber crop and many farmers switched to potatoes. After World War II, a potato blight combined with the desire of many returning GIs to leave New York City for the more rural Long Island, convinced many farmers to sell their property, leading to massive development in the area, giving rise to so-called suburban sprawl. Between 1950 and 1960, the hamlet grew from a population of 1,155 to more than 35,000. Most of the available land was developed during this period or otherwise designated as parkland. While overall development declined it did continue sporadically as smaller remaining parcels of land were also developed. In recent years, some of the few large remaining parcels have given way to gated communities, which are in contrast to most housing in the area. Some of these developments include "The Hamlet on Olde Oyster Bay" and "The Seasons at Plainview", a residential community focused on over age 55 residents and first time home buyers.

On September 21, 2025, the Town of Oyster Bay officially renamed and dedicated the Captain Omer Neutra Memorial Park in honor of Omer Neutra – a 20-year-old Plainview resident murdered by Hamas terrorists in the October 7, 2023 Hamas massacre and attack on Israel.

== Geography ==
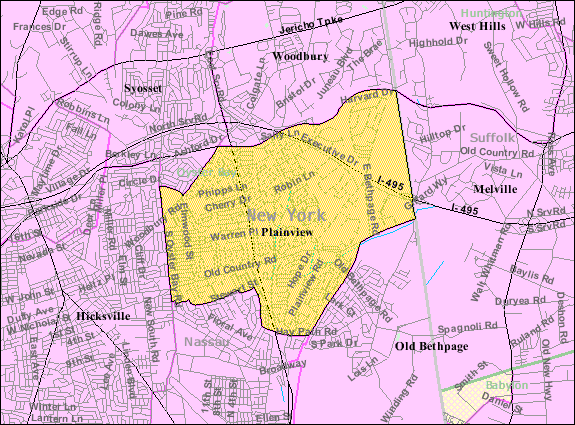
U.S. Census map of Plainview

According to the United States Census Bureau, the CDP has a total area of 5.7 square miles (15 km^{2}) – all but 0.012 square miles (0.031 km^{2}) of which is land.

Plainview is on the Nassau County side of the border with Suffolk County. On the Nassau side, it borders the hamlets of Bethpage, Hicksville, Old Bethpage, Syosset, and Woodbury. On the Suffolk side, its primary border is with Melville, but also touches West Hills.

== Demographics ==
Historical population
Census	Pop.	Note	%±
2000	25,637		—
2010	26,217		2.3%
2020	27,100		3.4%
U.S. Decennial Census

Plainview, like many other places in northern Nassau County has historically had a large Jewish population, and in recent years has exhibited exorbitant growth in its East Asian population that has supplemented the hamlet's established Jewish community.

=== 2020 census ===
As of the 2020 census, Plainview had a population of 27,100. The median age was 44.2 years. 22.9% of residents were under the age of 18 and 20.3% of residents were 65 years of age or older. For every 100 females there were 94.2 males, and for every 100 females age 18 and over there were 91.5 males age 18 and over.

100.0% of residents lived in urban areas, while 0.0% lived in rural areas.

There were 8,861 households in Plainview, of which 38.2% had children under the age of 18 living in them. Of all households, 71.9% were married-couple households, 8.3% were households with a male householder and no spouse or partner present, and 17.6% were households with a female householder and no spouse or partner present. About 15.0% of all households were made up of individuals and 10.7% had someone living alone who was 65 years of age or older.

There were 9,207 housing units, of which 3.8% were vacant. The homeowner vacancy rate was 1.2% and the rental vacancy rate was 7.4%.

Racial composition as of the 2020 census
Race	Number	Percent
White	19,466	71.8%
Black or African American	140	0.5%
American Indian and Alaska Native	30	0.1%
Asian	5,555	20.5%
Native Hawaiian and Other Pacific Islander	3	0.0%
Some other race	450	1.7%
Two or more races	1,456	5.4%
Hispanic or Latino (of any race)	1,598	5.9%

=== 2000 census ===
As of the 2000 census, there were 8,963 households, out of which 36.5% had children under the age of 18 living with them and 73.0% were married couples living together. 16.3% of all households were made up of individuals living alone, and 11.9% had someone living alone who was 65 years of age or older. The average household size was 2.87 and the average family size was 3.24. In the CDP, the population was spread out, with 25.1% under the age of 18, 5.5% from 18 to 24, 26.0% from 25 to 44, 26.5% from 45 to 64, and 17.0% who were 65 years of age or older. The median age was 41 years. For every 100 females, there were 94.3 males. For every 100 females age 18 and over, there were 89.4 males.

=== Income ===
According to the 2020 Census estimate, the median income for a household in the CDP was $181,423, and the median income for a family was $211,995. None of the families and 0.8% of the population were living below the poverty line, including no under eighteens and 0.7% of those over 64.

== Economy ==
While largely a suburban enclave, in addition to its numerous shopping centers and strip malls, Plainview has approximately 330 acres (130 ha) of commercial property, spread across three office parks. The most notable tenants include Veeco and Aeroflex (now Cobham), which are headquartered there.

== Houses of Worship ==
There are numerous houses of worship located in Plainview.

Plainview is home to several Jewish congregations. Plainview Synagogue and Young Israel of Plainview are Orthodox. Plainview Jewish Center and Manetto Hill Jewish Center are Conservative. Temple Chaverim is reform.

Churches include Good Shepherd Lutheran Church, The Church of Jesus Christ of Latter-Day Saints, Plainview United Methodist Church (also known as the Korean United Methodist Church), Plainview Reformed Church, St. Pius X Roman Catholic Church and Episcopal Church of St. Margaret, which includes a cemetery in its backwoods.

In addition, there is also the Guru Gobind Singh Sikh Center, Inc., a Sikh temple. This temple's building formerly housed the Bethel United Pentecostal Church. In addition, Plainview is home to Beth Yeshua/Olive Tree Congregation, a Messianic temple.

== Education ==
The Plainview-Old Bethpage Central School District services children from Kindergarten through Grade 12. This school district contains one high school, two middle schools, and four elementary schools. Of these schools, all but one are in Plainview.

Small parts of Plainview are served by the Syosset Central School District and the Bethpage Union Free School District.

There are multiple private schools in Plainview, and Farmingdale State College is located in nearby Farmingdale.

=== Library ===
Plainview is served by the Plainview–Old Bethpage Public Library.

The Plainview Library was first established in 1956 in the Jamaica Avenue School, and later opened as a separate facility in the Morton Village Shopping Center in 1958. Significant increases in population caused the library to outgrow this space. In March 1962, voters approved a $711,000 bond issue to pay for the purchase of a nearly three-acre parcel of land and development of a new library building directly across the street from Morton Village. Two years later, the library moved into its new facilities. Since its construction, the building has had two major expansions to better serve the community's needs, including increased audio/visual and internet demands. In 2005, a 236-seat auditorium was built, and expanded Family Center and Media Center areas were added. In 2014, library space was added from funds received previously from the New York State Dormitory Authority. The new space was updated and redesigned with additional study rooms/public meeting areas, along with self-checkout stations, an integrated Media Area and a new Technology Department. The Plainview-Old Bethpage Library has been recognized by Library Journal as a "5 Star Library."

== Arts and culture ==
The Mid Island Y-Jewish Community Center, which opened in 1956, serves residents of Plainview, Old Bethpage, Syosset and surrounding areas.

== Parks and recreation ==
Plainview has numerous community parks tucked in between homes. Its primary park is the 19-acre (77,000 m^{2}) Plainview-Old Bethpage Community Park, located on Washington Avenue. Opened in 1960, this park features an Olympic size pool, a children's pool, baseball/softball fields, tennis courts, racquetball/handball courts, basketball courts, a newly built children's recreation playground, and trails through its woods. The woods spans from the park to the commercial hub and also to smaller community parks in the residential areas of Pal Street. During the summer, the park runs a concession stand. Parks in Plainview are administered by either the Nassau County Department of Parks, Recreation and Museums or the Town of Oyster Bay. In addition, the town is home to a nature preserve called the Manetto Hills Park. This undeveloped parkland was formerly known as the Shattuck Estate.

Captain Omer Neutra Memorial Park – located between Marilyn Boulevard and Phipps Lane – is another local park facility within Plainview.

Borella Fields, located on Plainview Road, is another large community park. It has three baseball fields, a soccer field and a large playground.

== Estates ==
Plainview was home to several grand Gold Coast estates.

- The Schwarzenbach Estate. Robert Schwarzenbach was a very successful textile manufacturer, who purchased an estate on Manetto Hill. The house was demolished long ago to make way for homes, however, one outbuilding still exists. It is located in the Manetto Hills Shopping Center. This building, originally the home provided to the estate's gardener, operated for many years as Malarkey's Tavern. The building presently houses a veterinarian's office. In addition, until the 1990s, a second building was still standing. This building, which had been the estate's chicken coop, was converted into a residence, where the gardener mentioned above eventually moved with his wife. It was located on Manetto Hill Road, just across from Nick Place.
- The Shattuck Estate. The Shattuck Estate was purchased by successful New York City attorney, Edwin Paul Shattuck, who lived there until he died in the 1960s. He was a member of the Shattuck family which owned the Frank G. Shattuck Company. The company operated, among other things, a restaurant chain known as Schrafft Foods. Mr. Shattuck was personal attorney for President Herbert Hoover. They were best friends and died within three days of each other. The property, which totals approximately 138 acres (0.56 km^{2}), was almost developed in the 1970s until community activists forced the county to purchase the property and leave it as a nature preserve. It is located on Washington Avenue and has no signage to indicate its presence. The property's main house was demolished in September 2013. A portion of the property now houses the AHRC's Helen Kaplan Project, a program for developmentally disabled adults.
- The property known as the Nassau County Office Complex, located between the split of Old Country Road and Round Swamp Road, was once home to the Nassau County Sanitarium, a tuberculosis ward. Built on the Taliaferro Estate, primarily in Old Bethpage, the sanitarium was authorized by the Nassau County Board of Supervisors in 1930, and was completed in the early part of the same decade. As tuberculosis was brought under control, the complex of Georgian style buildings was closed in the 1960s. Following its closure, the facility was given over to mixed use, including the establishment of a drug and alcohol rehabilitation center in 1976 and a branch of the Cornell Cooperative Extension. In 1999, Charles Wang, founder of Computer Associates purchased the 144-acre (0.58 km^{2}) property from the county for $23 million. Included in the purchase was 1535 Old Country Road, which at one point housed the corporate offices of the New York Islanders and New York Dragons, both of which were owned by Wang. In addition, the building was home to the Plainview Chinese Cultural Center, an organization founded by Wang. Currently, the site is the home of Country Pointe at Plainview, which mainly hosts senior condos and retail space.

== Media ==
=== Television ===
The Public Broadcasting Service (PBS) Public television station, WLIW, channel 21, formerly broadcast from Plainview at studios located on Channel 21 Drive. Although the studios still remain at this address, the station now shares transmission facilities with WNET on top of One World Trade Center in New York City.

=== Movies ===
Until the 1980s, there were several movie theaters in the community. The multiplexes built in Hicksville and Commack drew patrons away from the local theaters which were subsequently converted, primarily, to office or retail use.

- Century's Morton Village, Morton Village Shopping Center. This theater, located at the western end of the shopping center, was converted to retail space with office space above. It is named for the Morton Village development north and south of the strip mall.
  - Beginning in 1976, the theater began pinning their ticket price to the year and lowered their ticket price to 7 cents. The price was raised a penny a year until their 1984 closure. It was widely referred to as "the 76 cent movie theater" until it closed.
  - During his 1984 Presidential run, Walter Mondale made a campaign stop in the parking lot of the Morton Village Shopping Center immediately adjacent to the theater.
- Old Country Theater. Located west of the intersection of Old Country and Plainview Roads, immediately west of the Shell gas station. Initially a single screen theater, it was converted into a twin. After its closure, the building was converted to an office building, housing mostly medical offices.
- RKO Plainview Twin. This movie theater was located behind the Plainview Centre on South Oyster Bay Road. This building was converted (and expanded) into today's ShopRite.

=== Radio ===
Plainview is home to WPOB 88.5 FM, the local radio station located in the Plainview-Old Bethpage John F. Kennedy High School. The school shares the same frequency as Syosset High School's WKWZ station.

== Notable people ==
- Hoodie Allen, professional rapper; graduate of Plainview-Old Bethpage JFK High School (Class of '06.)
- Bruce Berman, film and television composer and studio musician, now residing in Los Angeles.
- Jessica Brungo, basketball player for the Connecticut Sun of the WNBA.
- Harrison Chad, actor, played Boots the Monkey on Dora the Explorer on Nickelodeon and starred in Caroline, or Change. (Class of 2010).
- Terry Finn, Teresa Jo Ann Bernadette 'Terry' Finn is an American actress best known for creating the role of Gussie Carnegie in the original Broadway cast of the Stephen Sondheim/Hal Prince/George Furth musical comedy Merrily We Roll Along. Lived in Plainview (1955–1974).
- Diane Franklin, actress, significant roles in Better Off Dead and Bill and Ted's Excellent Adventure, graduated in 1980 from Plainview Old-Bethpage High School.
- Maxwell Jacob Friedman, professional wrestler currently working for All Elite Wrestling, former three time AEW World Champion
- Jack Gallagher, composer recorded by the London Symphony Orchestra, graduated in 1965 from Plainview-Old Bethpage High School.
- Brad Greenberg, head coach of the Radford University men's basketball team; graduate of Plainview JFK High School (Class of '72).
- Seth Greenberg, head coach of the Virginia Tech men's basketball team; graduate of Plainview JFK High School (Class of '74).
- Danielle Harris, actress, modern scream queen most known for playing Jamie Lloyd in the Halloween (franchise) series.
- LeRoy Homer Jr., first officer of United Airlines Flight 93.
- Marc Iavaroni, assistant coach of the Toronto Raptors; graduate of Plainview JFK High School (Class of '74).
- Russell Javors, long-time guitarist for Billy Joel
- Aaron Karo, professional comedian; graduate of Plainview-Old Bethpage JFK High School (Class of '97).
- Frank London (born 1958), composer and musician
- Robert Longo, painter and sculptor, graduated from Plainview-Old Bethpage High School in 1970.
- Chuck Lorre, born Charles Levine, television writer and producer of hit series such as The Big Bang Theory, Young Sheldon, Mom, Two and a Half Men; graduate of Plainview-Old Bethpage High School (Class of 1970).
- Lisa Matassa, country singer and originator of "Long Island Country".
- Ben, Brett, and Jordan Meiselas, brothers and co-founders of MeidasTouch, a political news and commentary network; graduates of John F. Kennedy High School.
- Jeffrey Miller, one of four students killed in the Kent State shootings. Miller is the victim in the iconic John Filo photo.
- Omer Neutra, Israeli-American tank captain killed and kidnapped in the October 7 attacks.
- Philip Plotch author and professor; graduate of Plainview-Old Bethpage High School (Class of '79).
- John Savage (born John Youngs; August 25, 1949), actor, best known for his performances in The Deer Hunter and Hair, graduated from Plainview-Old Bethpage High School in 1967.
- Charles W. Shea, World War II veteran and recipient of the Congressional Medal of Honor. Ordered to take a hill near Mount Damiano, Italy, Shea proceeded alone, lobbing grenades at the enemy and engaging in a fire fight. He killed three gunners and ultimately obtained the surrender of six enemy soldiers before completing his mission and taking the hill.
- Balaji Srinivasan, entrepreneur and investor.
- Bruce Sussman, Songwriter and librettist, lived in Plainview 1958–1961, attending Manetto Hill, Parkway, and Joyce Road Schools, and Plainview-Old Bethpage High School.
- Scott Ullger, first base coach and outfield instructor for the Minnesota Twins of the American League.
- Danny Werfel, Current Commissioner of the Internal Revenue Service, graduate of John F. Kennedy High School (Class of '89).
- Robin Young (born Robin Cardwell Youngs) (Class of '68), well-known television and radio personality in the Boston area. She currently hosts Public Radio International's daily news magazine Here and Now which is produced at WBUR in Boston.
