= Alexander Turney Stewart =

American businessman (1803–1876)

Alexander Stewart
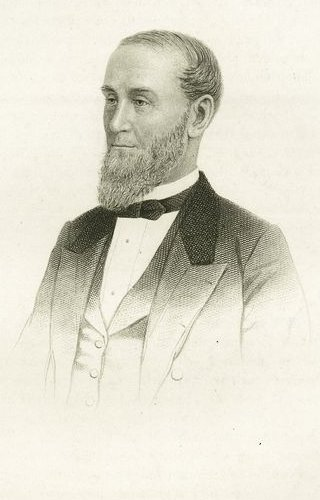
- Born: Alexander Turney Stewart; October 12, 1803; Lisburn, Ulster, Ireland
- Died: April 10, 1876 (aged 72); New York City, New York, U.S.
- Education: Belfast Academical Institution
- Political party: Republican
- Spouse: Cornelia Mitchell Clinch (m. 1823)

Signature
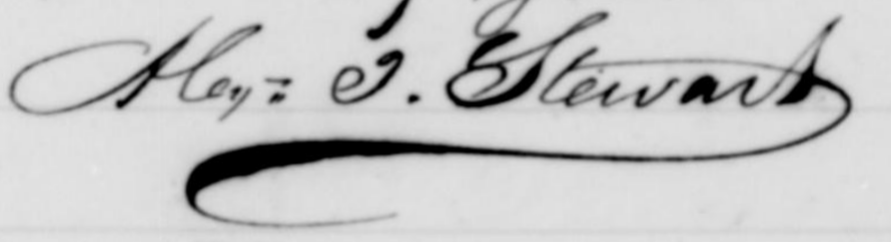

Alexander Turney Stewart (October 12, 1803 – April 10, 1876) was an Irish-American entrepreneur who moved to New York and made his multimillion-dollar fortune in the most extensive and lucrative dry goods store in the world.

Stewart was born in Lisburn, Ulster, Ireland, and abandoned his original aspirations of joining the clergy to go to New York City in 1823. He spent a short time teaching before returning to Ireland to receive the money his grandfather had left him, purchase some Belfast linens and laces, and return to New York to open a store.

Stewart had extraordinary skill in business, and by 1846 he had built a large marble-fronted store on Broadway between Chambers Street and Reade Street, which was devoted to the wholesale branch of his business. In 1862 he built a new store covering an entire city block between Broadway and Fourth Avenue and between 9th and 10th streets. It was eight stories tall and attracted the wonder and business of upscale New York. Trainloads of wealthy customers from outlying cities came to shop.

Stewart made most of his money through wholesaling and especially New York City real estate. He opened branches of the company in other parts of the world and owned several mills and factories. He had an annual income of US$1,843,637 in 1863 (equivalent to $36.8 million in 2024). His business success is estimated to have made him one of the twenty wealthiest people in history as of 2007, with a fortune equivalent to approximately US$90 billion in 2012.

== Early years ==
Alexander Turney Stewart was born in Lisburn, Ireland, to Scottish Protestant parents on October 12, 1803. Three weeks after his birth, Stewart's farmer father died of tuberculosis. About two years later Stewart's mother remarried and followed her new husband to America, leaving Stewart behind to be raised by his grandfather, John Torney.

Torney wanted his only grandson to become a minister in the Church of Ireland. At age seven Stewart was sent to a village school, and in 1814 entered Mr. Neely's English Academy. When Stewart's grandfather died in 1816 he was brought into the home of Thomas Lamb, an Irish Quaker.

Upon completing his formal education at Belfast Academical Institution he wrote to his mother in New York City. While incubating a desire to move there, the fifteen-year-old Stewart was prevailed upon by Lamb to gain some business experience by earning money as a grocer in Belfast. Quickly wearying of the work, Stewart packed his bags in the spring of 1818 and left for New York with the $500 he had earned as a bag boy.

After six weeks at sea, Stewart arrived at his mother's home. He became a $300-a-year tutor at Isaac N. Bragg's Academy, a school for wealthy youths on Roosevelt Street, and joined an Episcopal church run by Reverend Edward Mitchell. There he met his future wife, Cornelia Mitchell Clinch, the daughter of Susannah Banker and James Clinch, a wealthy ship chandler. Cornelia's brother Charles P. Clinch (1797–1880) was Acting Collector of the Port of New York.

== A. T. Stewart & Co. ==
Historians know little about Stewart's life between 1818 and 1822, except that he returned to Ireland upon receiving his grandfather's inheritance of value between US$5,000 and $10,000. The will pertaining to Stewart stated:

I bequeath to my dear grandson ALEXANDER all the rest of my property, houses, and land, with the appurtenances thereto, stock, crop, and chattels of every kind. The money arising from the sale of the property devised to him to be subject to the payment by my said grandson ALEXANDER T. STEWART of an annuity to his grandmother, MARTHA STEWART, of three guineas a year during her life.

Upon returning to New York City in 1823, Stewart married Cornelia on October 16. Before marrying, Stewart opened his first store, located at 283 Broadway, which sold Irish fabrics and domestic calicos purchased with funds from his inheritance and earnings as a tutor.

A. T. Stewart & Co. logo c. 1872

The store opened on September 1, 1823, just across from City Hall Park, north of Chambers Street on the opposite side of Broadway from where his later Marble Palace was to stand. Rented for $375 a year, it measured 12.5 feet wide by 30 feet deep, rather small by today's standards but average during the 19th century. A larger front section used for the business was divided by a thin wall from a smaller back section which served as Stewart's residence.

Unlike other dry goods competitors located along Pearl Street, Stewart placed his store several blocks west on Broadway. He believed customers would travel to buy goods where they could most easily find the best prices, stating that the key to success was not where the store was placed, but rather where "to obtain wholesale trade to undersell competitors".

When first opening the store, Stewart placed cases full of merchandise along the sidewalk in front of the store as a way of advertising his establishment. Stewart claimed that "the messy clutter in front of the store and pushing crowds advertised the business."

As he rose to the top of the retail developers, Stewart included no signs on any place of his store and did not use any advertisements until May 13, 1831. He felt that anyone who wanted to shop in his store would "know where it was located."

A natural salesman, Stewart realized that "you will deal with ignorant, opinionated and innocent people. You will often have an opportunity to cheat them. If they could, they would cheat you, or force you to sell at less than cost. You must be wise, but not too wise. You must never actually cheat the customer, even if you can.... You must make her happy and satisfied, so she will come back." Stewart held that the key to establishing a great business was to make friends with the customers and encourage their return, i.e., to focus on customer service.

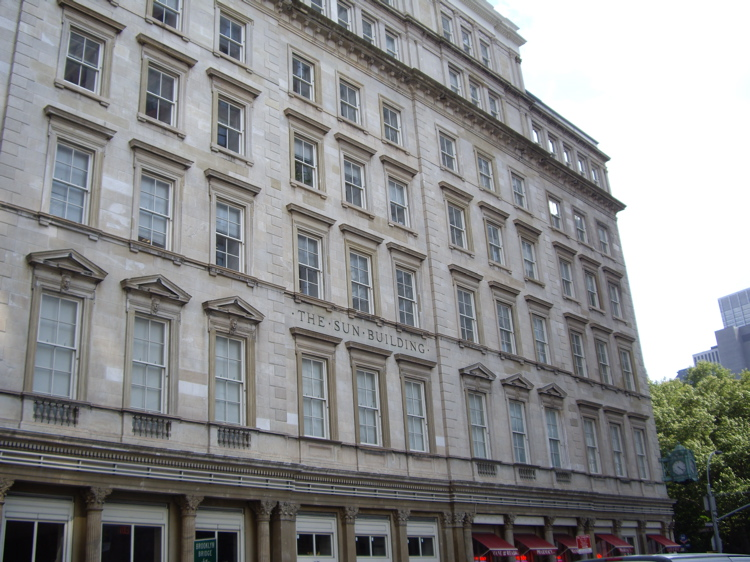
280 Broadway, "The cradle of the department store"

Between 1845 and 1846, the construction and finishing details of one of Stewart's most famous buildings, the "Marble Palace" at 280 Broadway, were completed. This establishment, "the cradle of the department store", sent A. T. Stewart & Company to the top of America's most successful retailers.

The building, originally four stories over a ground floor supported on cast-iron Corinthian columns, survives at 280 Broadway at the corner of Chambers Street, just across from his first store. It offered imported European women's clothing. In addition to its merchandise, the second floor offered the first women's "fashion shows" as full-length mirrors enabled women to view themselves from different angles.

The Italianate design, faced with Tuckahoe marble, featured four floors of pedimented windows, the first commercial building in the United States to display an extravagant exterior. Inside, Stewart wanted not only to display his merchandise, but to emphasize natural light from the structure's central rotunda and high ceilings.

"The Marble Palace" was the first "big store" that sold merchandise and was a huge financial success. In 1855 Stewart's personal fortune was estimated to be $2.25 million. In 1856 Stewart expanded his merchandise to include furs, "the best and most natural skins", as customers were told. In the 1850s, he also followed other retailers such as Macy's, Lord and Taylor and B. Altman and Company to the area which was to be called "Ladies' Mile", on Broadway and Sixth Avenue between 9th Street and 23rd Street.

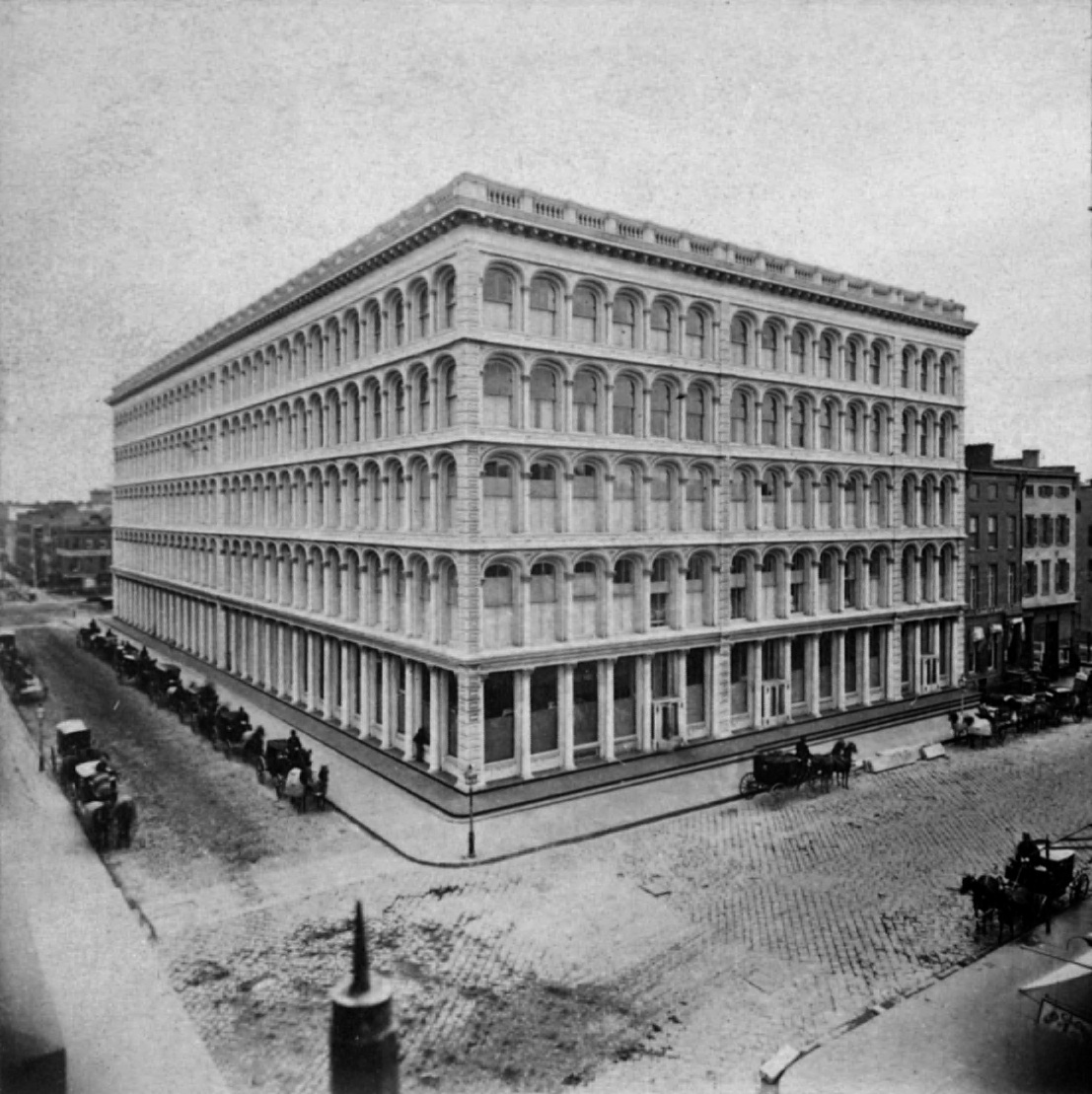
A. T. Stewart's cast-iron "Palace", built in 1862, occupied a full block at Broadway and 10th St.

However, in 1862, Stewart's largest department store, referred to as the "Iron Palace", was built. This six-story building, with its cast-iron front, glass dome skylight and grand emporium, employed up to 2,000 people. The immense structure occupied a major portion of a city block near Grace Church, from Broadway and Ninth Street to Tenth Street and Astor Place. The establishment's nineteen departments included silks, dress goods, carpets, and toys.

By 1877 it had expanded to thirty departments, carrying a wide variety of items. As noted by The New York Times, "a man may fit up his house there down to the bedding, carpets and upholstery."

The Iron Palace building was taken over in 1882 by Hilton, Hughes & Co. (who were associates of Stewart), then by Wanamaker's department store in 1896, ultimately burning down in 1956. Drawings of the interior from the Hilton, Hughes era.

=== Mail order business ===
A. T. Stewart & Company did not go unnoticed throughout the country. Along with his successful retail store in New York City, Stewart also established himself as one of the wealthiest men in the United States by allowing women all over the country to purchase and order items from his wholesale department store.

Beginning in 1868, Stewart began receiving letters from women in rural parts of the United States requesting his merchandise. Stewart promptly replied to these letters and orders by sending out the requested products and even paying the postage. Once their orders were received, women would send back the payment for them.

Seeing potential for the mail order business, by 1876 Stewart had hired twenty clerks to read, respond and mail out the entailed orders. That year he profited by over $500,000 from the mailing business alone. Stewart's mail-order business' efficiency, convenience and profits gained so much attention from all over the country that other famous businesses such as Sears, Montgomery Ward and Spiegel's followed in his footsteps.

== Defeated for Secretary of the Treasury ==
In March 1869 President Ulysses S. Grant offered Stewart the position of Secretary of the Treasury (after Joseph Seligman had declined it), but he was not confirmed by the United States Senate. One impediment to Stewart's appointment was a provision in the 1789 law which established the Treasury Department, prohibiting an importer from heading the Department. Grant requested the two houses of Congress to override the provision, but upon the objection of Charles Sumner, the request was not considered in the Senate. The main reason was that Republicans were angry with Stewart for supporting President Andrew Johnson, and for opposing high protective tariffs that the Republican Party promoted in its appeal to industry.

== Fifth Avenue mansion ==
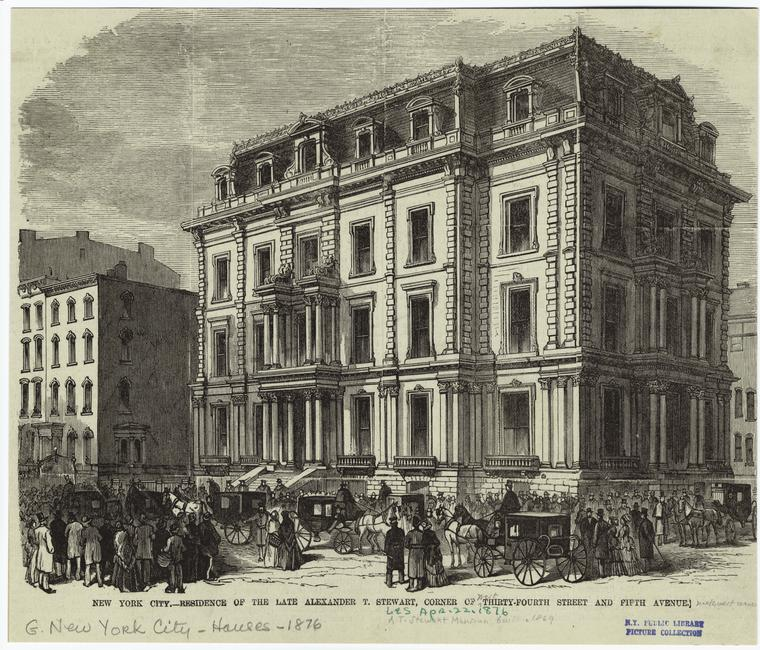
New York City residence of A. T. Stewart, corner of 34th Street and Fifth Avenue

In 1869 and 1870 A. T. Stewart built the first of the grand Fifth Avenue palaces, on the northwest corner of 34th Street, across from the doyenne of New York society, Caroline Schermerhorn Astor. His architect, as for the store, was John Kellum. When all of Fifth Avenue was of brownstone rowhouses, Stewart's fireproof structure in French Second Empire style was faced with marble.

It had three main floors and an attic in a mansard roof. A mezzanine floor at cornice height was used for storage. The house was separated from the sidewalks by a moat-like light well that lit the service areas in the basement. The main parlor ran the full length of the house's Fifth Avenue frontage.

On the death of Stewart's widow in 1886, it was rented as premises for the Manhattan Club and was portrayed in paint in 1891 by Childe Hassam. The structure was razed in 1901 to make way for the new premises of the Knickerbocker Trust Company. Elements from the Mansion were salvaged, and survive, incorporated into the structures of Our Lady of Lourdes Church (Manhattan) on 142nd Street and the Ross-Hand Mansion in Nyack.

== Central Railroad ==
Stewart incorporated the Central Railroad of Long Island in 1871 and completed it in 1873, running from Long Island City through his development at Garden City to a brick yard at (Old) Bethpage and docks at Babylon. This became part of the Long Island Rail Road system in 1876, and the parts that have not been abandoned are the Hempstead Branch and Central Branch. The brickyard continued into existence until 1981, variously known as Bethpage Brickworks, Queens County Brick Manufacturing Company, and (after Nassau County split from Queens County in 1899) Nassau Brick Company.

== Death and influence ==
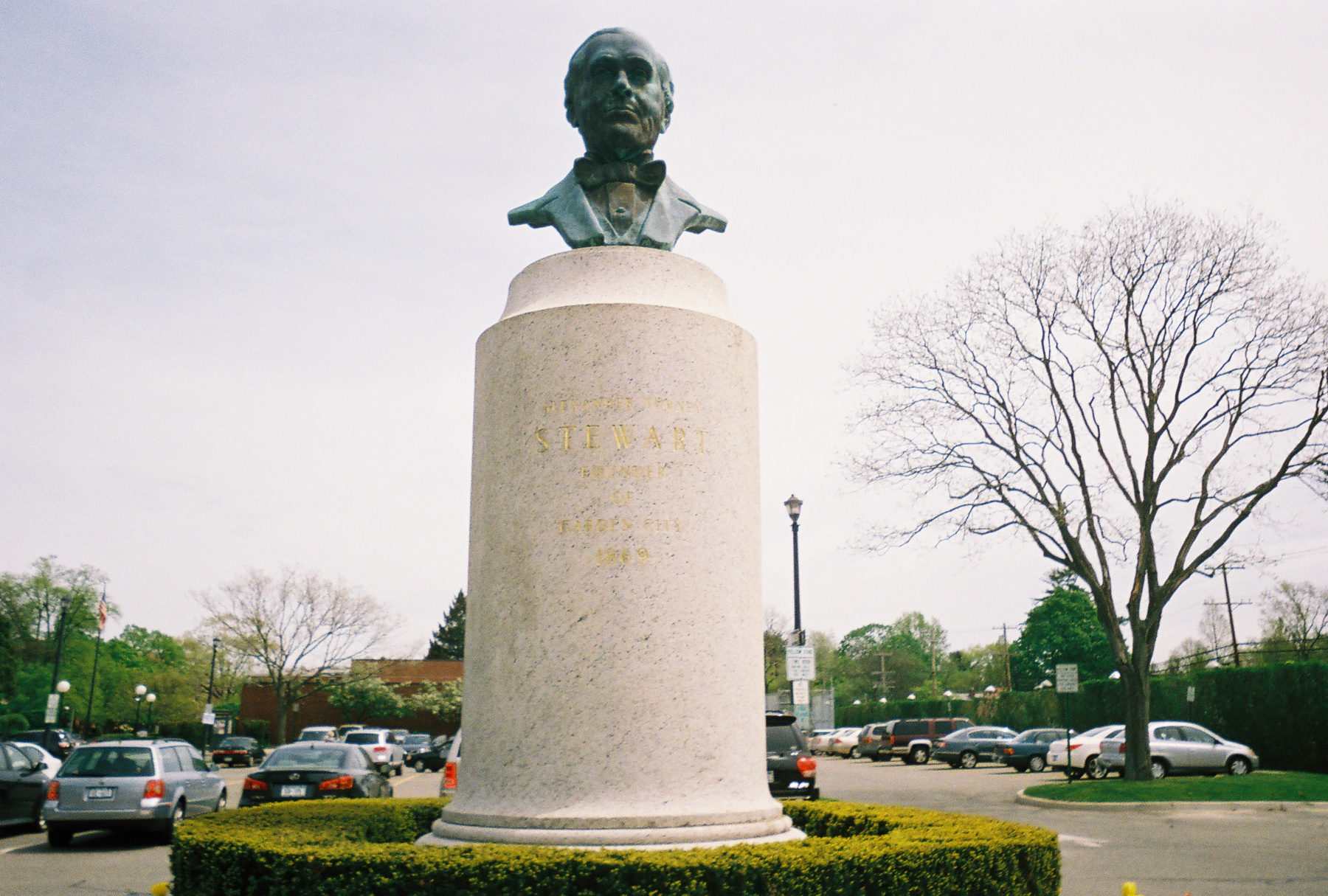
Bust honoring Stewart in the Garden City Long Island Rail Road station's parking lot

Before Stewart died in 1876, he had succeeded in creating his own manufacturing facilities. He wanted to have his own mills to supply his wholesale and retail operations. With these mills, located in New York and New England, Stewart produced his own woolen fabrics and employed thousands of workers. Stewart also served on several New York State Chamber of Commerce Committees between 1862 and 1871. Though never elected as a New York State officer, he attended Lincoln's funeral as a Chamber delegate.

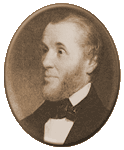
Miniature of Stewart

Before his death he was building at Hempstead Plains, Long Island, the village of Garden City, with the purpose of affording his employees comfortable and airy housing at a moderate cost. After his death, his wife Cornelia erected several buildings in his memory, including St. Paul's School and The Cathedral of the Incarnation, Garden City; the latter also served as a mausoleum to both Stewart and his wife.

Stewart died as one of the richest men in New York, just behind a Vanderbilt and an Astor. Worth an estimated $50 million, Stewart, unlike New York's other wealthy men who made their millions through real estate, had earned his wealth in retail trade. Out of the twenty-four clerks who entered A. T. Stewart & Company in 1836, six still worked for the company in 1876. To these long-term employees, Stewart showed his gratitude by leaving them more than $250,000 (equivalent to $8,000,000 in 2025) in his will.

The body of Stewart was stolen from its tomb, between nine o'clock on the evening of November 6, and daylight on the morning of November 7, 1878, 2 years, 6 months, 24 days after his burial at St. Mark's Church in-the-Bowery. The remains were held for $20,000 ransom. The ransom was paid and remains were returned, although never verified as his. A local legend states that the mausoleum holding his remains is rigged with security devices that will cause the bells of the Cathedral to ring if ever disturbed.

According to biographer Harry Resseguie, his vast fortune was soon lost. It:

Was either wasted in inept business ventures, poured into charities never contemplated by its owner, or frittered away in dissipation, luxurious living, or in fees to a swarm of lawyers during a quarter-century of litigation over the estate.

The bulk of the Stewart fortune, willed to Mrs. Stewart with Judge Henry Hilton as trustee, was the subject of protracted litigation, although a swarm of long-lost Turney relatives were quickly dismissed. Claims were based in part on Mrs. Stewart's hasty transfer of the dry goods business in 1876 to Hilton, in exchange for the $1,000,000 willed to Hilton, who carried on the business under the name E. J. Denning & Co.

Mrs. Stewart, who lived quietly in New York and at the Grand Union Hotel in Saratoga Springs, New York, which she inherited, died of pneumonia October 25, 1886, and ex-Judge Hilton died there 24 August 1899.

In 1896, the Iron Palace was bought by John Wanamaker and reopened as "Wanamaker's". The Philadelphian Wanamaker had long been an admirer of Stewart and stated that one of his best qualities was his "personal attention to the details of the business... He could have had others to look after the details — they have to be looked after, but few attend to sweeping up, and that's what Stewart did." In 1917 the New York Sun newspaper bought Stewart's Marble Palace for its main offices. In 1966 the building was designated a landmark by the City of New York.

=== Posthumous libel ===
On May 1, 1890, a notice appeared in the New York Times announcing Joseph Pulitzer, Julius Chambers, et al. had been indicted for posthumous criminal libel against Alexander T. Stewart. The newspaper reprinted a letter to District Attorney Fellows citing statements in an April 14–19 series of articles in the New York World accusing Stewart of "a dark and secret crime", as the man who "invited guests to meet his mistresses at his table", and as "a pirate of the dry goods ocean."

== See also ==
- Stewart's was an unrelated, now-defunct, Baltimore, Maryland-based chain of department stores
- Stewart Dry Goods an unrelated now-defunct Louisville, Kentucky chain
- A. T. Stewart (pilot boat) the name of this boat was nominated by the friends of Mr. Stewart
