= Old Bethpage Village Restoration =

Living museum

- Established: 1963; 63 years ago
- Location: 1303 Round Swamp Road, Old Bethpage, NY 11804
- Coordinates: 40.768400°N 73.446611°W
- Website: www.oldbethpagevillagerestoration.org

The Old Bethpage Village Restoration is a 209-acre (0.85 km^{2}) recreated living museum village in Old Bethpage, New York. The village opened in 1970 with dozens of historic structures that had been saved from demolition by Nassau County. Costumed actors provide demonstrations of 19th-century life. It is the site of the annual Long Island Fair.

The village came into existence in 1963, when Nassau County acquired the Powell property, a 165-acre (0.67 km^{2}) farm located on the Nassau–Suffolk border. According to notes written on the county's 1959 master plan, the site originally was planned to become the Nassau County Zoo.

== Description ==
There are currently 51 preserved and seven reconstructed buildings arranged to simulate a typical mid-19th-century Long Island farming village. Only twenty of the buildings are open to the public.

=== Buildings ===
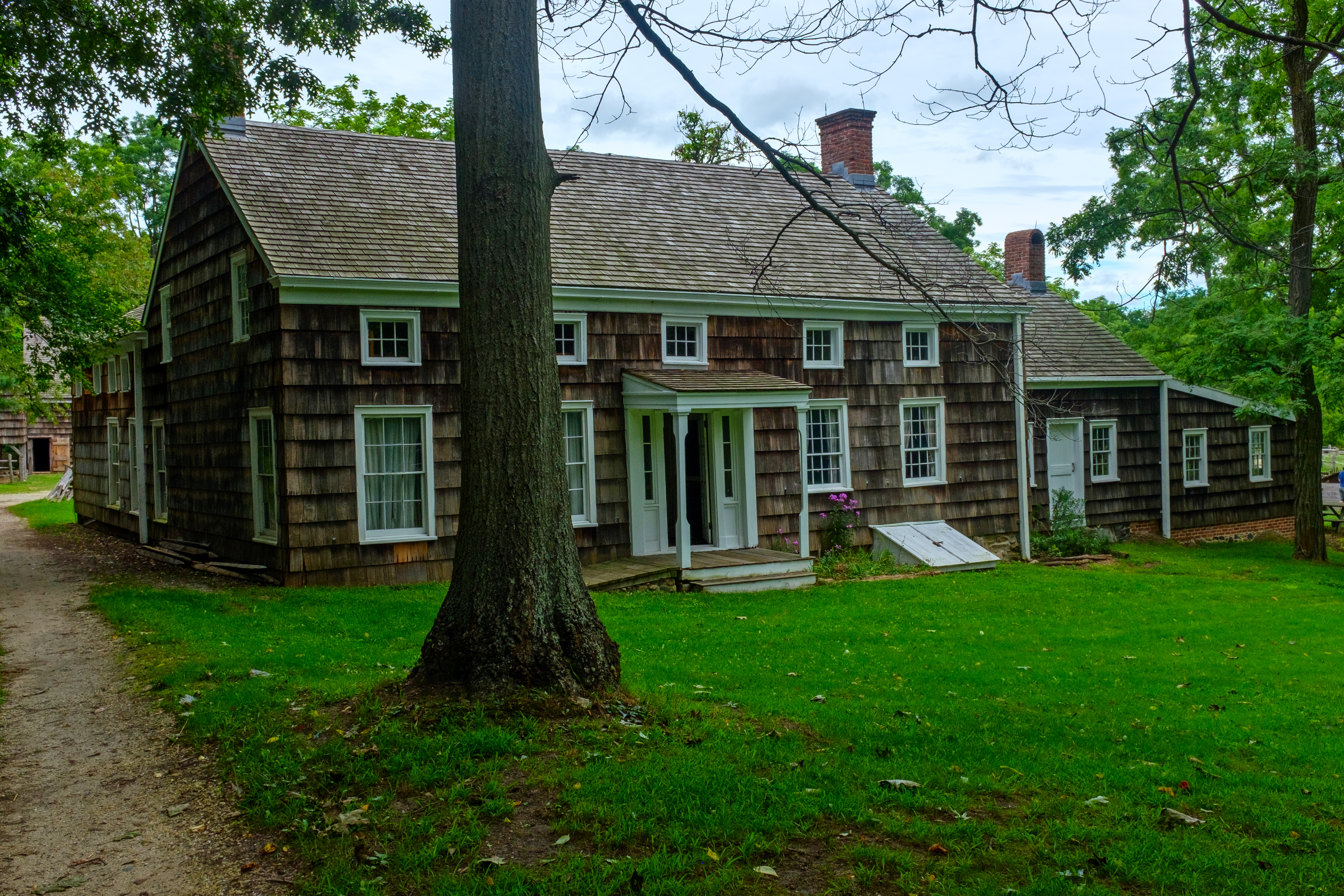
The Powell Farmhouse, the original building on the property

The Powell Farmhouse is the only building that was originally located at the site before it was purchased by the county. The Manetto Hill Methodist Church from Plainview was the first building moved to the site. Layton's Store sells candy while the Noon Inn is a working tavern which sells root beer and pretzels. The Schenck House is a 1730 Dutch farmhouse. The Bach Blacksmith Shop from Hicksville is used to repair and create all the ironworks used in the village.

== Activities ==
There are a number of weekend events including Civil War re-enactments and holiday events, celebrating such occasions as the Fourth of July and Thanksgiving. In the winter, there are also Candlelight Evenings when the front portion of the village is open at night, and the village is decorated for a 19th-century Christmas. There are caroling and specialty snacks and cider, among other festivities. Other special events include "Sheep to Shawl" days, Hands-on-History Sundays (where children can participate in period chores), and Halloween complete with ghost tours, pumpkin carving, and a scavenger hunt. Additionally, the Long Island Fair has been held at the site since the village opened; the fair includes a series of vintage base ball games, played with the mid-19th-century rules, as well as craft sales, and demonstrations of 19th-century crafts and occupations. In recent years, there has been a small summer camp organized for local children in the village, called the Junior Apprentice Program. In 2017, the Restoration added several escape room style interactive games that take place in the historic houses themselves. Other special events include the Great Jack O'Lantern Blaze, Nassau County's largest Halloween event. Each fall, Historic Hudson Valley creates this tremendous artistic production celebrating Long Island’s rich history. It includes a display of thousands of illuminated jack o'lanterns and elaborate pumpkin sculptures hand-carved by local artisans. The experience, which is taking place for 30 nights in 2023, includes an immersive half-mile walking trail with synchronized lighting and an original soundtrack playing throughout the experience.

=== Old Bethpage Village Brass Band ===
The Old Bethpage Village Brass Band is a regularly performing Civil War-style brass band that can oftentimes be seen marching the streets and performing outdoor afternoon concerts. The band was formed by Dr. Kirby Jolly and was featured as one of brass bands on Ken Burns's 1990 PBS mini-series, The Civil War. The Old Bethpage Village Brass Band is the one early American brass band that is fully supported by a county parks department in the country.

== Restoration farm ==
A small private sustainable organic farm was organized on 7 acres (2.8 ha) of the village in 2007. It sells its produce at a farm stand and through a CSA.

== Potential closing ==
In February 2009, Nassau County Executive Thomas Suozzi proposed closing all county parks, including Old Bethpage Village Restoration, in order to reduce the county deficit. There was a petition against this proposal, which claimed that 35,000 students visit the village every year.

== In popular culture ==
In 1983, the village was briefly featured in the Woody Allen mockumentary Zelig.

In 2004, Conan O'Brien filmed a segment at the village for Late Night—a segment O'Brien later claimed was his "personal favorite" in the show's history. For the segment, O'Brien interviewed village actors and participated in a baseball game played under 1860s rules.

The village served as the primary filming location for the exteriors of both Dickinson houses, the Evergreens and the Homestead, and used various building in the village for the Apple TV+ series Dickinson starring Hailee Steinfeld as Emily Dickinson.

The HBO show The Gilded Age has filmed at the village since 2019.
