= Old Bethpage, New York =

- Hamlet and census-designated place
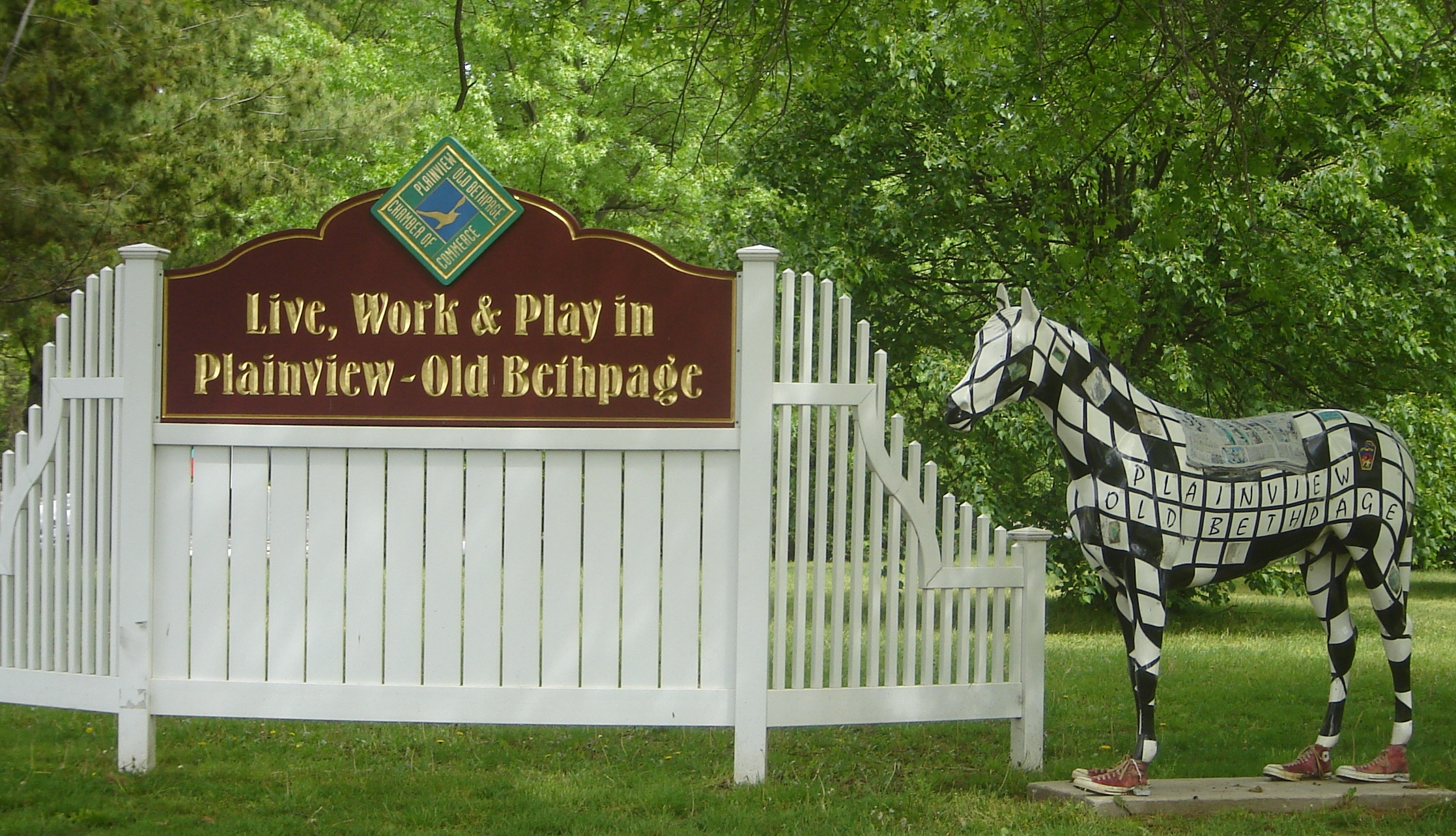

- Location in Nassau County and the state of New York

- Location on Long Island Location within the state of New York
- Coordinates: 40°45′43″N 73°27′16″W
- Country: United States
- State: New York
- County: Nassau
- Town: Oyster Bay

Area
  - Total: 4.17 sq mi (10.80 km^{2})
  - Land: 4.17 sq mi (10.79 km^{2})
  - Water: 0.0039 sq mi (0.01 km^{2})
- Elevation: 174 ft (53 m)

Population (2020)
  - Total: 6,403
  - Density: 1,537.5/sq mi (593.62/km^{2})
- Time zone: UTC-5 (Eastern (EST))
  - Summer (DST): UTC-4 (EDT)
- ZIP Codes: 11804 (Old Bethpage); 11803 (Plainview); 11735 (Farmingdale)
- Area codes: 516, 363
- FIPS code: 36-54551
- GNIS feature ID: 0959252

Old Bethpage is a hamlet and census-designated place (CDP) located within the Town of Oyster Bay, in Nassau County, on Long Island, in New York, United States. The population was 5,283 at the time of the 2020 census.

Old Bethpage and its neighboring hamlet, Plainview, share a school system, library, fire department, and water district. Law enforcement for the community is provided by the Nassau County Police Department's Eighth Precinct.

== History ==
In 1695, Thomas Powell bought about 10,000 acres (40 km^{2}) from local Indian tribes, including the Marsapeque, Matinecoc, and Sacatogue, for 140 English pounds. This land, which includes modern Bethpage, East Farmingdale, Farmingdale, Old Bethpage, Plainedge, Plainview, South Farmingdale, and part of Melville, is known as the Bethpage Purchase and is approximately 3.5 miles (5.6 km) east to west and 5 miles (8.0 km) north to south.

Powell called his land Bethphage, because it was situated between two other places on Long Island, Jericho and Jerusalem, just as the biblical town of Bethphage (meaning "house of figs") was situated between Jericho and Jerusalem. The Long Island place formerly called Jerusalem is known as Wantagh and Island Trees, while the placename Jericho is unaltered. Over time, Bethpage was spelled without the second "H". Powell's 14 children divided his purchase and it evolved into several farming communities. The one in this mostly central part of the purchase retained the name "Bethpage".

A railroad spur completed in 1873, named the Bethpage Branch of the Central Railroad of Long Island, ran to a brickworks which had opened in the 1860s on what became Battle Row and Bethpage-Sweet Hollow Road. The railway was built to transport bricks for the construction of Alexander Stewart's Garden City. For a few years, regularly scheduled passenger traffic also appeared in timetables, with the station named Bethpage. The line was abandoned in 1942. Remnants of a locomotive turntable can be found in the woods of Bethpage State Park on the east side of Round Swamp Road. The brickyard continued operating until 1981, with different sections known as Bethpage Brickworks, Queens County Brick Manufacturing Company, Post Brick Company, and (after Nassau County split from Queens County in 1899) Nassau Brick Company. The pitted terrain at the brickworks was used in investigations by Grumman for digital mapping of Earth.

In 1908, William Kissam Vanderbilt II began construction of the Long Island Motor Parkway, one of the country's first highways. Eventually stretching 45 miles (72 km) from Queens to Lake Ronkonkoma, New York, a portion of the parkway ran through Old Bethpage. Street names such as "Vanderbilt Lane", "Motor Parkway" and "Toll Place" serve as reminders. Segments of the old roadbed and some bridges can still be seen, including Battle Row Campground, Bethpage State Park, and the Old Bethpage Village Restoration.

In 1932, under the auspices of Long Island State Parks Commissioner Robert Moses, Bethpage State Park was opened. The park and its 1,400 acres (5.7 km^{2}) is almost entirely within the hamlet of Old Bethpage. In 1936, the adjacent hamlet of Central Park changed its name to Bethpage. Following the name change, the hamlet originally called Bethpage resisted suggestions that it merge with the new Bethpage, and got approval from the post office to change its name to Old Bethpage, though it did not have its own post office until 1965. Bethpage State Park retained its name, leading some to mistakenly believe that the park is located mostly in Bethpage.

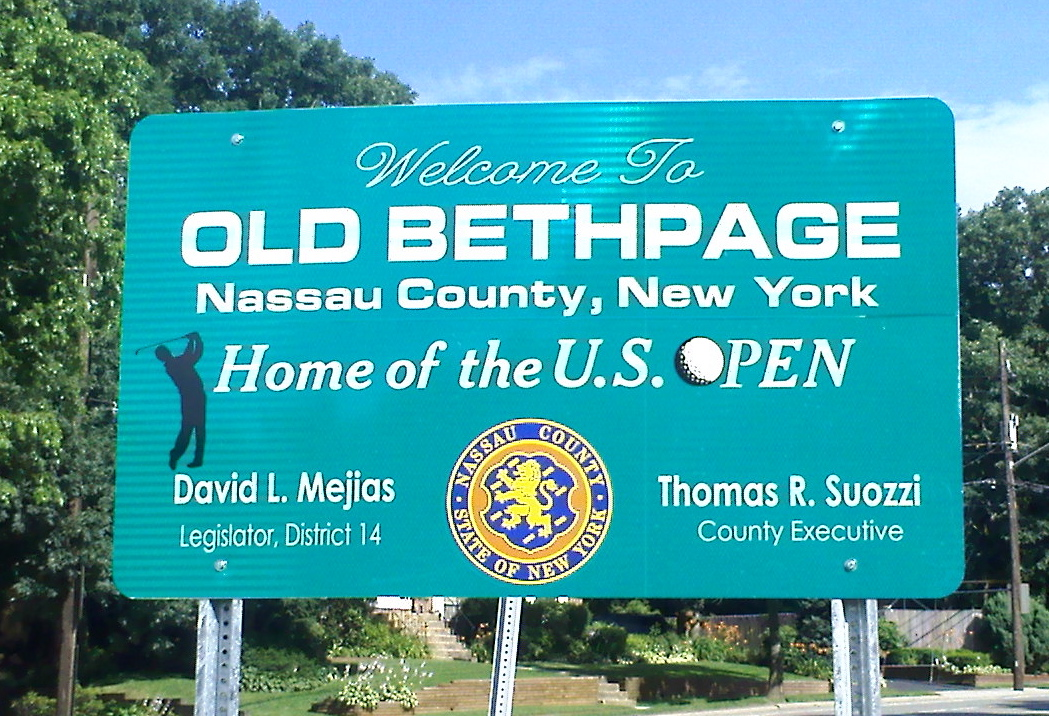
Entry sign into Old Bethpage

Old Bethpage was home to at least two grand estates, the Benjamin Franklin Yoakum Estate and the Taliaferro Estate.

- The former estate of railroad tycoon Benjamin F. Yoakum included land in both Old Bethpage and the Lenox Hills neighborhood of Farmingdale Village. It was this estate that was transformed into Bethpage State Park.
- The Taliaferro Estate is the site of Country Pointe Plainview, located between the split of Old Country Road and Round Swamp Road, and was once home to the Nassau County Sanitarium, a tuberculosis ward. The sanitarium was authorized by the Nassau County Board of Supervisors in 1930, and was completed in the early part of the same decade. As tuberculosis was brought under control, the complex of Georgian style buildings was closed in the 1960s. Following its closure, the facility was given over to mixed use, including the establishment of a drug and alcohol rehabilitation center in 1976, and a branch of the Cornell Cooperative Extension. In 1999, Charles Wang, founder of Computer Associates purchased the 144-acre (0.58 km^{2}) property from the county for $23 million. Included in the purchase was 1535 Old Country Road, which housed the corporate offices of the New York Islanders and New York Dragons, both of which were owned by Wang. In addition, the building was home to the Wang-created Plainview Chinese Cultural Center. In 2015, the Oyster Bay board voted to approve a condominium on the same grounds. The land is known as Country Pointe Plainview and is maintained by Jericho-based Beechwood Homes; the property consists mostly of senior condos and retail space.

In 1960, responding to Nassau County's rapid suburban expansion, the county announced the development of the Nassau County Fire Service Academy. Located on Winding Road, the academy provides training to all Nassau County fire departments.

== Geography ==
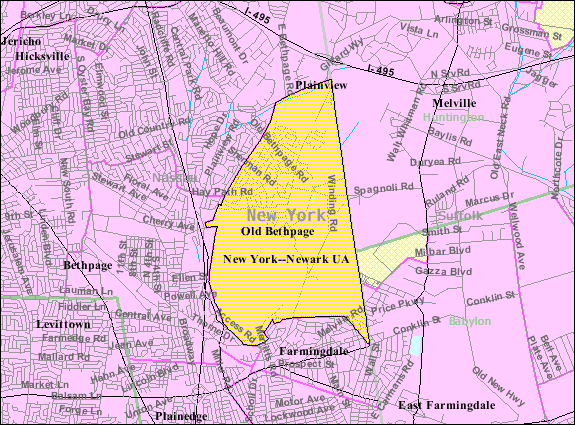
U.S. Census Map of Old Bethpage

According to the United States Census Bureau, Old Bethpage has a total area of 4.1 square miles (11 km^{2}), all land.

For the 2000 Census, the boundaries of the CDP were enlarged beyond those of the 1990 census.

Although Plainview, at 5.7 square miles (15 km^{2}) is 40% larger, its population is approximately five times that of Old Bethpage because significant portions of Old Bethpage consist of parks and undeveloped property, including, Bethpage State Park, the Old Bethpage Village Restoration and Battle Row Campground.

== Demographics ==
Historical population
Census	Pop.	Note	%±
2000	5,400		—
2010	5,523		2.3%
2020	6,403		15.9%
2023 (est.)	6,179	▼	−3.5%
U.S. Decennial Census

As of the 2010 United States census, there were 5,523 people, 1,834 households, and 1,557 families residing in the CDP. The population density was 1,311.4 inhabitants per square mile (506.3/km^{2}). There were 1,843 housing units at an average density of 447.6 per square mile (172.8/km^{2}). The racial makeup of the CDP was 94.57% White, 1.19% African American, 0.04% Native American, 2.94% Asian, 0.35% from other races, and 0.91% from two or more races. Hispanic or Latino of any race were 1.93% of the population.

There were 1,834 households, out of which 38.3% had children under the age of 18 living with them, 75.6% were married couples living together, 7.1% had a female householder with no husband present, and 15.1% were non-families. 13.8% of all households were made up of individuals, and 10.5% had someone living alone who was 65 years of age or older. The average household size was 2.88 and the average family size was 3.16.

In the CDP, the population was spread out, with 24.2% under the age of 18, 5.5% from 18 to 24, 27.1% from 25 to 44, 25.1% from 45 to 64, and 18.0% who were 65 years of age or older. The median age was 41 years. For every 100 females, there were 91.6 males. For every 100 females age 18 and over, there were 90.5 males.

The median income for a household in the CDP was $89,771, and the median income for a family was $100,325. Males had a median income of $67,917 versus $40,353 for females. The per capita income for the CDP was $34,666. About 2.4% of families and 4.3% of the population were below the poverty line, including 4.0% of those under age 18 and 4.6% of those age 65 or over.

== Arts and culture ==
Old Bethpage is home to the Old Bethpage Village Restoration. Opened in 1963 on a former Powell family farm, the restoration is an authentic recreation of a mid-19th century Long Island village. The complex includes farmhouses, a blacksmith, general store, cobbler, school house and churches, all of which were moved to the site from other locations on Long Island and then restored to period condition. In 2009, the Restoration became one of six Nassau County museums slated to be closed as a result of the county's impending budget shortfall. However, as a result of strong public opposition, the museum was announced to remain open on April 1, 2009.

Old Bethpage was home to one movie theater, located in the Tru-Value Shopping Center. This theater initially showed first or second run movies. However, in the 1970s it began to show pornographic movies until community protests forced the theater to revert to its original general commercial offerings. The theater eventually closed and remained vacant for a number of years until it was reopened as a live action theater known as the Plaza Playhouse. The Playhouse remained in Old Bethpage until June 2010, when it moved to a new strip mall on Old Country Road. The space is now vacant.

== Sports ==
For children, there are multiple leagues and organizations they can join. For baseball, they can join the Plainview Little League, and for basketball, the Plainview Police Activity League (PAL). The Plainview-Old Bethpage Soccer Club, as implied, facilitates children's soccer players in the area. Hawks Youth Lacrosse is the local Boys and Girls Youth Lacrosse organization for Plainview-Old Bethpage with teams playing in the Nassau County PAL League.

Old Bethpage is home to "Skate Safe of America", which provides facilities for roller hockey and other indoor sports.

== Parks and recreation ==
Old Bethpage has a number of community parks tucked in between its homes. For residents, the primary park is Haypath Road Park, located on Haypath Road. This park features two tennis courts, baseball and softball fields, a basketball court, playgrounds and a community center. For out-of-towners, the town is also home to the Battle Row Campground, which provides accommodations for trailers and tent camping on its 44 acres (180,000 m^{2}).

Old Bethpage contains Bethpage State Park which has five golf courses, the most famous of which is the Black Course, where the US Open was held in 2002 and again in 2009. The park has also hosted the 2019 PGA Championship, as well as the 2012 and 2016 Barclays, now known as The Northern Trust.

== Education ==
The Plainview-Old Bethpage Central School District services children from Kindergarten through Grade 12. This school district contains one high school, two middle schools, and four elementary schools. Of these schools, the only one located in Old Bethpage proper is Old Bethpage Elementary School. All other schools are located in Plainview.

There are multiple private schools in nearby Plainview, and Farmingdale State College is located in nearby Farmingdale.

Old Bethpage also has had two schoolbuildings in the past. One was constructed in 1825 north of the current elementary school in Old Bethpage, and one two room school house named the Little Red Schoolhouse. This building, which stood until the 1970s, was located on Schoolhouse Road, just off of Round Swamp Road. The building was torn down and the property developed into several houses.

== See also ==
- Bethpage, New York
- Plainview, New York
- Bethpage Purchase
