= Garden City =

Garden City or Garden Suburb may refer to:

== Design and planning ==
- Garden city movement, an urban planning movement
- Town and Country Planning Association, a British charity originally known as the Garden City Association

== Places ==
=== Africa and the Middle East ===
- Garden City, Cairo, Egypt, a district
- Garden City (Nigeria), nickname of Port Harcourt
- Garden City, Khartoum
- Kumasi, Ghana, nicknamed "The Garden City" due to its abundance of gardens and forestry

=== Asia ===
- Bengaluru, nicknamed the 'Garden City of India' due to several prominent parks and tree-lined roads
- Singapore, nicknamed the 'Garden City' due to its parks and tree-lined streets

=== Europe ===
==== United Kingdom ====
- Garden City, Flintshire, Wales
- Garden Suburb, Oldham, Greater Manchester, England
- Hampstead Garden Suburb, London, England
- Humberstone Garden Suburb, Leicester, England
- Letchworth Garden City, Hertfordshire, England, designed by Ebenezer Howard, originator of the Garden City movement
- Welwyn Garden City, Hertfordshire, England, also designed by Howard

==== France ====
- Garden City of Suresnes, designed by Alexandre Maistrasse, Julien Quoniam and Félix Dumail
- Garden City, Stains, designed by Eugène Gonnot and Georges Albenque
- Garden City, Pré-Saint-Gervais, designed by Félix Dumail

==== Elsewhere in Europe ====
- Gartenstadt (Garden City), districts of Krefeld and Nuremberg, Germany

=== North America ===
==== Canada ====
- Garden City, Winnipeg
- Garden City Skyway, a major high-level bridge in St. Catharines and Niagara-on-the-Lake, Ontario, Canada
- St. Catharines, Ontario, also known as "The Garden City"
- Victoria, British Columbia, also known as "The Garden City"

==== United States ====
- Garden City, Alabama
- Garden City, Colorado
- Garden City, Florida
- Garden City, Georgia
- Garden City, Idaho
- Garden City, Indiana
- Garden City, Iowa
- Garden City, Kansas
  - Garden City (Amtrak station)
- Garden City, Michigan
- Garden City, Minnesota
- Garden City, Missouri
- Garden City, New York
  - Garden City (LIRR station)
- Garden City, Pennsylvania
- Garden City, a village within Cranston, Rhode Island
- Garden City, South Carolina
- Garden City, South Dakota
- Garden City, Texas
- Garden City, Utah
- Garden City, Roanoke, Virginia
- Maitland, South Dakota, originally called Garden City
- Missoula, Montana, nicknamed "The Garden City"

=== Oceania ===
- Garden City, a shopping district in Suva, Fiji
- Garden City, Victoria, a locality within Port Melbourne, Victoria
- Garden Suburb, New South Wales, Australia
- Christchurch, New Zealand, nicknamed "The Garden City"
- Toowoomba, Queensland, Australia, nicknamed "The Garden City"
- Westfield Mt Gravatt, formerly Westfield Garden City, in Queensland, Australia
- Canberra, capital of Australia

=== South America ===
- Ciudad Jardín Lomas del Palomar, Buenos Aires, Argentina
- Maracay, Venezuela, nicknamed "Ciudad Jardín" ("Garden City")
- Viña del Mar, Chile, nicknamed "Ciudad Jardín" ("Garden City")

== See also ==
- Garden City station (disambiguation), stations of the name
- Knowle West, Bristol, England, built as a council housing estate constructed on garden city principles
- Kuala Kubu Bharu, Selangor, Malaysia; the first garden township in Asia
- Meadowridge, a suburb that is the second garden city in Cape Town, South Africa
- Moor Pool, a garden suburb within the ward of Harborne, Birmingham, England
- Nunsthorpe, a suburb of Grimsby, England
- Pinelands, Cape Town, a garden city in Cape Town, South Africa
- Södra Ängby, a residential area blending functionalism with garden city ideals, Stockholm, Sweden, forming part of the Bromma borough
- Tapiola, a garden city district of Espoo, Finland
- Wythenshawe, a district of Manchester, England, a housing estate started in the 1920s and intended as a "garden city"

== Arts, entertainment, and media ==
- "Garden City", B-side of the 1984 Orchestral Manoeuvres in the Dark single "Tesla Girls"
- Garden City Radio 89.9, a radio station in Old GRA, Port Harcourt, Nigeria

== Brands and enterprises ==
- Garden City Hotel, in Garden City, New York, US
- Garden City Mall, Nairobi, a shopping complex in Kasarani, Kenya
- Garden City Publishing, an imprint of Doubleday
- Westfield Booragoon, a shopping centre in Booragoon, Western Australia formerly named Garden City
- Westfield Mt Gravatt, a shopping centre in Upper Mount Gravatt, Brisbane, Australia formerly named Westfield Garden City

== Other uses ==
- Garden City Collegiate, a high school in Winnipeg, Manitoba

== See also ==
- Garden Village (disambiguation)
- Green City (disambiguation)
- City of Trees (disambiguation)
- Emerald City (disambiguation)
- Sustainable city, green city, or eco-city, designed with consideration of environmental impact
