= Garden Village =

Garden Village may refer to the following places:

- Garden Village, Kentucky
- Garden Village, a housing estate in Micklefield, Leeds, England
- Garden Village, Ontario, Canada
- Garden Village, Swansea, Wales
  - Garden Village A.F.C.
- Garden Village, Wrexham, Wales
- Garden Village, a suburb in Somerset West, South Africa
- Garden Village, Kingston upon Hull, England

== See also ==
- Alverstone Garden Village
- Alkrington Garden Village
- Langarth Garden Village
- Garden City (disambiguation) – includes Garden Suburb
- Garden city movement
