= Garden Village, Kentucky =

Unincorporated community in Kentucky, United States

Coordinates: 37°25′15″N 82°27′55″W

- Unincorporated community
- Interactive map of Garden Village, Kentucky
- Country: United States
- State: Kentucky
- County: Pike
- Established: 1945
- Founder: William Justice
- Named for: Garden City, New York

Garden Village is an unincorporated community in Pike County, Kentucky. It is located on the Levisa Fork of the Big Sandy River, below the Peyton Branch and 4 miles (6.4 km) southeast of Pikeville.

== History ==
It was founded as Liberty upon the creation of the county in 1822, with the intention of the community becoming the seat of local governance. The site proved unpopular with local residents and Liberty was ultimately replaced by Pike (present-day Pikeville) the next year. Garden Village was established on the site by local landowner William Justice in 1945 and named after Garden City, New York, which he had once visited. It does not have a separate post office.

== See also ==
- Other places named Garden Village
