= City of Trees =

City of Trees may refer to any city designated as a Tree City USA, a Tree City of the World, or a city that has been awarded the title "European City of the Trees". The following list includes nicknames for cities established prior to these initiatives, or by other means.

== Currently nicknamed cities ==
- Atlanta, Georgia, United States
- Boise, Idaho, United States
- Buffalo, New York, United States
- Burlingame, California, United States
- Chico, California, United States
- Claremont, California, United States – "The City of Trees and PhDs"
- Fairway, Kansas, United States
- Halifax, Nova Scotia. Canada
- Pleasant Grove, Utah, United States – "Utah's City of Trees"
- Royal Oak, Michigan, United States
- Sacramento, California, United States
- South Pasadena, California, United States
- Sendai, Miyagi Prefecture, Japan
- Tustin, California, United States
- Woodland, California, United States
- Sylvania, Ohio, United States
- Winchester, Virginia, United States

== Formerly nicknamed cities ==
- Highland Park, Michigan, United States
- Sacramento, California, United States

== Other uses ==
- City of Trees, a collection of essays by Sophie Cunningham
- City of Trees (film), a 2015 documentary film directed by Brandon Kramer
