= Suresnes =

- Commune
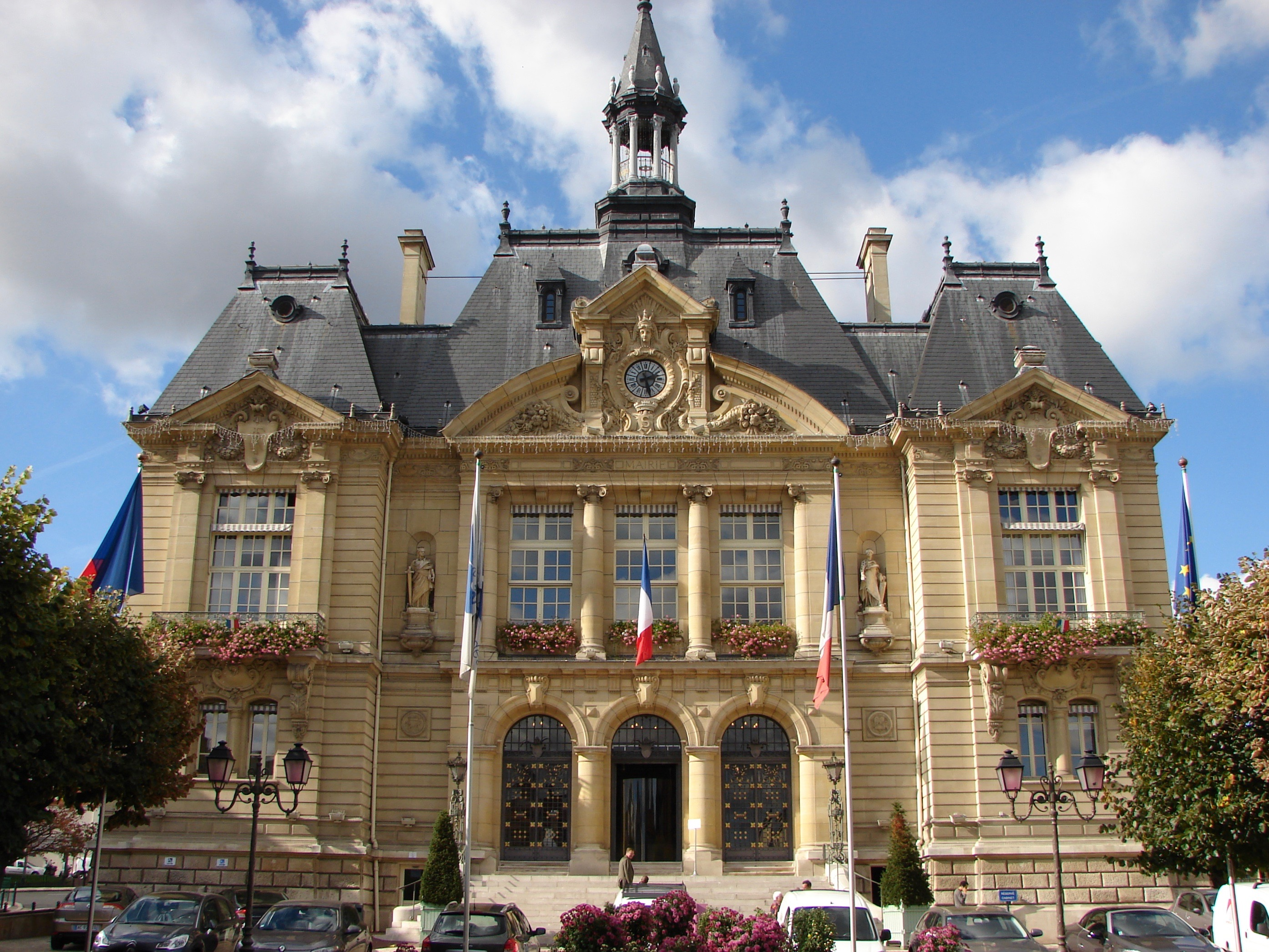
- The Hôtel de Ville

- Coat of arms

- Location (in red) within Paris inner suburbs
- Location of Suresnes
- Location within France Location within Île-de-France (region)
- Coordinates: 48°52′N 2°13′E
- Country: France
- Region: Île-de-France
- Department: Hauts-de-Seine
- Arrondissement: Nanterre
- Canton: Nanterre-2
- Intercommunality: Grand Paris

Government
  - Mayor (2026–32): Guillaume Boudy (LR)
- Area^{1}: 3.79 km^{2} (1.46 sq mi)
- Elevation: 36 m (118 ft)
- Highest elevation: 162 m (531 ft)
- Lowest elevation: 26 m (85 ft)
- Population (2023): 48,956
  - Density: 12,900/km^{2} (33,500/sq mi)
- Demonym: Suresnois
- Time zone: UTC+01:00 (CET)
  - Summer (DST): UTC+02:00 (CEST)
- INSEE/Postal code: 92073 /92150
- Website: www.suresnes.fr
- ^{1} French Land Register data, which excludes lakes, ponds, glaciers > 1 km^{2} (0.386 sq mi or 247 acres) and river estuaries.

Suresnes (French pronunciation: [syʁɛn]) is a commune in Hauts-de-Seine, in the western inner suburbs of Paris, located 9.3 km (5.8 mi) from the centre of Paris. As of 2023, the population of the commune was 48,956.

Suresnes borders the Bois de Boulogne in the 16th arrondissement of Paris, across the Seine. Its neighbouring communes are Nanterre, Puteaux, Rueil-Malmaison and Saint-Cloud. Suresnes's landmarks include the Mémorial de la France combattante, where an annual ceremony is held on 18 June, as well as Suresnes American Cemetery and Memorial nearby, below Fort Mont-Valérien, in addition to Foch Hospital in the town centre.

The commune is served by Suresnes–Mont-Valérien station on the Transilien network and by two stops on Île-de-France tramway Line 2, all three giving access to the La Défense business district and its RER A, RER E and Paris Métro Line 1 services.

== History ==
Fort Mont-Valérien (along with its Mémorial de la France combattante) is situated in the commune, as is Suresnes American Cemetery and Memorial. Suresnes has an elegant view of Paris and the Eiffel Tower, as does neighbouring Saint-Cloud.

Robert Ormond Maugham, the father of W. Somerset Maugham, built a "country house" in Suresnes around 1883. The house, which still exists at 5 Rue Worth, was described by R.O. Maugham's grandson, Robin Maugham, as being, "very odd indeed – half Swiss chalet and half Japanese, with a projecting roof, stucco walls, and wooden supports for the little balconies." The Hôtel de Ville was completed in 1889.

In 1974 the Spanish Socialist Workers Party held its 26th Congress in Suresnes (it was illegal in Spain under Franco). Felipe González was elected Secretary General, replacing Rodolfo Llopis Ferrándiz. González was from the "reform" wing of the party, and his victory signaled a defeat for the historic and veteran wing of the Party. The direction of the party shifted from the exiles to the young people in Spain who had not fought in the Spanish Civil War.

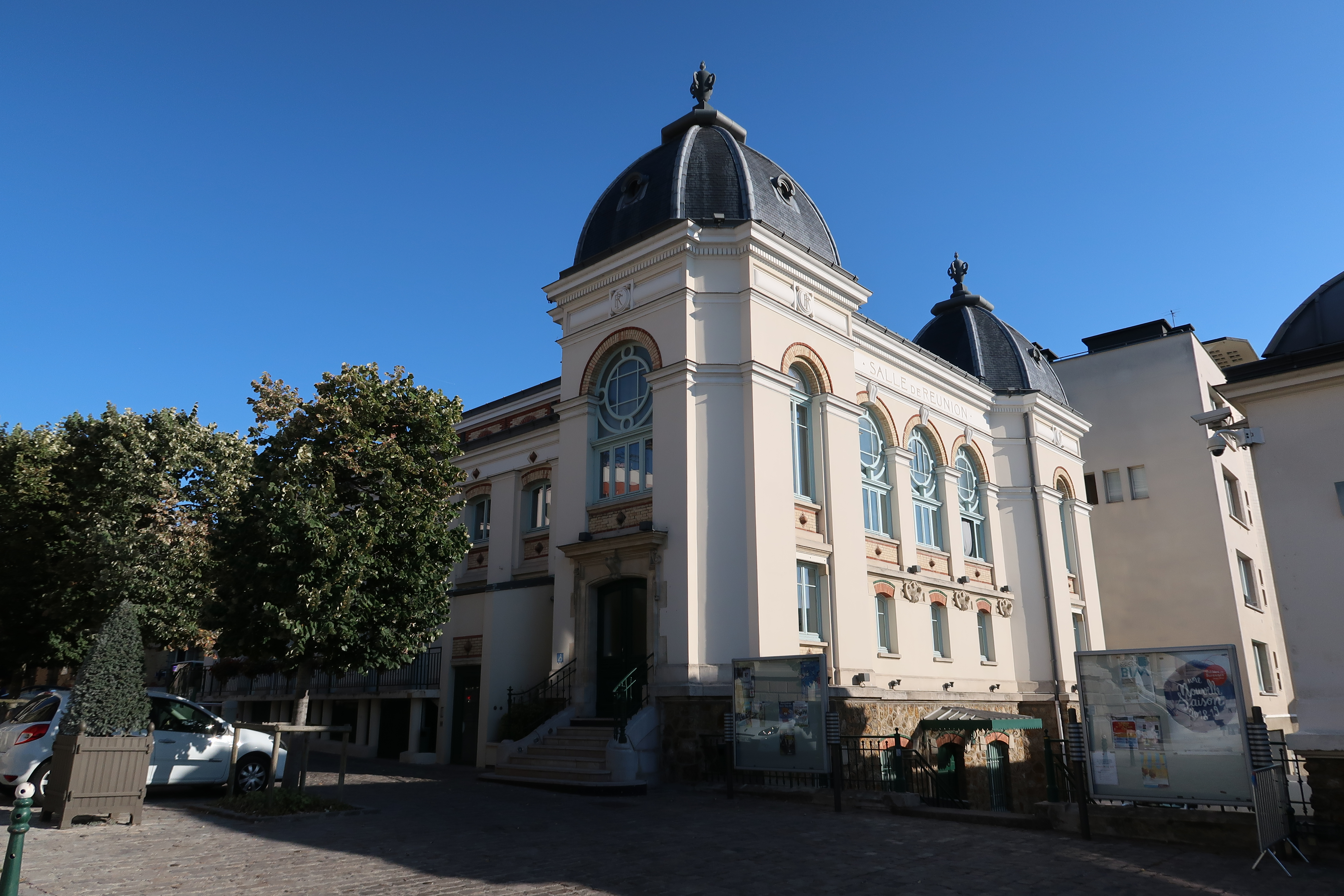
Salle des fêtes

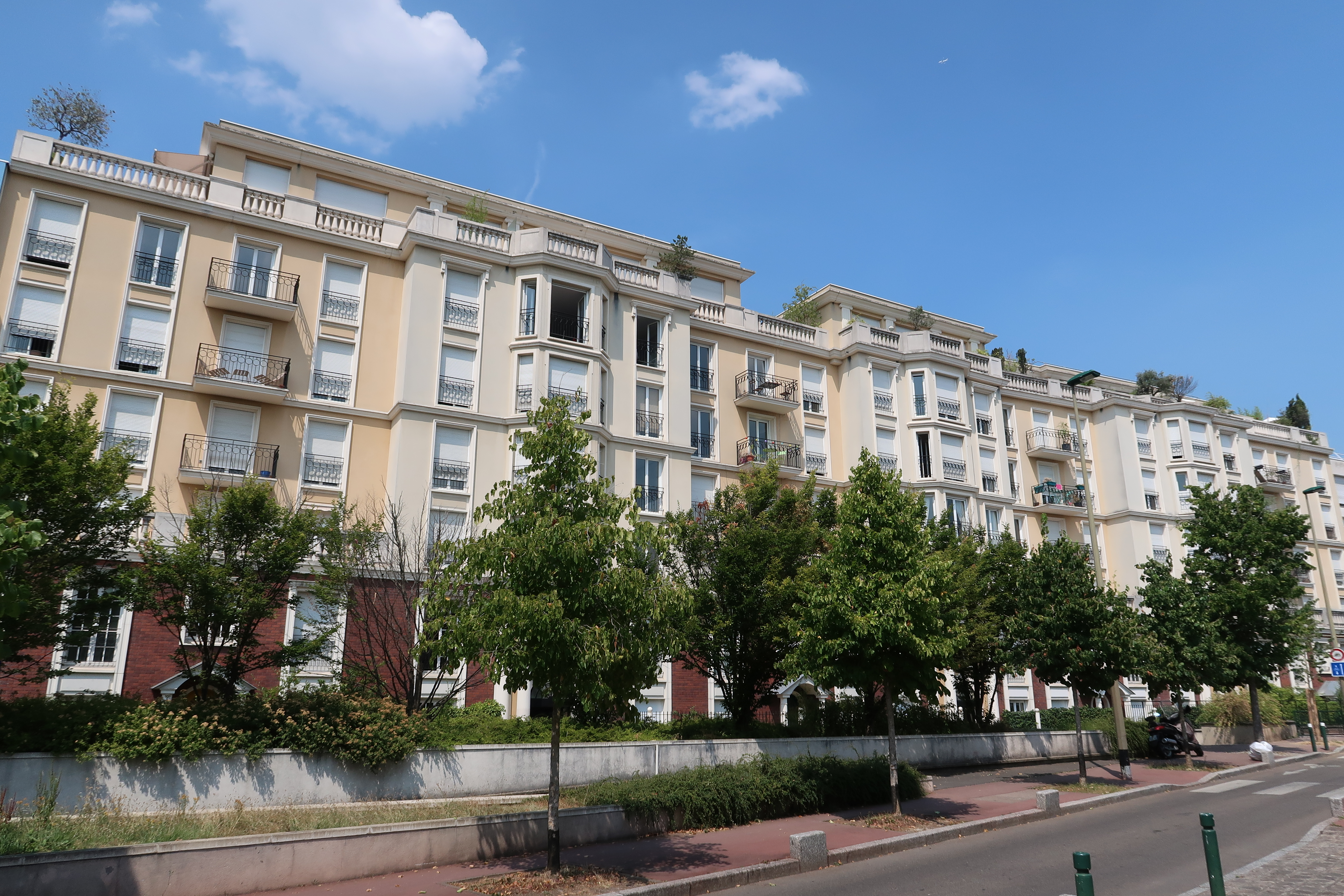
Town centre

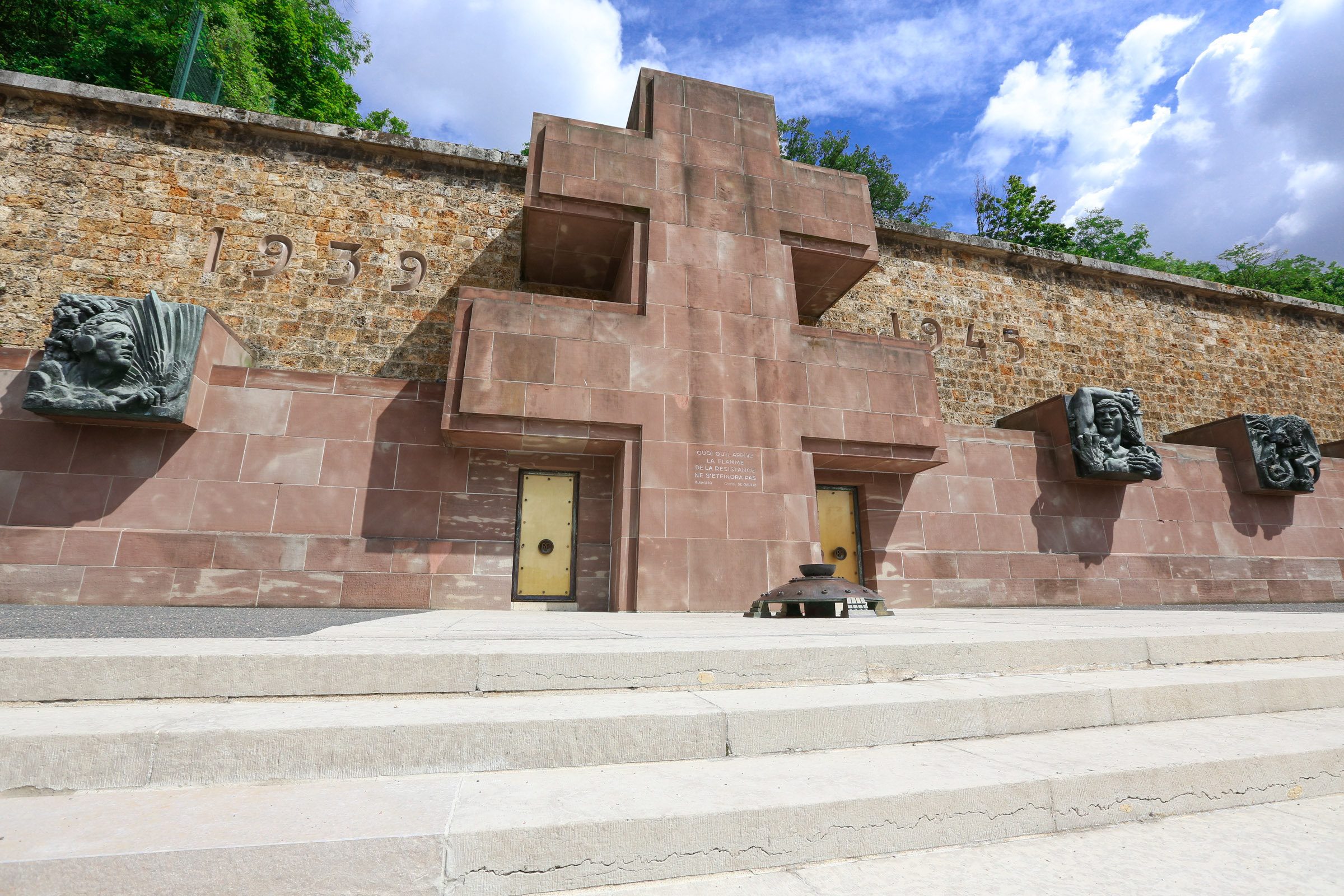
Mémorial de la France combattante, featuring a Cross of Lorraine

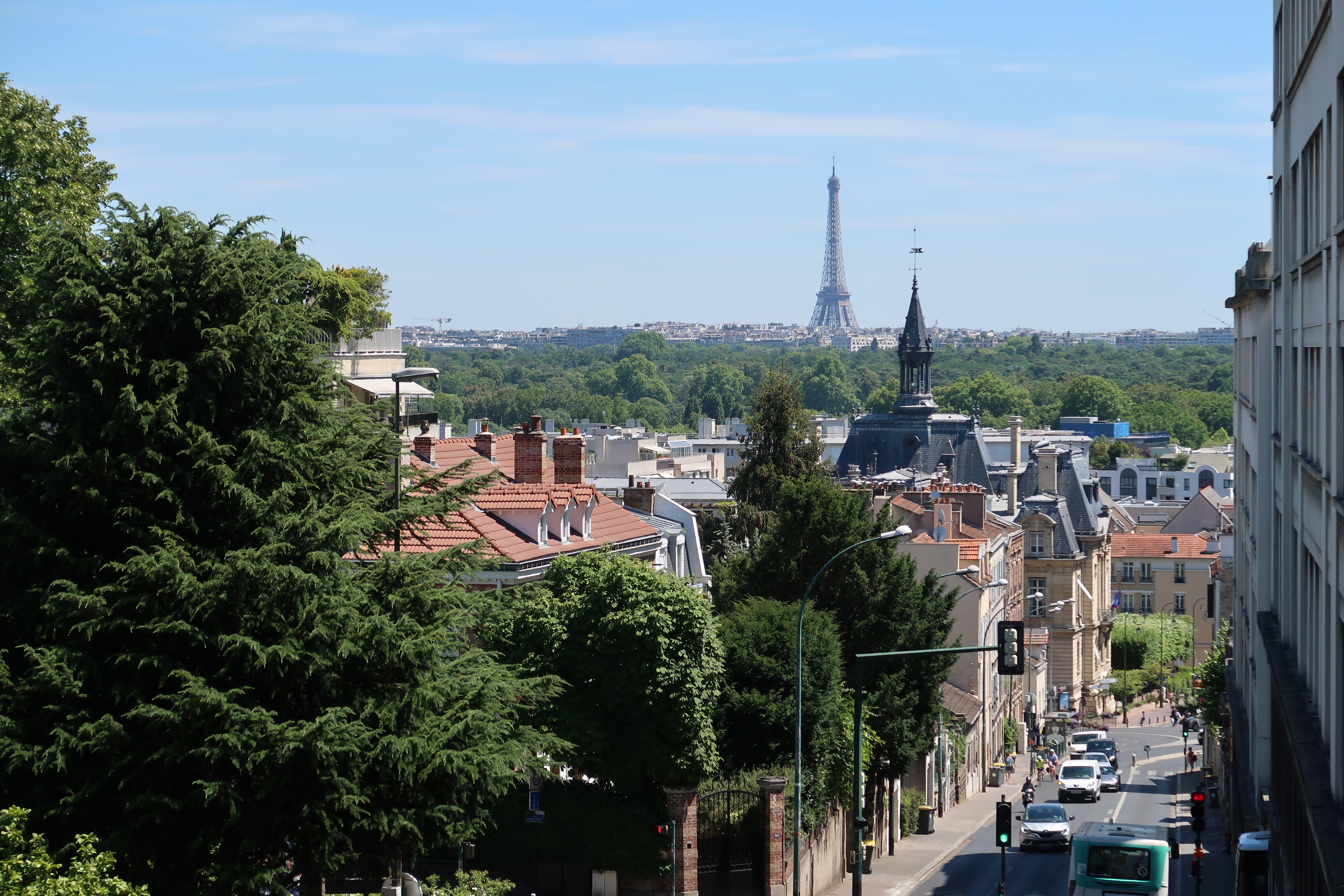
A view of Paris from Lower Suresnes (Bas de Suresnes)

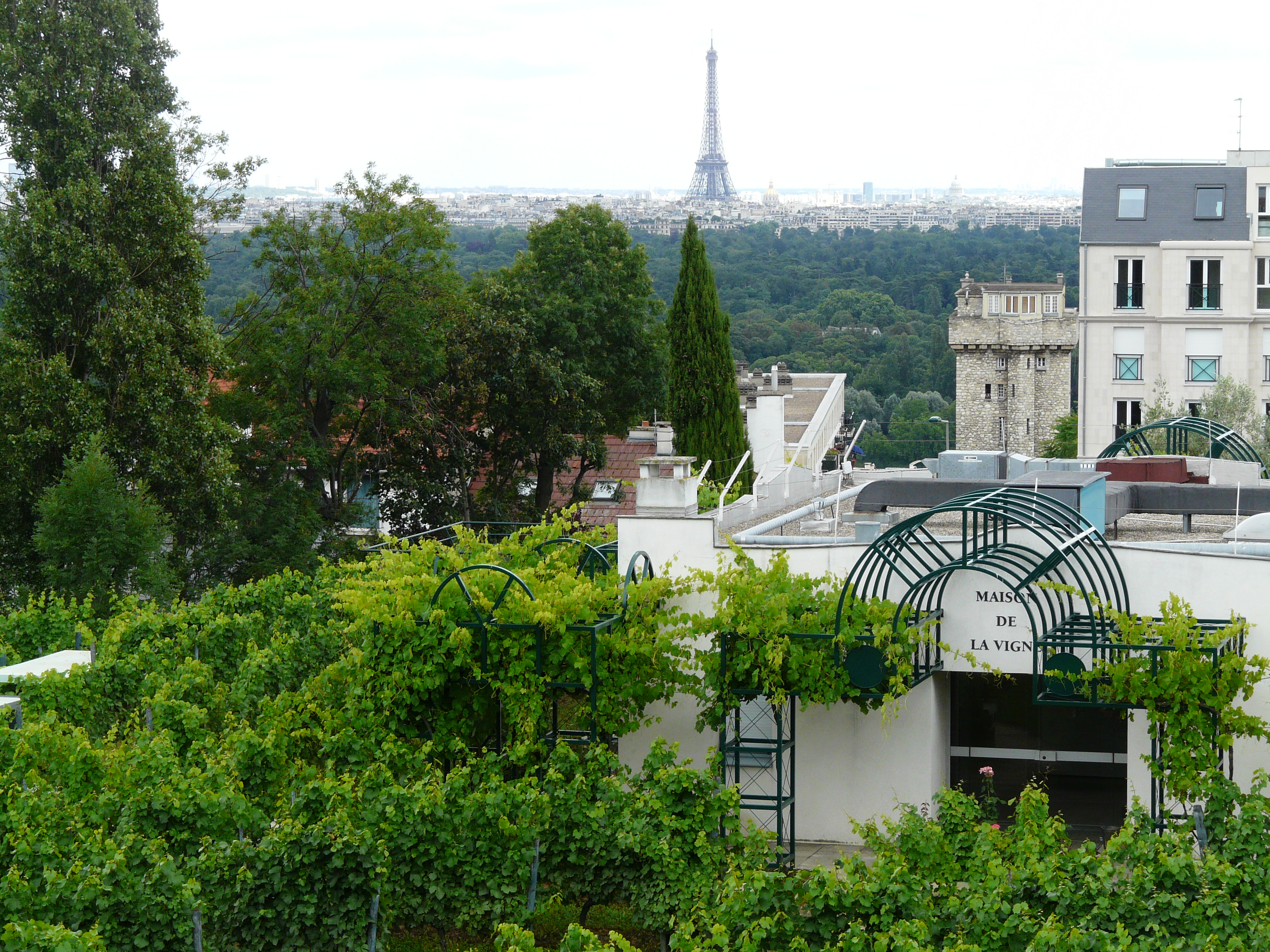
A view of Paris from Upper Suresnes (Hauts de Suresnes)

== Demographics ==
Historical population

Year	Pop.	±% p.a.
1793	1,470	—
1800	1,385	−0.85%
1806	1,427	+0.50%
1821	1,322	−0.51%
1831	1,441	+0.87%
1836	1,765	+4.14%
1841	1,953	+2.04%
1846	2,159	+2.03%
1851	2,032	−1.21%
1856	3,216	+9.62%
1861	4,546	+7.17%
1866	4,515	−0.14%
1872	6,477	+6.20%
1876	6,149	−1.29%
1881	7,011	+2.66%
1886	7,683	+1.85%
1891	8,404	+1.81%
1896	9,057	+1.51%
1901	11,225	+4.39%

Year	Pop.	±% p.a.
1906	13,660	+4.00%
1911	16,248	+3.53%
1921	19,117	+1.64%
1926	22,209	+3.04%
1931	27,065	+4.03%
1936	32,018	+3.42%
1946	32,182	+0.05%
1954	37,149	+1.81%
1962	39,100	+0.64%
1968	40,616	+0.64%
1975	37,537	−1.12%
1982	35,187	−0.92%
1990	35,998	+0.29%
1999	39,706	+1.10%
2007	44,738	+1.50%
2012	47,263	+1.10%
2017	48,264	+0.42%
2023	48,956	+0.24%

Source: EHESS and INSEE (1968–2023)

== Transport ==
Suresnes is served by Suresnes–Mont-Valérien station on the Transilien La Défense and Transilien Paris-Saint-Lazare suburban rail lines. It is also served by Île-de-France tramway Line 2, which stops twice in the commune, at Belvédère and Suresnes Longchamp.

The Pont de Suresnes carries the Allée de Longchamp, one of the main traffic arteries, from the Bois de Boulogne over the Seine into the western suburbs of Paris.

== Museums ==
Suresnes has the Musée d'histoire urbaine et sociale de Suresnes dedicated to social urban. In 2027 the Terrorism Memorial Museum will open.

== People from Suresnes ==
See: Category:People from Suresnes

The following people have been associated with Suresnes:

- Shapour Bakhtiar (1914–1991), 45th Prime Minister of Iran, fought in the French Resistance, lived in Suresnes.
- Gustave Paul Cluseret (1823-1900), French Army Officer who also served as a Brigadier General for the U. S. Army during the American Civil War
- Karine Ferri (1982), French model and television presenter, born in Suresnes.
- Blanche Gardin (1977), French comedian and actress, born in Suresnes.
- Julie Gayet (1972), French actress and film producer, partner of former President François Hollande, born in Suresnes.
- Kenny Kadji (born 1988), Cameroonian basketball player in the Israeli Basketball Premier League
- Noor Inayat Khan (1914–1944) lived in Suresnes with her family in a large estate known as Fazal Manzil from 1920 to 1940 during which time she studied at the Sorbonne. Noor Inayat Khan later returned to France as an agent of the Special Operations Executive, spying for the Allied cause in occupied France. She was executed by the Germans and posthumously awarded the Croix de Guerre and George Cross.
- Luc Lang (1956), French writer, born in Suresnes.
- Virginie Lemoine (born 1961), French actress and comedian, born in Suresnes.
- Marguerite Naseau (1594–1633), French nun and the first member of Daughters of Charity
- Vincent Peillon (1960), French politician, born in Suresnes.
- Stéphane Plaza (1970), French television presenter and real estate agent, born in Suresnes.
- Jérôme Rivière (1964), French politician, born in Suresnes.
- Alexis Salatko (1959), French writer, born in Suresnes.
- Michaël Youn (1973), French comedian and singer, born in Suresnes.
- Nathalie Stutzmann (1965), French contralto and conductor, born in Suresnes.
- Irène Marie Jacob (1966), French-Swiss actress, born in Suresnes.
- Andrew Prine, American actor, died (2022) in Suresnes aged of 86 years old.

== Education ==
There are 16 public preschools and 12 public elementary schools in Suresnes. There is one elementary school which has Noor Inayat Khan as its namesake.

There are three public junior high schools (collèges): Hubert Germain, Henri Sellier, and Emile Zola.

Technician degrees are available at the Lycée Paul-Langevin. Suresnes also hosts the headquarters of the Institut national supérieur de formation et de recherche pour l'éducation des jeunes handicapés et les enseignements adaptés (INS HEA), a public college in the fields of disability. A campus of Skema Business School is located in the city.

== Twin towns / sister cities ==
Suresnes is twinned with:

- Colmenar Viejo, Spain
- Göttingen, Germany
- Hackney, England
- Hannoversch Münden, Germany
- Holon, Israel
- Kragujevac, Serbia
- Villach, Austria

== See also ==
- Communes of the Hauts-de-Seine department
- Fort Mont-Valérien
- Garden City of Suresnes
- Suresnes American Cemetery and Memorial
- History of Suresnes
