= Musée d'histoire urbaine et sociale de Suresnes =

Museum in Suresnes, France

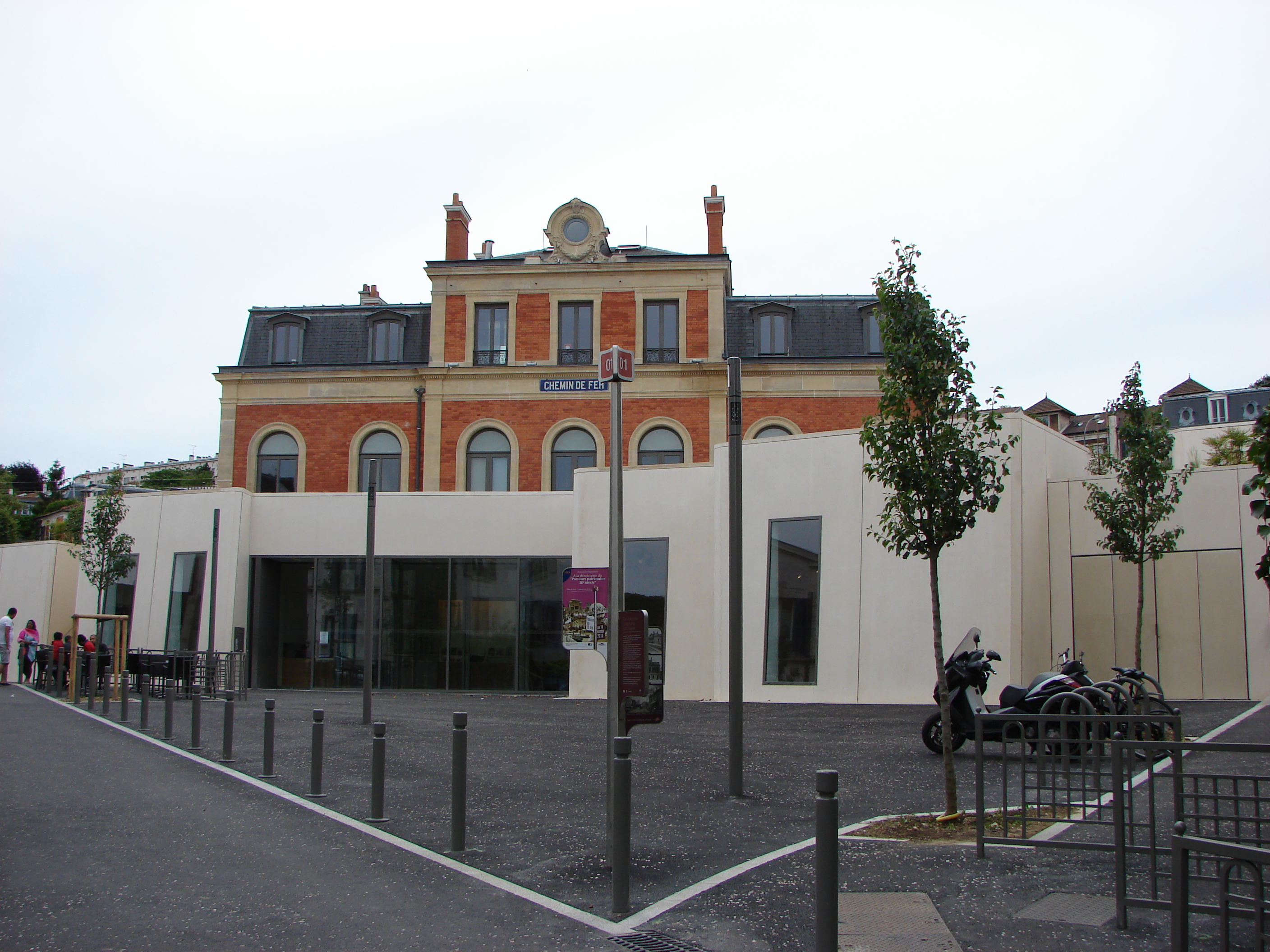
- Musée d'histoire urbaine et sociale de Suresnes entrance
- Interactive fullscreen map
- Established: 1890
- Location: 1 Place de la gare de Suresnes-Longchamp; 92150 Suresnes; France
- Coordinates: 48°52′05″N 2°13′17″E
- Type: Museum
- Public transit access: Suresnes-Longchamp station
- Website: mus.suresnes.fr

The Musée d'histoire urbaine et sociale de Suresnes (English: Suresnes Urban and Social History Museum) is a museum of France installed since June 2013 in the old Suresnes - Longchamp train station building.

Presenting the evolution of the city, it is particularly focused on the social urban planning of the 1920s and 1930s, of which the garden city and the Outdoor School are the most significant examples.

The museum was initially budgeted at a cost of €8.3 million for a total area of approximately 1,300 square meters, including the creation of the 220 square meter extension intended for temporary exhibitions. Its final cost is 10 million euros.

== See also ==
- History of Suresnes
