= Hôtel de Ville, Suresnes =

Town hall in Suresnes, France

Hôtel de Ville
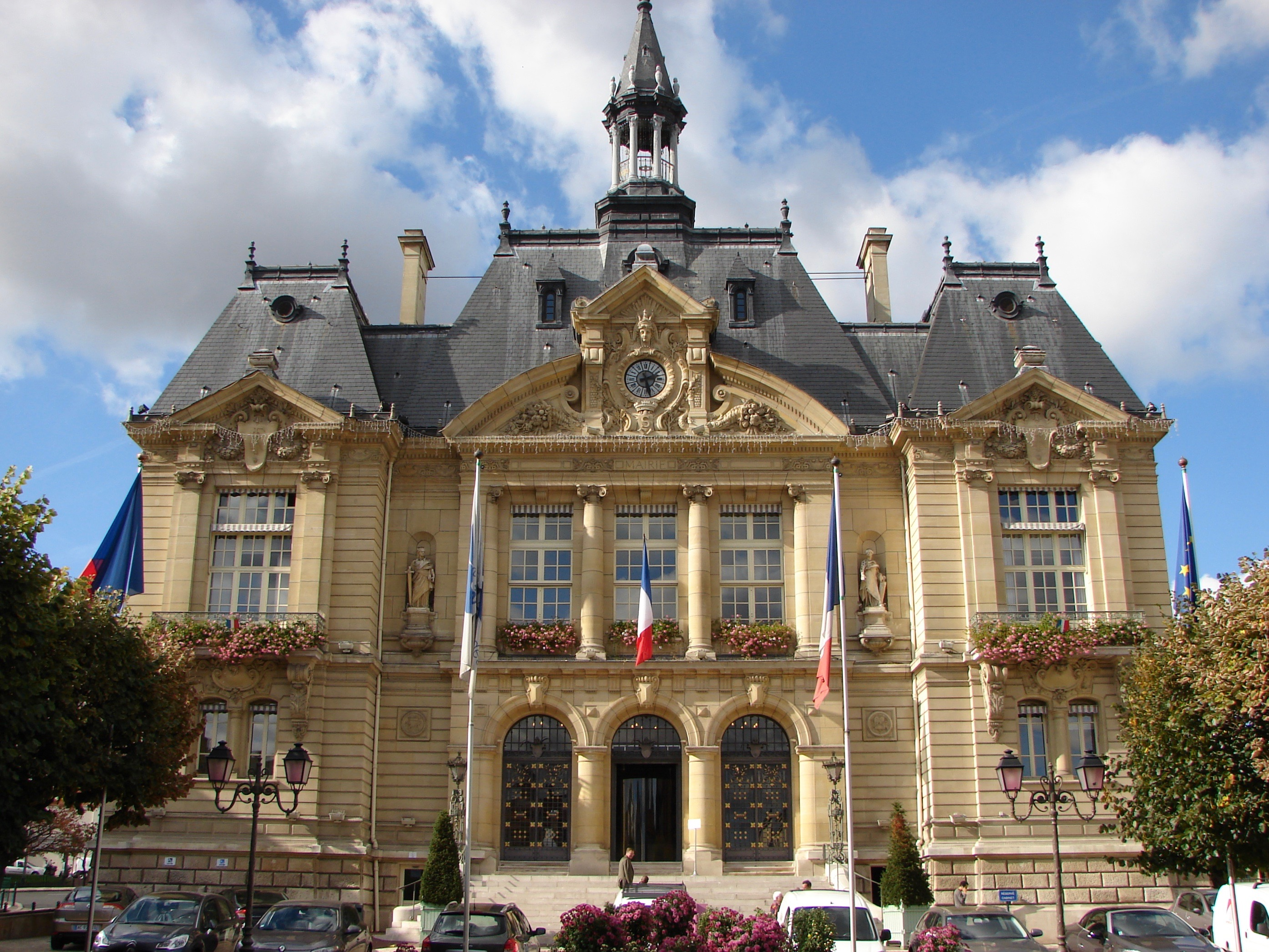
- The main frontage of the Hôtel de Ville in October 2011
- Interactive map of the Hôtel de Ville area

General information
- Type: City hall
- Architectural style: Neoclassical style
- Location: Suresnes, France
- Coordinates: 48.8711°N 2.2251°E
- Completed: 1889

Design and construction
- Architect: Jean Bréasson

The Hôtel de Ville (French pronunciation: [otɛl də vil], City Hall) is a municipal building in Suresnes, Hauts-de-Seine, in the western suburbs of Paris, standing on Rue Carnot. It has been included on the Inventaire général des monuments by the French Ministry of Culture since 1995.

== History ==
The first town hall was located at the corner of Place Henri-IV and Rue Émile-Zola and was used by the mayor, Martin-François Bougault, and other local officials from 1789 to 1792. The second town hall was described as "flottante" (floating) and was probably the home of the mayor of the day. The third town hall was the local clergy house occupied from 1795, and the fourth town hall was a house known as "La Fouillée" which served as the home of the council, as well as the local school, for much of the first half of the 19th century. The council then acquired the former home of the physicist, Hippolyte Fizeau, just below Fort Mont-Valérien, for use as its fifth town hall, in 1855. During the Franco-Prussian War in 1870, the council was temporarily accommodated in the comparative safety of its sixth town hall at No. 31 Rue d'Anjou in central Paris.

In February 1885, the council decided to commission a more substantial building, its seventh town hall. The site it selected was occupied by a pharmacist, Sieur Grignon. The foundation stone for the new building was laid by the mayor, Jules Arthur Guillaumet, on 15 March 1887. It was designed by Jean Bréasson in the neoclassical style, built in ashlar stone at a cost of FFr465,000 and was officially opened in the presence of the prefect of the Department of the Seine, Eugène Poubelle, on 2 December 1889.

The design involved a symmetrical main frontage of five bays facing onto Rue Carnot with the end bays projected forward as pavilions. The central section of three bays featured a short flight of steps leading up to three round headed openings flanked by columns with imposts supporting voussoirs and keystones. On the first floor, there were three casement windows flanked by Ionic order columns supporting a frieze, and a modillioned segmental pediment containing a clock with an ornate surround. Behind the clock, there was a steep roof surmounted by an octagonal lantern. The outer bays were fenestrated by pairs of segmental headed windows on the ground floor, and by casement windows flanked by Ionic order pilasters on the second floor. The outer bays were surmounted by triangular pediments. Internally, the principal room was the Salle des Mariages (wedding hall). The Grand Escalier (grand staircase) was decorated by two large canvases by Jules Ferry.

On 3 June 1940, during the Second World War, the Luftwaffe bombed the town, causing the doors and windows of the town hall to be blown out and the building to remain uninhabitable for the remainder of the war. On 22 June 1941, the mayor, Henri Sellier, was arrested by the Gestapo, held at Royallieu-Compiègne internment camp and subsequently died from an hemiplegic attack. A memorial to commemorate his life was erected in front of the town hall after the war.

== Sources ==
- Hebert, Michel; Noël, Guy (1995). Suresnes. Mémoire en images. Vol. 1. Éditions Alan Sutton.
- Sordes, René (1965). Histoire de Suresnes: Des origines à 1945. Société historique de Suresnes.
