= Marguerite Naseau =

French nun

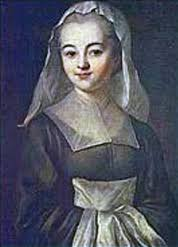
Marguerite Naseau

Marguerite Naseau (July 1594 – February 1633) was a French nun and the first member of Daughters of Charity.

== Biography ==
Marguerite Naseau was born in a peasant family in July 1594 in Suresnes. She did not have formal education. As a self-taught, she started reading by asking help from the passers-by “in learning letters, words, and pronunciation.” She then taught others including the uneducated girls.

In 1630, after she heard the preaching of Vincent de Paul, she approached him to serve in Parisian Confraternity of Charity. She later got his permission to provide charitable works in Paris and around for the needy as she did before in her village.

She played important role along with de Paul and Louise de Marillac in transforming the Parisian Confraternity of Charity into a benevolent organization. The works of Daughters of Charity were expanded on a large scale in terms of its size and coverage. Her practical skills such as “cooking and healing expertise” immensely contributed for the advancement of charitable works of Daughters of Charity. This made her as a model for other members in the organization.

In February 1633, while working among the plague-stricken in Paris, she died of “plague after sharing a bed with a sick girl”.
