= Suresnes-Longchamp station =

Tram station in Suresnes, France

Suresnes-Longchamp
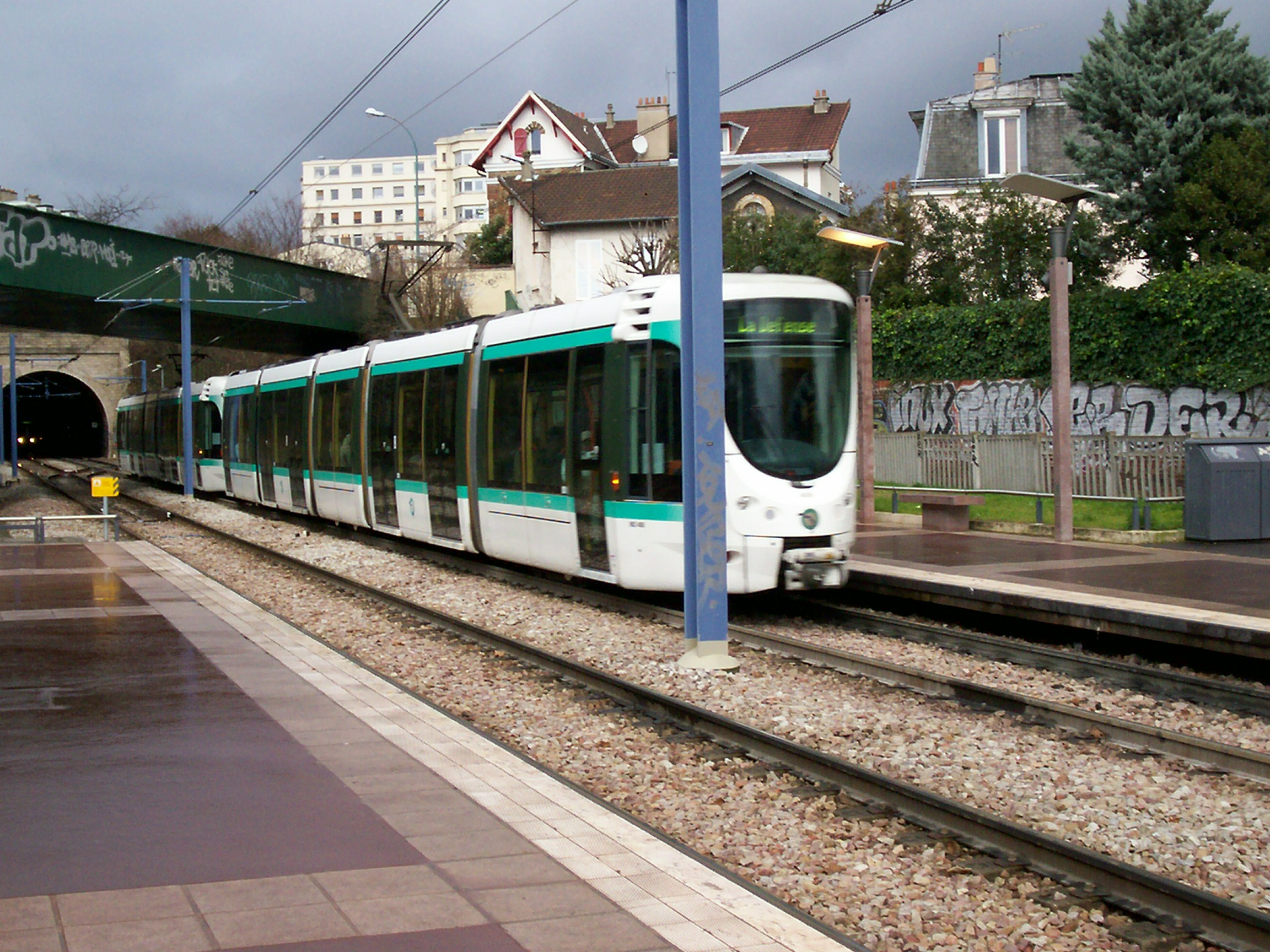

General information
- Location: Suresnes; Île-de-France; France
- Coordinates: 48°52′06″N 2°13′17″E
- System: Tram station
- Owner: RATP
- Operator: RATP

History
- Opened: 2 July 1997
Location
- Location within Paris and inner ring

Suresnes-Longchamp station is a former French railway station on the line from Puteaux to Issy-Plaine (Moulineaux line), which became a tram station on line 2 of the Île-de-France tramway (line T2). It is located in the territory of the commune of Suresnes, in the department of Hauts-de-Seine, in the Île-de-France region. It is also close to the Longchamp racecourse (located in Paris).

The station was put into service in 1889 and closed in 1993. It was transformed into a tram station and reopened, like the line, in 1997. Its passenger building was repurposed; it houses the Musée d'histoire urbaine et sociale de Suresnes, opened in 2013.

Having become a tram station of the Régie Autonome des Transports Parisiens (RATP), it is served by the trains of line T2.
