= Garden City station =

Garden City station may refer to:

- Garden City bus station, a TransLink bus station in Upper Mount Gravatt, Queensland, Australia
- Garden City station (Kansas), an Amtrak station in Garden City, Kansas, US
- Garden City station (LIRR), a Long Island Rail Road station in Garden City, New York, US
- Merillon Avenue station, formerly Garden City station, a Long Island Rail Road station in Garden City, New York, US

== See also ==
- Garden City (disambiguation)
