= Garden City Radio 89.9 =

- Port Harcourt; Nigeria
- Broadcast area: Port Harcourt, Owerri, Aba, Uyo
- Frequency: 89.9 MHz
- Branding: GC Radio 89.9

Programming
- Language: English
- Format: Urban adult contemporary

Ownership
- Owner: Rivers State government

History
- First air date: June 2011

Technical information
- Transmitter coordinates: 4°46′47″N 7°0′31″E

Links
- Website: http://www.gardencityfm899.com/

Garden City Radio 89.9 is a state owned commercial FM radio station in Port Harcourt, Nigeria, which broadcasts across Rivers State from studios in Old GRA. The station's signal strength reaches about four surrounding states including Abia, Akwa Ibom, Bayelsa and Imo. Its target audience are people from ages 25–54.

Garden City Radio airs an urban adult contemporary format and is one of the high-ranking stations in Port Harcourt. The station originally launched its digital services on 96.2 in June 2011, followed by a 1 October rebranding move. By December 2011, Garden City's frequency became 89.9 following instructions from the National Broadcasting Commission (NBC).

== See also ==
- List of radio stations in Port Harcourt
