= Langarth Garden Village =

Planned community in Cornwall, England

Coordinates: 50°16′06″N 5°07′04″W

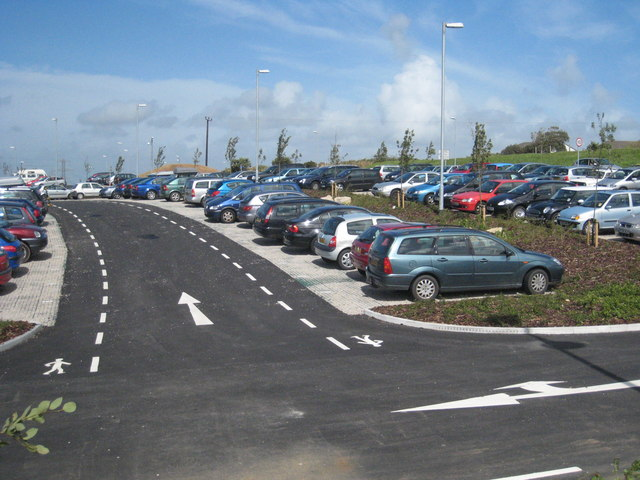
The park and ride at Langarth

Langarth Garden Village is a planned community near Truro, Cornwall, England.

== History ==
In 2021, planning permission was granted for 3,550 homes on the edge of Truro. At completion Langarth Garden Village will house 10,000 people.

The plans to build the village are supported by Cornwall Council. The council has invested £160 million into the project. The homes are proposed to be built over a period of 20 to 25 years. The project is one of 14 garden villages proposed by the government. The plans also include parks and public open spaces, cultural facilities and a mix of community buildings. This includes a proposed Langarth Forest School. The land formerly earmarked for the Stadium for Cornwall was later allocated for the construction of a new Community Sports Hub located at the edge of the Park and Ride, for a home for Truro City Football Club. The Minister of State for Housing Kit Malthouse allocated funds due to the plans including green spaces and natural environments for local communities.

In July 2023, the construction of Fordh Langarth began. The road will link the A390 road through Langarth to the Royal Cornwall Hospital at Treliske.

In January 2025, Cornwall Council said the government had approved a Compulsory Purchase Order (CPO) for land.

== Reception ==
Despite Cornwall having a large shortage of affordable housing, only 35% of the houses will be affordable. Cornwall Council has been criticised for lack of consultation. Current residents of the area are at risk of being displaced.
