= City of Trees (film) =

- Directed by: Brandon Kramer
- Produced by: Lance Kramer
- Cinematography: Brandon Kramer Ellie Walton
- Edited by: Edwin Martinez
- Music by: Brian Satz
- Production company: Meridian Hill Pictures
- Release date: October 25, 2015 (American Conservation Film Festival)
- Running time: 76 minutes
- Country: United States
- Language: English

City of Trees is a 2015 independent documentary film, directed by Brandon Kramer and produced by Meridian Hill Pictures in association with Kartemquin Films and Magic Labs Media. City of Trees follows two years in the life of trainees and directors in the Washington Parks and People DC Green Corps, a green job training program funded by an American Recovery & Reinvestment Act grant. The film takes place primarily in Wards 1, 7 and 8 in Washington, DC. The film premiered at the 2015 American Conservation Film Festival (Audience Choice Winner) on October 5, 2015 and on the PBS/World Channel series America ReFramed on April 19, 2016.
