= Garden City of Suresnes =

- Garden city
- Cité-jardin de Suresnes
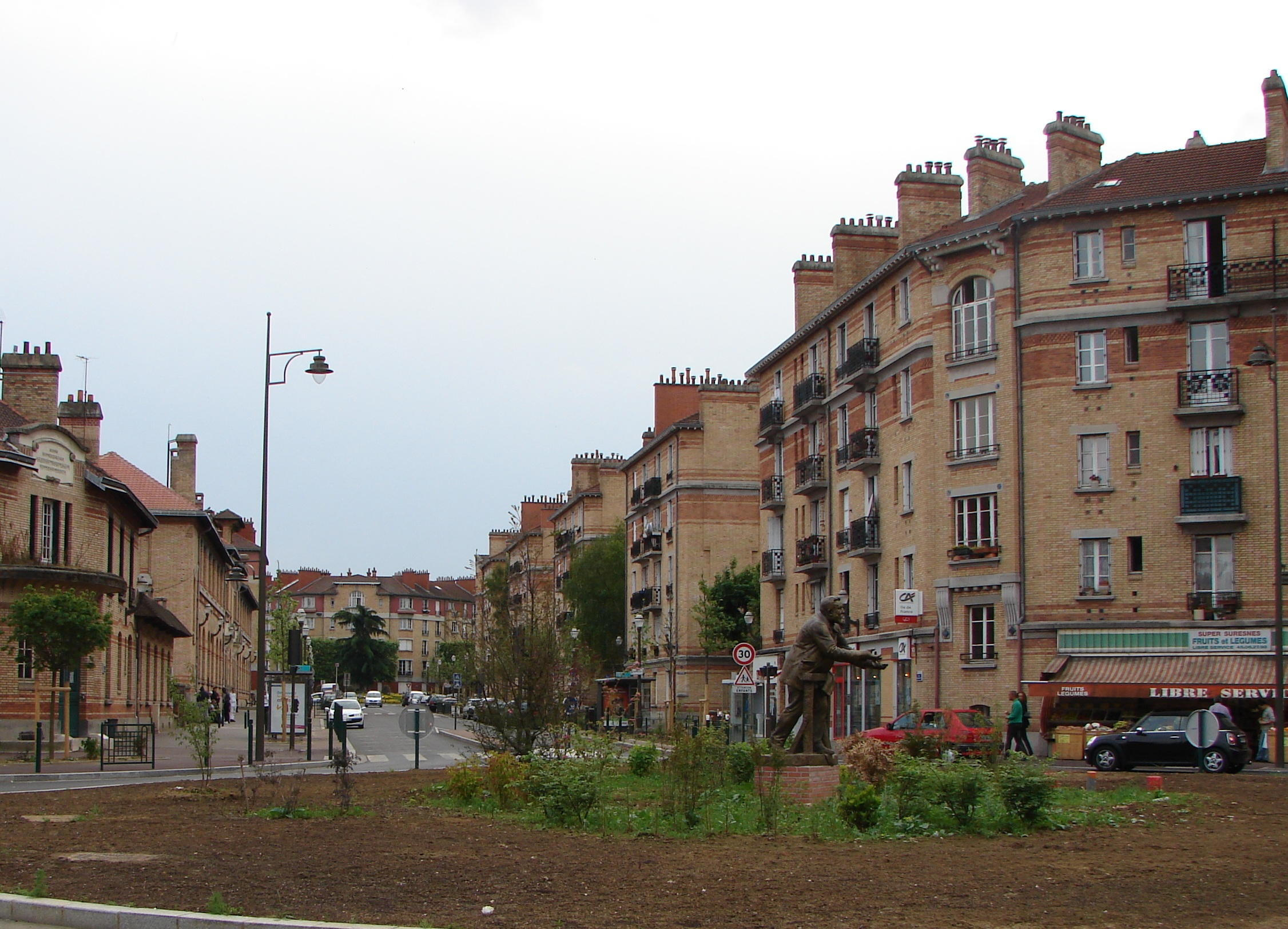

- Location within Île-de-France (region) Location within France
- Coordinates: 48°51′46″N 2°12′16″E
- Country: France
- Region: Île-de-France
- Department: Hauts-de-Seine
- Arrondissement: Nanterre
- Commune: Suresnes

Area
  - Total: 30 ha (74 acres)

The Garden City of Suresnes is one of the largest garden cities in the region of Île-de-France. The city, built from 1921, is located between the Saint-Cloud racetrack and Mont-Valérien, on the Fouilleuse plateau, overlooking the Seine. Built in Suresnes, in the Hauts-de-Seine department, this garden city was created by architects Alexandre Maistrasse, Julien Quoniam and Félix Dumail, on the initiative of mayor Henri Sellier, mainly from 1921 and 1939 and after the war until 1956. It has approximately 3,300 housing units, including 170 pavilions, as well as numerous facilities (theater, schools, shower-baths, residence for the elderly, housing for singles, places of worship and shops).

== History ==
=== Planning and naming ===
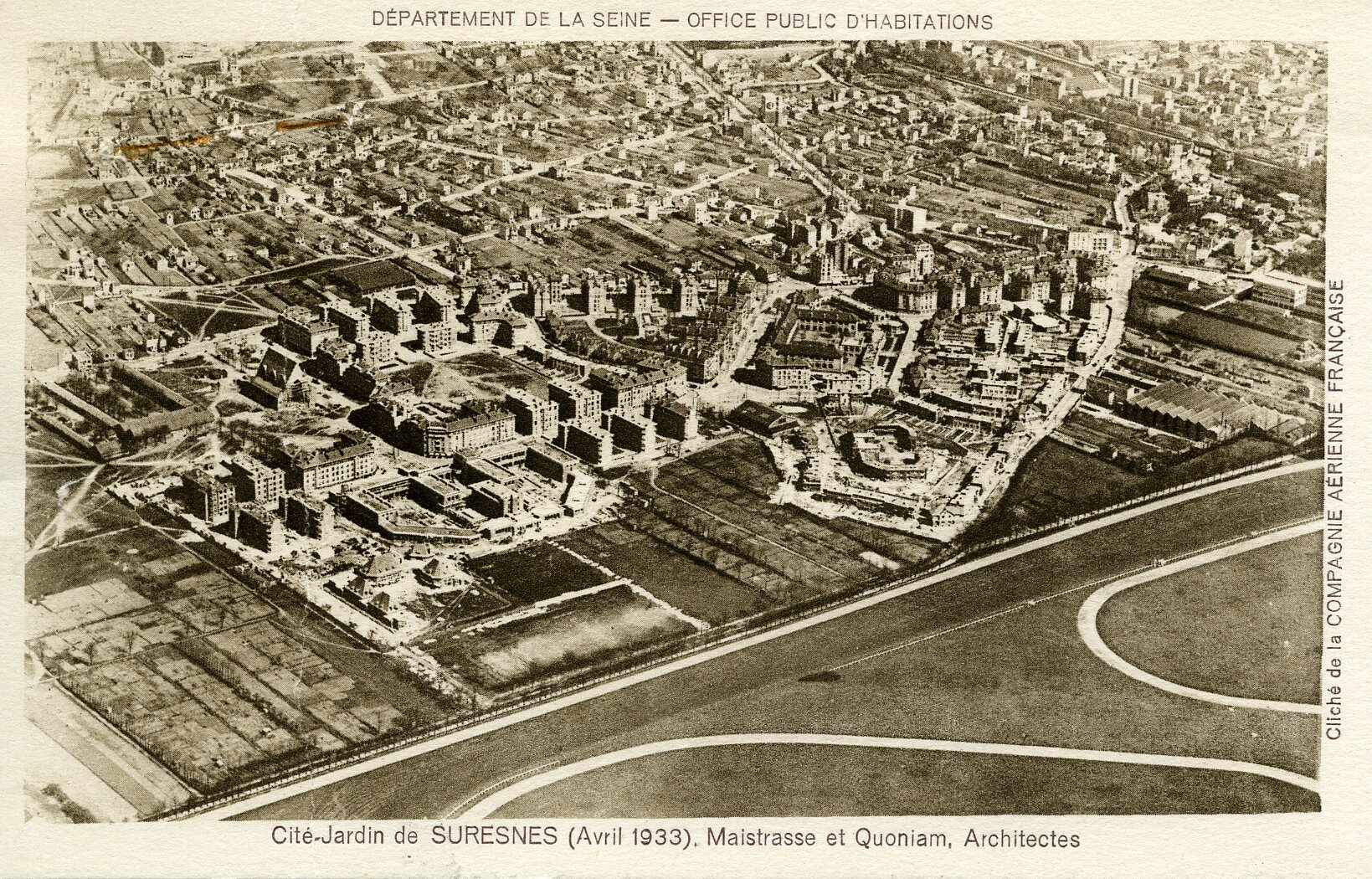
Aerial view in 1933; the southern part is still under construction.

In 1915, the Office des Habitation à Bon Marché(transl. Office of Affordable Housing) or HBM of the Seine department, headed by the mayor of the industrial city of Suresnes Henri Sellier, decided to build an architectural ensemble to accommodate the city's 8,000 to 10,000 inhabitants, many of whom were workers in the city's numerous factories. The chosen site was a 30 hectare area on an agricultural plateau located on the edge of the Rueil-Malmaison commune. The project provided for the coexistence of four-storey apartment buildings and individual pavilions. Alexandre Maistrasse was in charge of the works, assisted by Julien Quoniam from 1927. From 1938, Félix Dumail was in charge of site. Among the collaborators of Henri Sellier who participated in the creation of the garden city, there were two notable women: town planner Berthe Leymarie (born in 1876), the then director of the HBM and a 'visiting nurse' who defended a thesis on the subject in 1923 and worked particularly in the social aspect of these sets, as well as Georgette Le Campion, commonly called Géo (born in 1880), graduate of the Beaux-Arts de Paris and professor of drawing in the schools of the garden city of Suresnes, who produced for them several educational frescoes emphasizing hygiene and civic education.

The first stone was laid in 1921. 4/5th of the inhabitants live in apartment buildings, while the pavilions have a garden at the back. There are several categories of accommodation (in relation to the number of rooms and amenities), the rent of which varies.

The choice of street names for the garden city was made according to the following perspective, as expressed by the mayor to the municipal council of March 22, 1932: “The municipality wanted to pay homage to the thinkers and statesmen of all religions and all nationalities who, over the centuries until our tragic time, have held out to humanity the torch which should guide it towards final peace and the brotherhood of people." The streets are named after the Duke of Sully, Hugo Grotius, William Penn, the abbé de Saint-Pierre, Romain Rolland, Jean Jaurès, Léon Bourgeois, Paul Henri Balleut, Former US President Woodrow Wilson, Frank Billings Kellogg, Louis Loucheur (many Suresnois (residents of Suresnes) benefiting from his law to build pavilions) and Gustav Stresemann. He also decided to give the names of plants and flowers for certain streets, to keep the historical name of La Fouilleuse (transl. The Excavator) as well as that of the crossroads of Croix-du-Roy (transl. King's Cross), thus respecting the heritage of Suresnes.

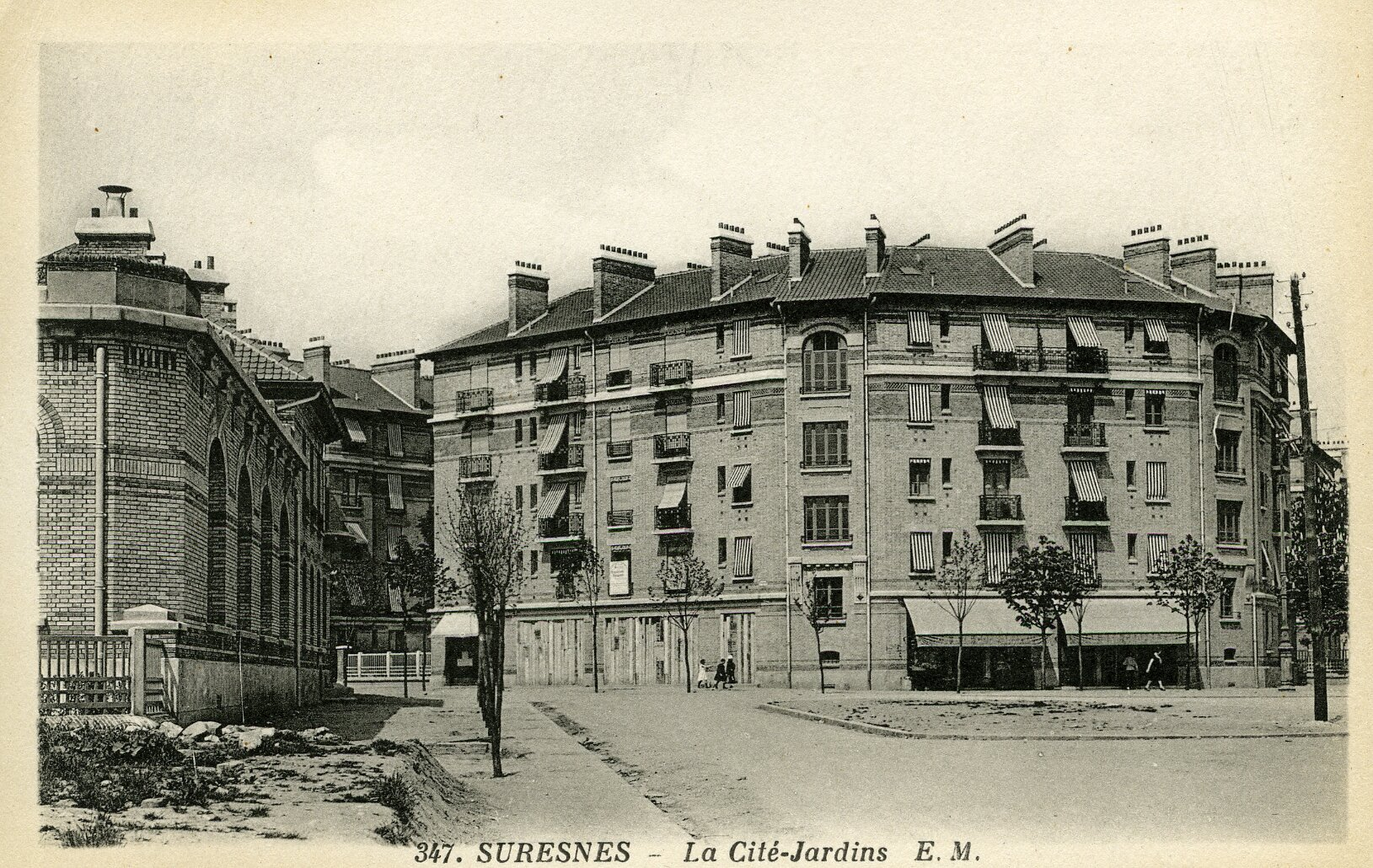
Place Jean-Jaurès in the 1930s.

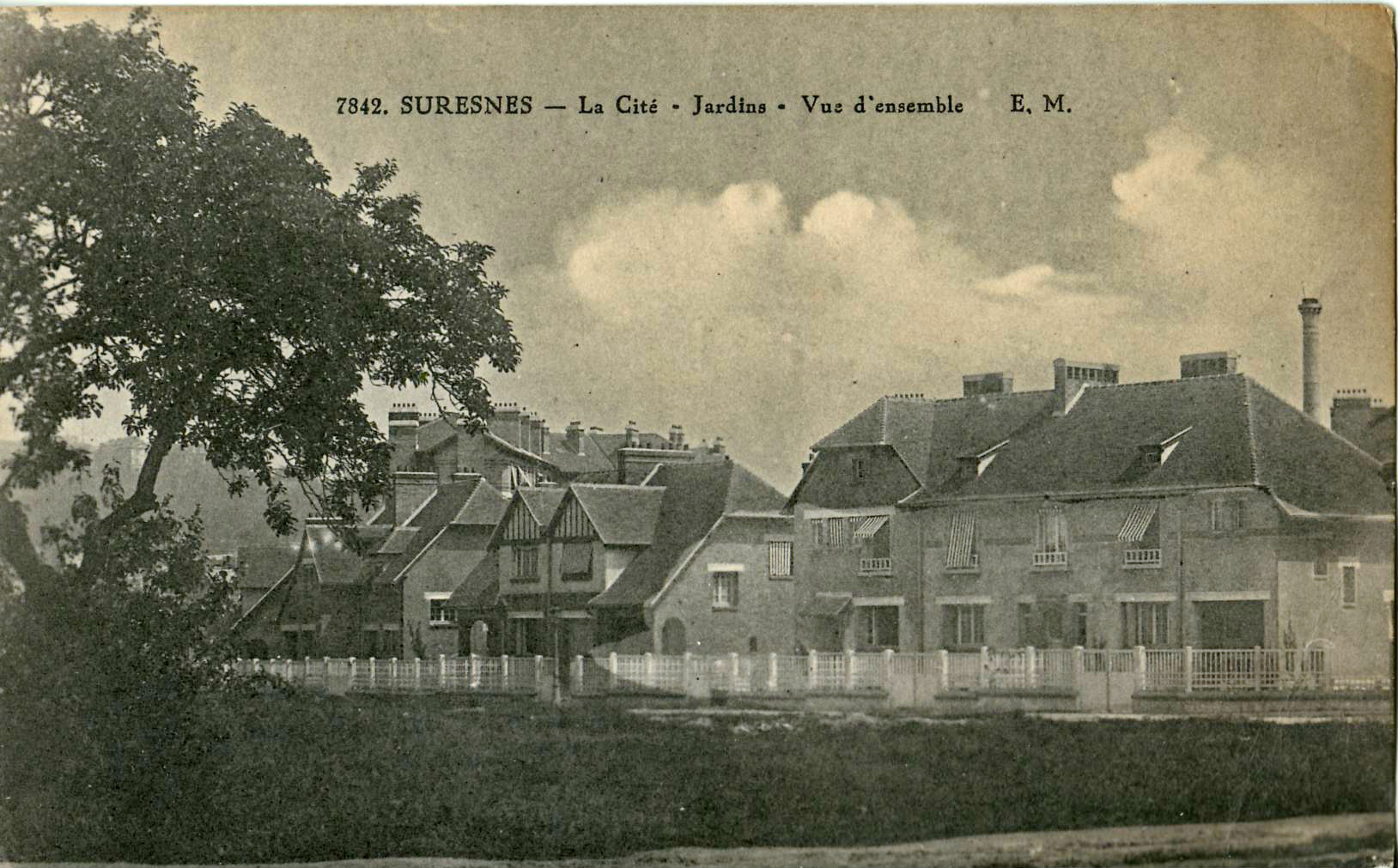
Pavillons of the garden city at the same city.

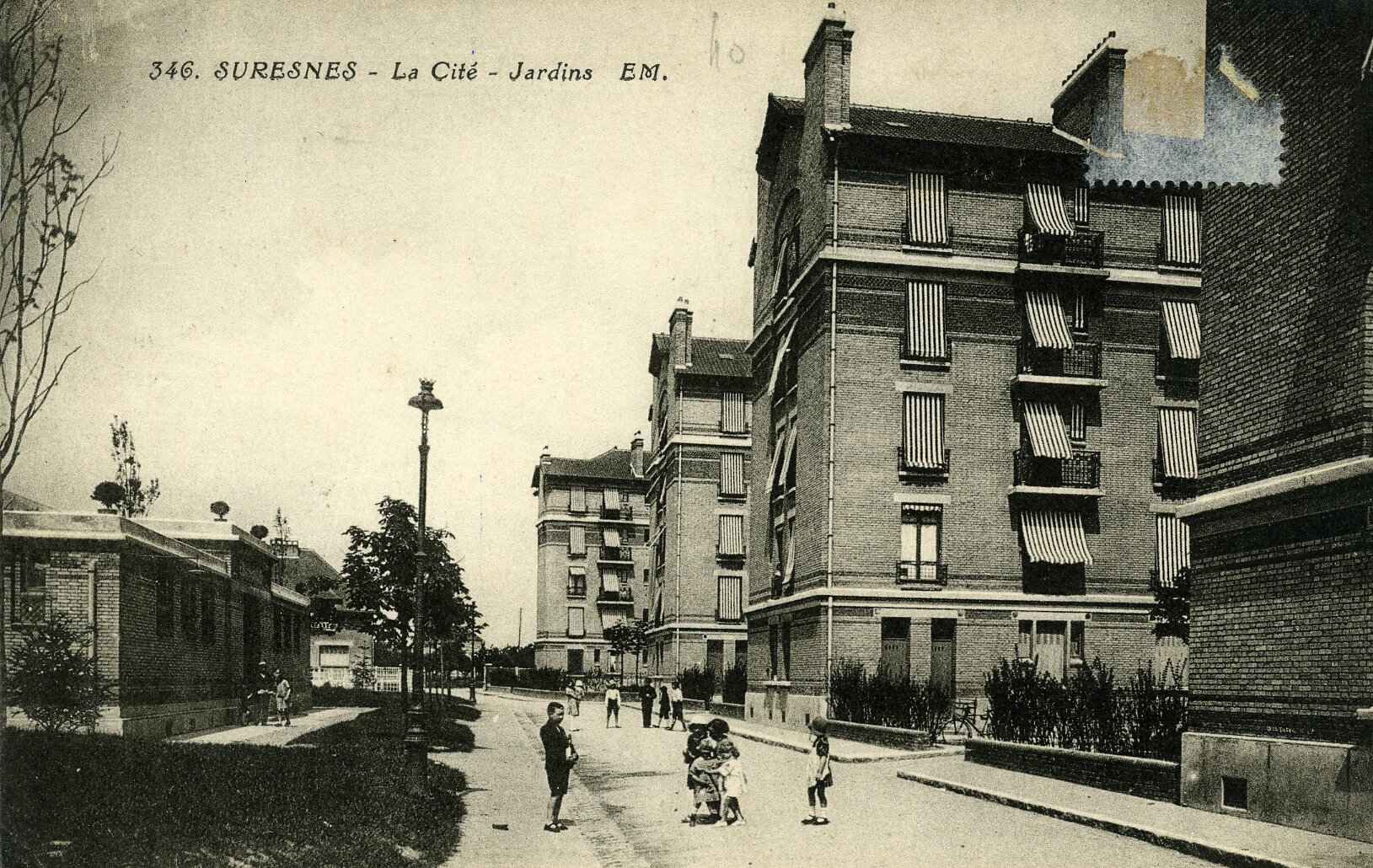
Children playing in front of the wash-house, in 1931.

=== First developments ===
In 1921, while the dwellings were not all equipped with a bathroom, collective shower-baths were built in the first residential islet. Before its rehabilitation between 1985 and 1996, it still had 300 admissions per week. The building is now converted into a Center for Assistance through Work, a medico-social establishment for the professional integration of disabled people. At the end of the 1930s, an infant hygiene and childcare center had also been built in allée des Platanes.

In 1932, the construction of the Église Notre-Dame-de-la-Paix (transl. Our Lady of the Peace church) began, supervised by Dom Paul Bellot. An apartment located on avenue Gustave-Stresemann houses the Israelite place of worship. In 1954, the Protestant temple of Suresnes in avenue d'Estournelles de Constant was built in stone, replacing a wooden hut built in 1947. Squares planted with trees and carpeted with lawns are located in the center of the main islets of the garden city. In the center, the Léon-Bourgeois square extends over 10,200m^{2}.

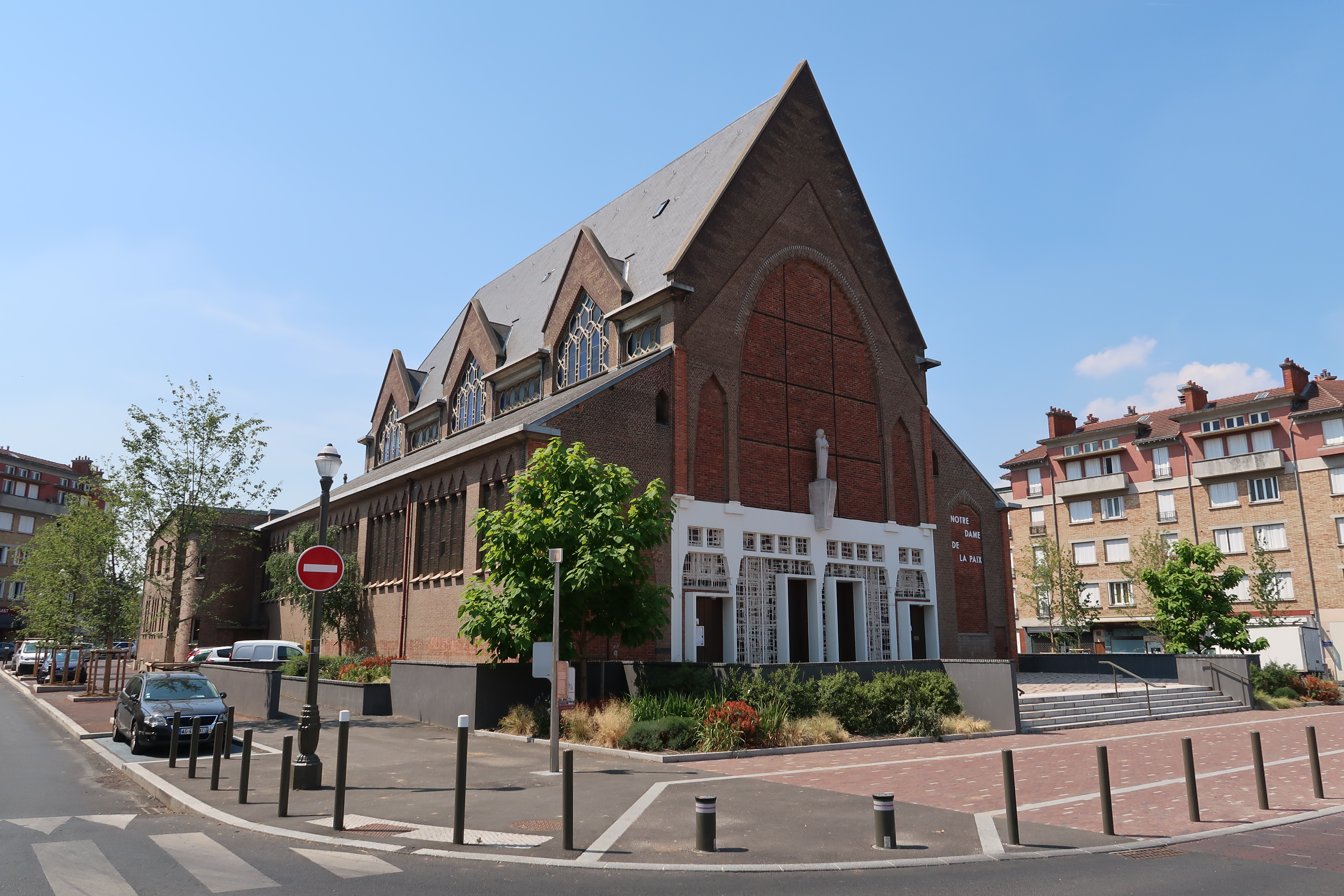
Notre-Dame-de-la-Paix Catholic Church.

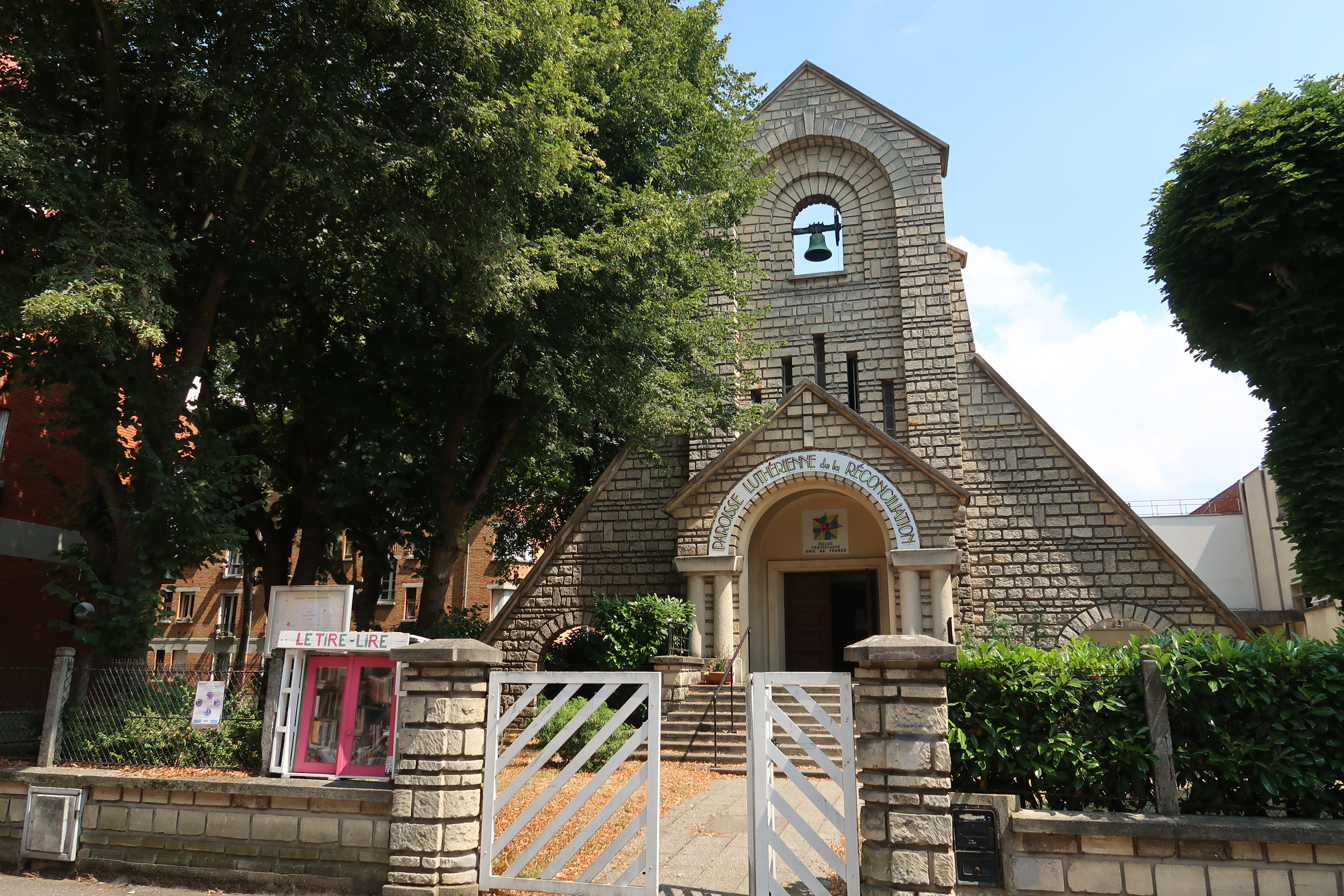
Protestant Church of Reconciliation.

As of 2021, the city was the largest group of social housing in the commune of Suresnes (more than 3000). The rehabilitation undertaken between 1985 and 1996, at the initiative of Christian Dupuy, mayor of Suresnes since 1983, made it possible to bring the apartments up to current standards and to modernize a certain number of public facilities: the Locarno residence (built in 1932, named after the Locarno agreements) for the elderly, the wash-houses, baths and showers, converted into a center for help through work, the hotel for singles transformed into a residence for young people aged 18 to 30, the theatre (Albert-Thomas center, renamed Jean-Vilar theatre), schools, Léon Bourgeois square and Place de la Paix. A neighborhood center, the Sorbiers, was created in the former child hygiene center.

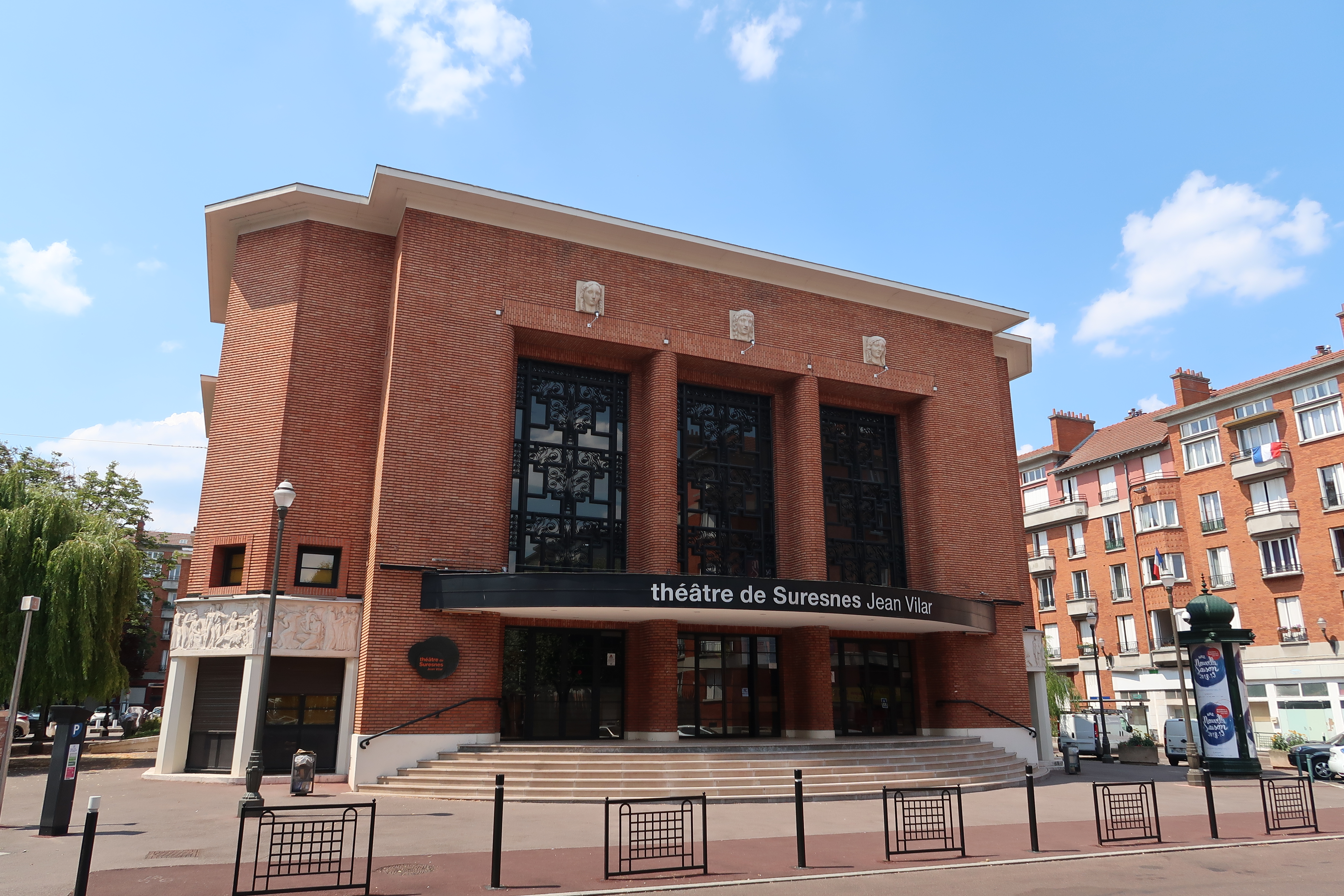
Jean-Vilar Theatre.

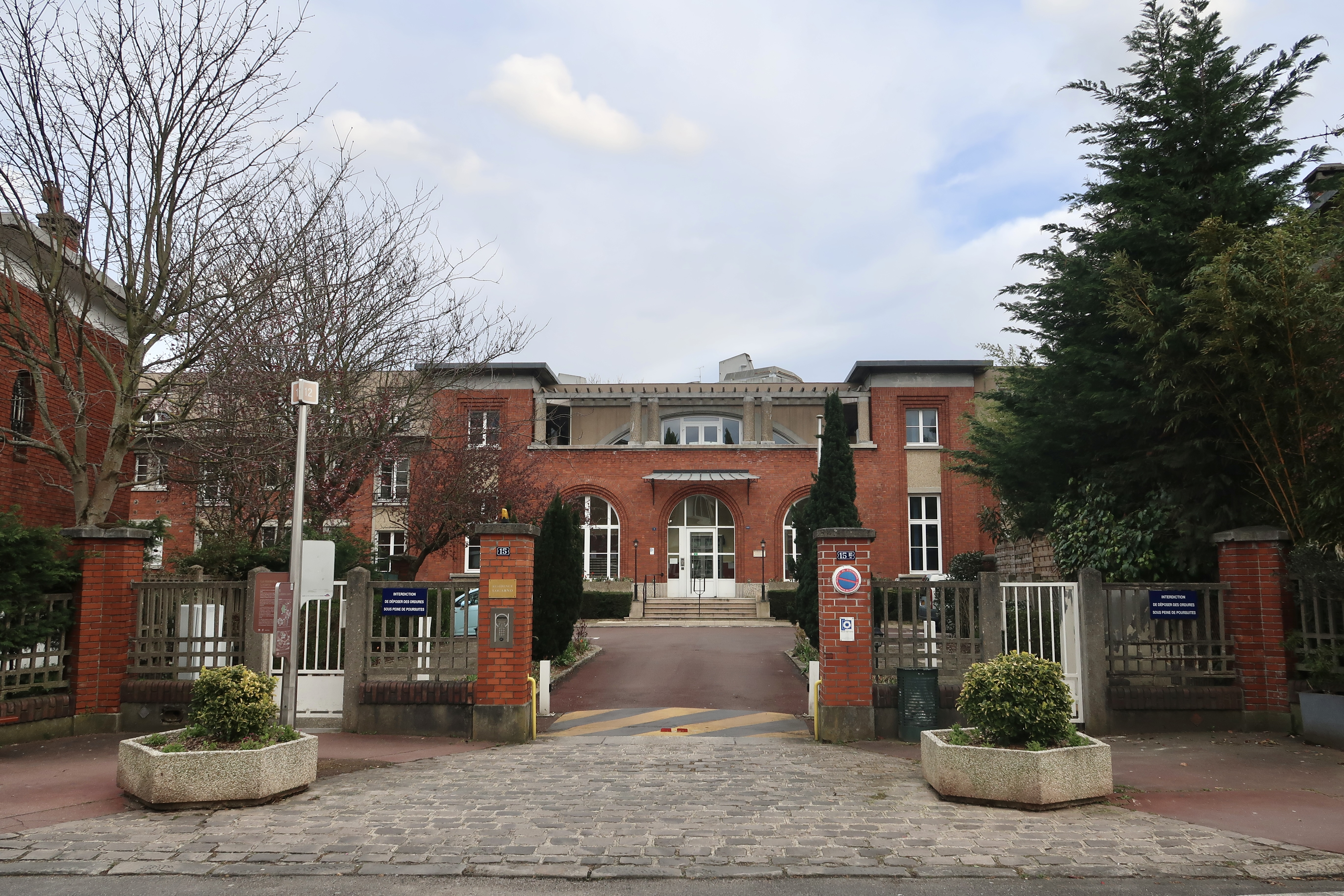
Locarno Residence.

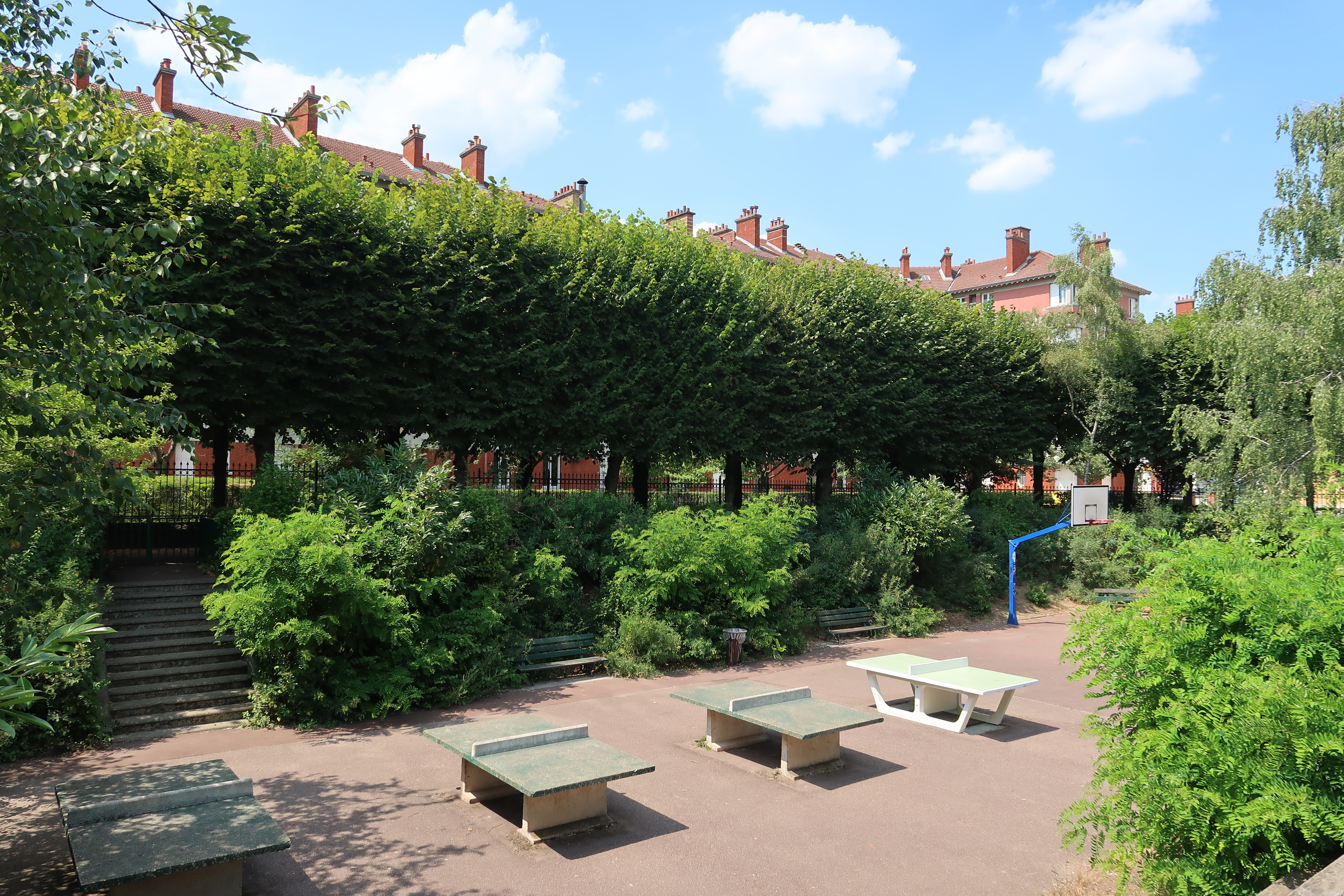
Léon-Bourgeois Square.

=== Education ===
From the first phase of construction between 1922 and 1926, the garden city was equipped with schools: the Vaillant-Jaurès school group, the Aristide Briand school, then the Wilson nursery school. The Groupe Scolaire Vaillant-Jaurès (transl. Vaillant-Jaurès school group) was the first to be built, from 1922, according to the plans of the architect Alexandre Maistrasse. Its yellow brick architecture is embellished with ironwork, ceramics and magnificent mosaics on the facade, including a monumental clock face. It accommodates around 140 nursery school and 460 primary school students in 14 single-sex classes. Numerous games and educational devices accompany schooling: from weaving looms and merry-go-rounds for the little ones to household arts and woodworking and metal workshops to prepare adolescents for jobs. The interior decor created by Géo le Campion illustrates the principles of life (hygiene, sport, education) and decorates the premises with illustrations from Perrault's tales.

The Groupe Scolaire Aristide Briand (transl. Aristide Briand school group) was built between 1930 and 1933, during the third phase of construction of the garden city. It is now known as Collège Henri Sellier. Faced with the exponential increase in the population, this second school was built to accommodate 15 classes of girls and as many boys while allowing them to have drawing rooms, workshops but also a gymnasium and a swimming pool. Today, 500 students still study in these places.

A nursery school with 4 classes was built at the same time a few steps from the Aristide Briand school: l'école maternelle Wilson (transl. Wilson Elementary School). Its equipment for toddlers is remarkable: merry-go-round, slide, rocking horses, pools allow everyone to learn while having fun.

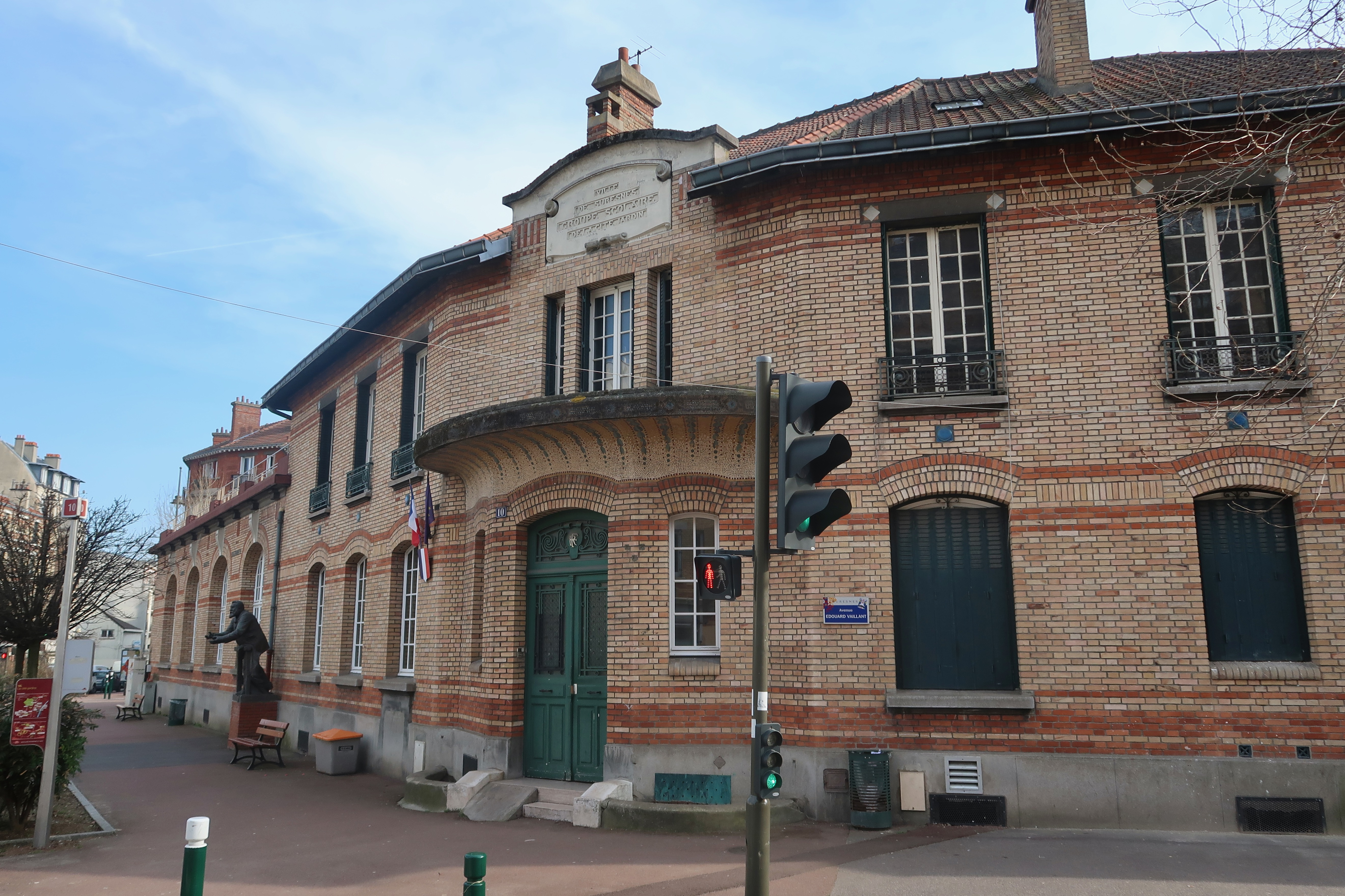
School in avenue Édouard-Vaillant, with a statue of Jean Jaurès (sculptor Paul Ducuing, 1929; it has changed location several times on this square).

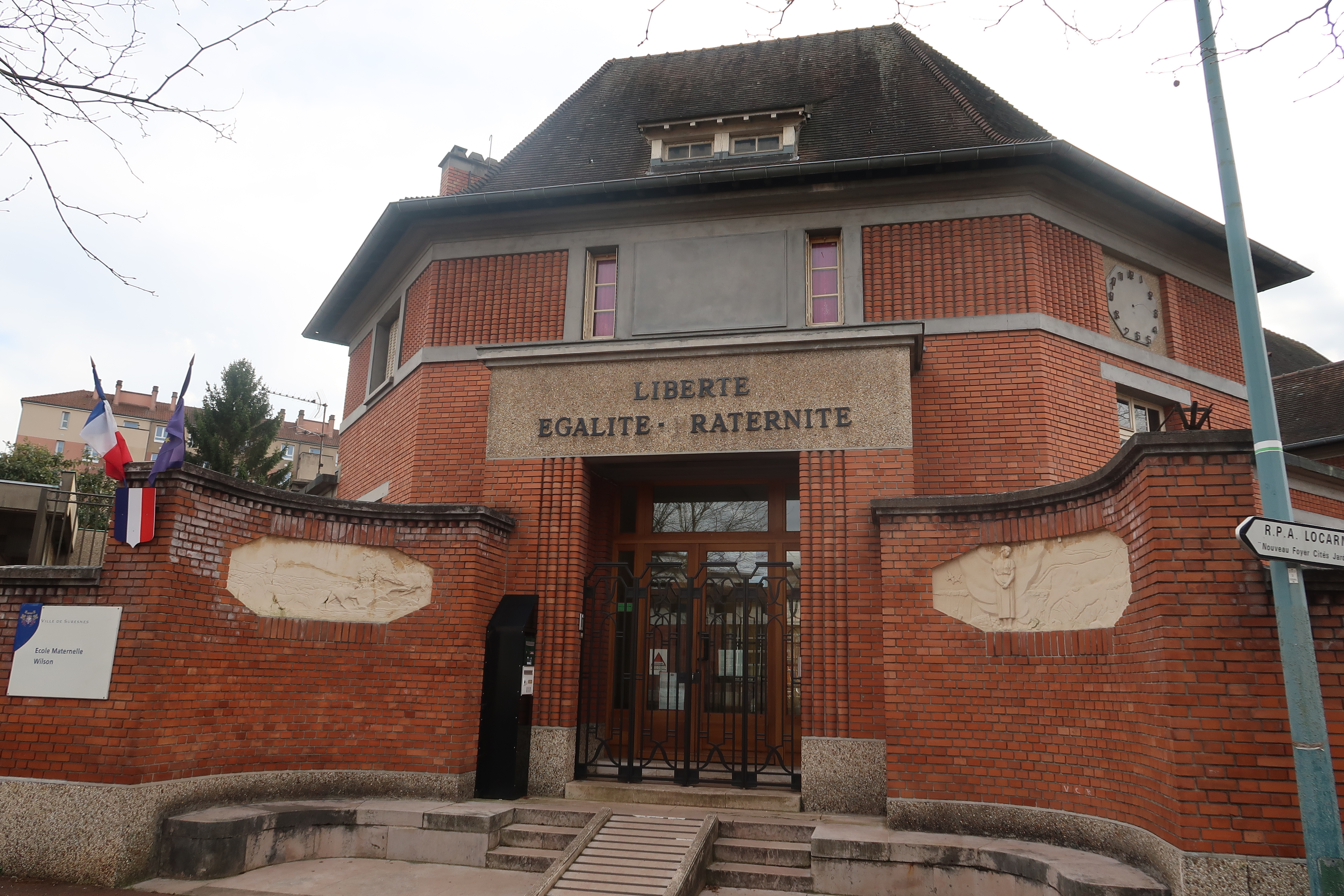
Wilson kindergarten.

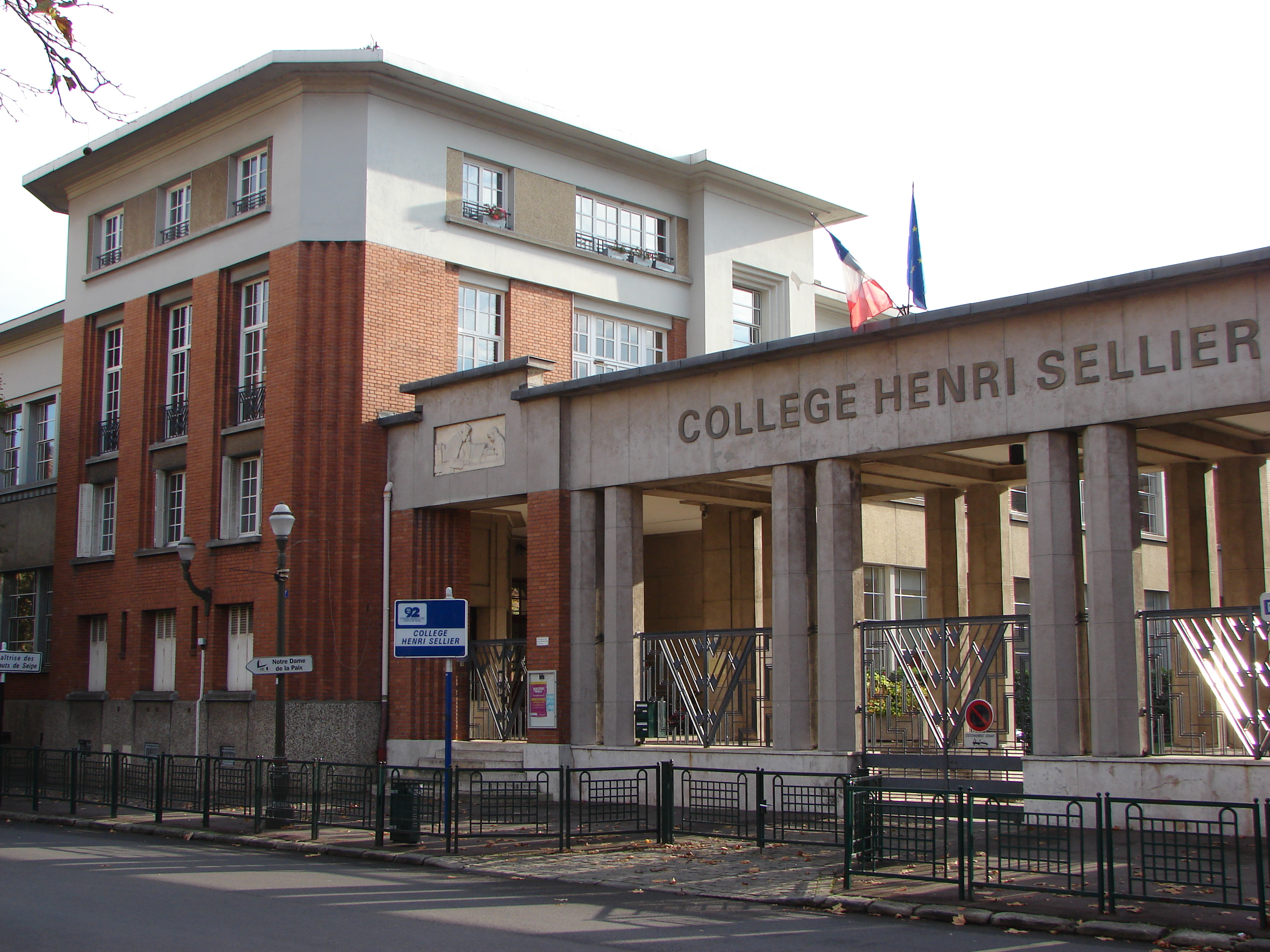
Facade of the Henri-Sellier college.

=== After the war ===
Félix Dumail and Léon Bazin rebuilt housing and enlarged the city after the Second World War. Shower and bath were thus generalized after 1948. The city was definitively completed in 1956, completing the 8th and 9th sections of apartment buildings provided for in the initial project. The garden city then had 3,297 dwellings, including 170 pavilions. Between 1985 and 1996, it was one of the first rehabilitated garden cities.

== Recognitions ==
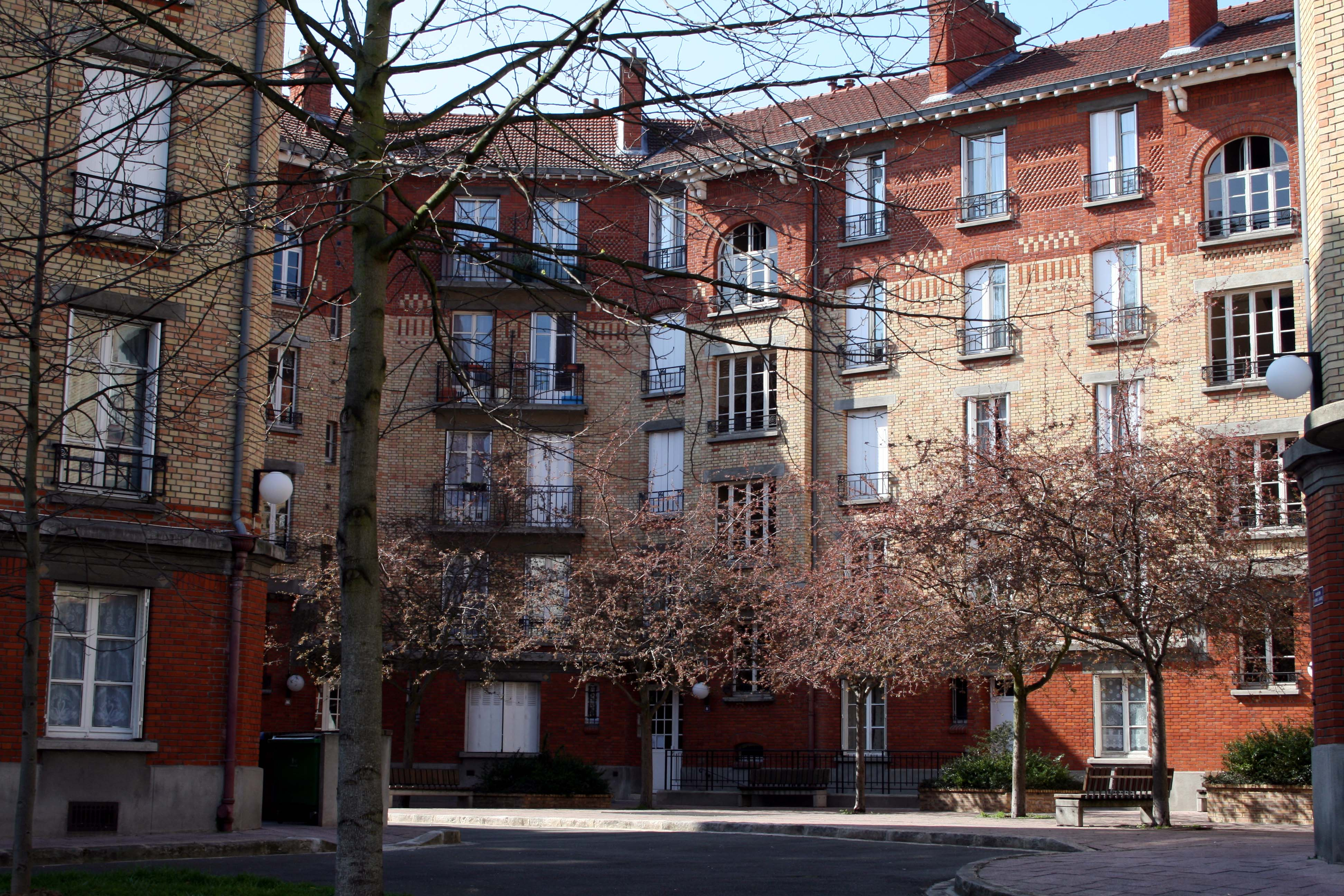
A courtyard of buildings.

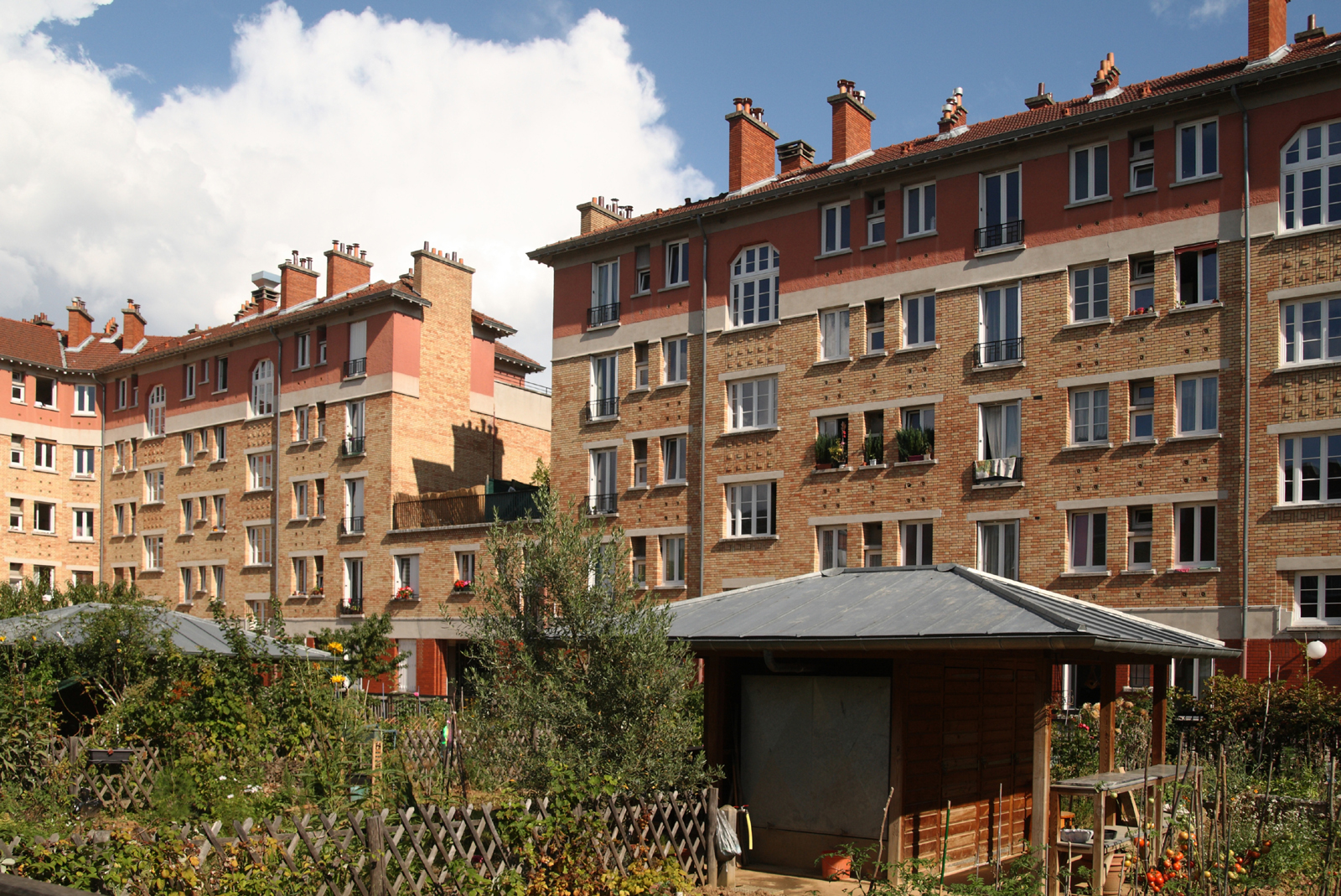
Family gardens in the middle of apartment buildings.

In 1985, the city was included in the inventory of picturesque sites in the Hauts-de-Seine department. Its complete rehabilitation was undertaken from 1986 to 1996. In 1990, the Jean-Vilar theatre was redeveloped.

In 1996, it was protected by a Zone de protection du patrimoine architectural, urbain et paysage (ZPPAUP or transl. Protection zone for architectural, urban and landscape heritage) in 2010, then a heritage site in 2016. In July 2018, the Garden City of Suresnes was labeled 'Heritage of regional interest” by the permanent commission of the Île-de-France regional council.
