= Plainedge, New York =

- Hamlet and census-designated place
- Location in Nassau County and the state of New York

- Location on Long Island Location within the state of New York
- Coordinates: 40°43′23″N 73°28′43″W
- Country: United States
- State: New York
- County: Nassau
- Town: Oyster Bay

Area
  - Total: 1.41 sq mi (3.64 km^{2})
  - Land: 1.41 sq mi (3.64 km^{2})
  - Water: 0 sq mi (0.00 km^{2})
- Elevation: 66 ft (20 m)

Population (2020)
  - Total: 9,517
  - Density: 6,778.7/sq mi (2,617.26/km^{2})
- Time zone: UTC-5 (Eastern (EST))
  - Summer (DST): UTC-4 (EDT)
- ZIP Codes: 11714 (Bethpage); 11735 (Farmingdale); 11783 (Seaford)
- Area codes: 516, 363
- FIPS code: 36-58409
- GNIS feature ID: 0960659

Plainedge (previously known as Turkeyville) is a hamlet and census-designated place (CDP) on the South Shore in the Town of Oyster Bay in Nassau County, on Long Island, in New York, United States. The population was 9,517 at the time of the 2020 census.

== History ==
Plainedge was originally acquired from Marsapeque Indian chiefs Sowwamacus, Wm Choppy, Soureekenny, Wamassum, Sascomoma and Ruampass land as part of the Bethpage Purchase of 1687 by Thomas Powell of the Huntington settlement. At the time, initial purchases from various settlers would occupy the "Plain Edge District" within various districts. The first of note came in 1690, through the efforts of eighteen joint ventures, with the purchase of the "West Neck" that occupied the western arena of Plainedge. In 1694, William Frost purchased all land south of Boundary Avenue, which was gifted to him by Indians Chippie, Maomie and Seruckon. There was still a remainder of land yet to be obtained, however. Through the efforts of Powell, the "Rim of the Woods Purchase" of 1699 acquired the remaining land in the northern section of Plainedge (Boundary Avenue, north to Old Motor Parkway, and Hicksville Road east to Cedar Drive).

The earliest developments of Plainedge past these purchases would manifest through the efforts of landowners and their African slaves. In the late eighteenth century to early nineteenth century, landowners would facilitate and oversee the development of roads, highways, and offices. Meanwhile, in the Township of Oyster Bay, slaves would tend to agriculture, tailoring, and whaling. As for the females, they were the designated homemakers, whose duties pertained to cooking, cleaning, and raising the children. These practices would persist until 1817, when New York legislators enforced the gradual emancipation within the next ten years. By 1823, slavery had fully ceased in Plainedge.

Plainedge would continue to flourish as a hotbed for agriculture. Amidst the Civil War and World War I, residents were relied upon to farm cabbages, cucumbers, and potatoes. Towards the middle of the twentieth century, these industries would slowly cease operations as a blight fell upon the soil, and the State Department of Agriculture placed agricultural restrictions against areas with the presence of Golden Nematodes.

Historian Richard Winsche notes that the "Plain Edge" area was alternatively called "Turkeyville" in the early 1800s, with the area becoming known for its thriving poultry farms; particularly, the inhabitants and their efficiency to raise turkeys. By 1845, with official maps being drafted for school districting, "Turkeyville" fell out of use. The current name, "Plainedge", is of English origin and stems from the geographical description of the Hempstead Plains edge, which stemmed from Massapequa to Westbury.

== Geography ==
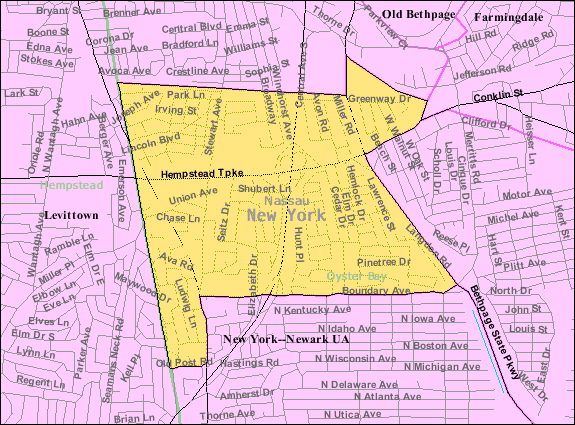
U.S. Census map of Plainedge

According to the United States Census Bureau, the CDP has a total area of 1.4 square miles (3.6 km^{2}), all land.

Plainedge is located approximately 30 miles (50 km) east of Midtown Manhattan and 13 miles (20 km) east of the Queens border. It is bound by Bethpage to the north, Farmingdale and South Farmingdale to the east, North Massapequa to the south, and Levittown to the west.

Because Plainedge is not incorporated as an official town within Nassau County, residents are served by the Bethpage (11714), Massapequa (11758), Seaford (11783), Farmingdale (11735), and Levittown (11756) Post Offices.

== Demographics ==
Historical population
Census	Pop.	Note	%±
1990	8,739		—
2000	9,195		5.2%
2010	8,817		−4.1%
2020	9,517		7.9%
U.S. Decennial Census

=== 2020 census ===
As of the 2020 census, there were 9,517 people, 2,941 housing units, and 2,829 families residing in the CDP, of which contains an average of 3.09 persons each. The population density was 6,778.49/sq mi (2,617.26/km^{2}). The racial makeup was 73.8% White, 71.3% Non-Hispanic White, 0.6% African American, 0.0% Native American, 14.6% Asian, 0.0% Pacific Islander, and 9.8% from two or more races. Hispanic or Latino of any race were 11.7% of the population. 14% were foreign-born citizens.

Within the population, 7.3% were below the age of 5, 21.1% were below the age of 18, and 16.9% were over the age of 65. 51.4% were female.

The median value of owner-occupied housing units was approximately $592,000. The median households income in the CDP was $155,670 and the per capita income was $57,079. About 4.8% of all citizens live below the poverty line.

== Education ==
The hamlet is primarily served by the Plainedge Union Free School District. Since 2011, the superintendent was led for 14 years by Edward A. Salina Jr. who resigned at the start of the 2024-2026 school year coming with criticism of his $907,000 payout of sick time, vacation days, and benefits. This resignation came one year after turmoil involving school immunizations and the purchase of security hardware including classroom surveillance without board approval. The current Superintendent is Dr. Chris Zublionis. The district currently consists of five schools:

- Eastplain Elementary School
- John H. West Memorial Elementary School
- Charles E. Schwarting Elementary School
- Plainedge Middle School
- Plainedge High School

The eastern portions of the hamlet are within the boundaries of the Farmingdale Union Free School District.
