= Massapequa Creek =

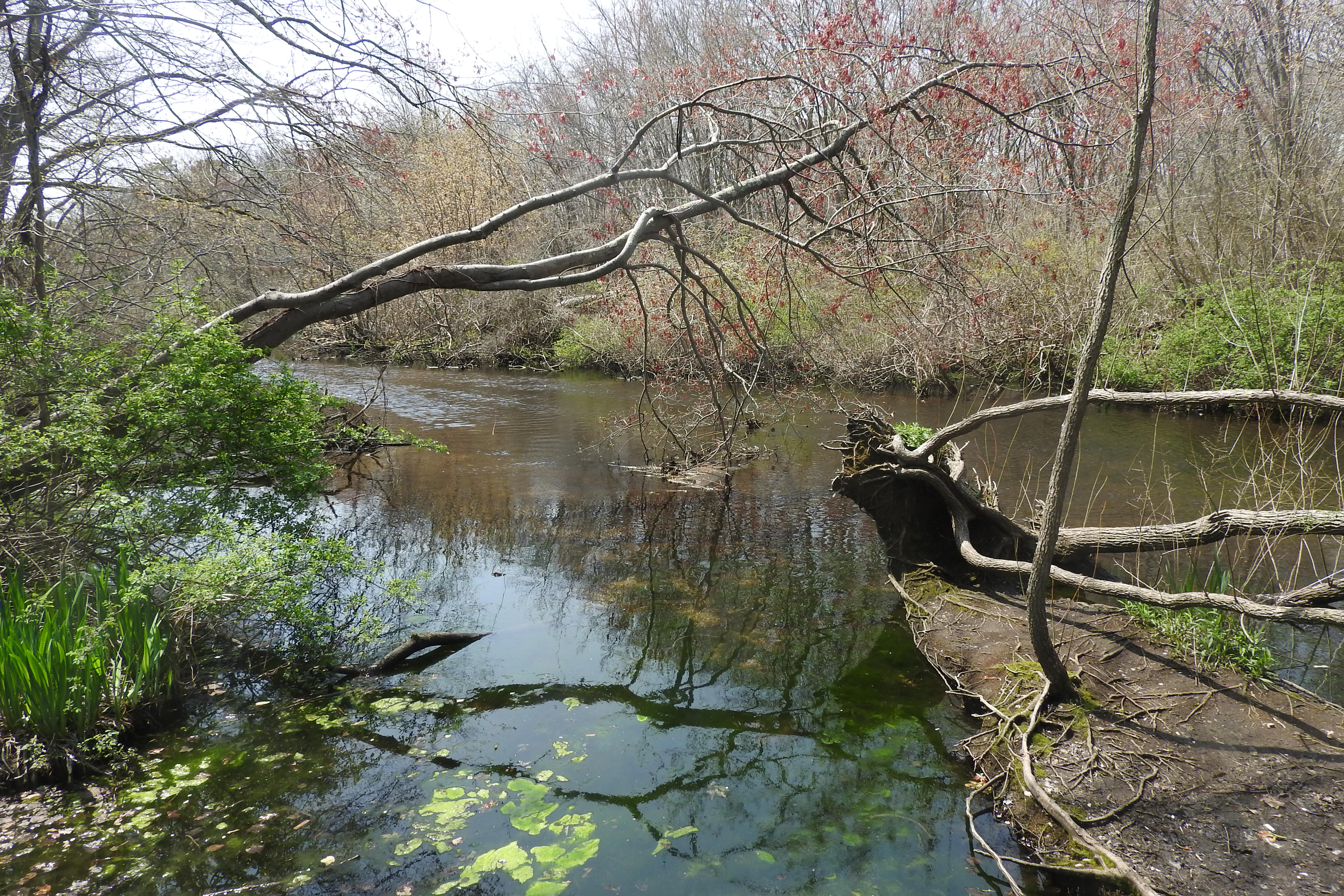
- The creek near the Clark Avenue crossing

Location
- Country: United States
- State: New York
- County: Nassau
- Towns: South Farmingdale, Massapequa Park, Massapequa

Physical characteristics
- Source: Western Tributary
  - location: Bethpage Parkway & Merritts Road, Farmingdale, New York
  - coordinates: 40.716605°N 73.458225°W
- 2nd source: Central Tributary
  - location: Radcliffe Avenue, Farmingdale, New York
  - coordinates: 40.717374°N 73.451952°W
- 3rd source: Eastern Tributary
  - location: Main Street & Junard Drive, Farmingdale, New York
  - coordinates: 40.717213°N 73.436797°W
- Mouth
  - location: Massapequa Cove, Massapequa, New York
  - coordinates: 40.6536111°N 73.4708333°W
- Length: 4.8 mi (7.7 km)
- Basin size: 6.67 mi^{2} (17.3 km^{2})

Massapequa Creek is a 4.8-mile-long (7.7 km) creek that runs through Nassau County, New York, and empties into South Oyster Bay.

== Description ==
Most of the length of the creek exists within the Massapequa Preserve, a 432-acre (175 ha) wooded area that extends from the Southern State Parkway in the north to Merrick Road in the south. The creek's headwaters extend north to Farmingdale, draining an area of 6.67 square miles (17.3 km^{2}).

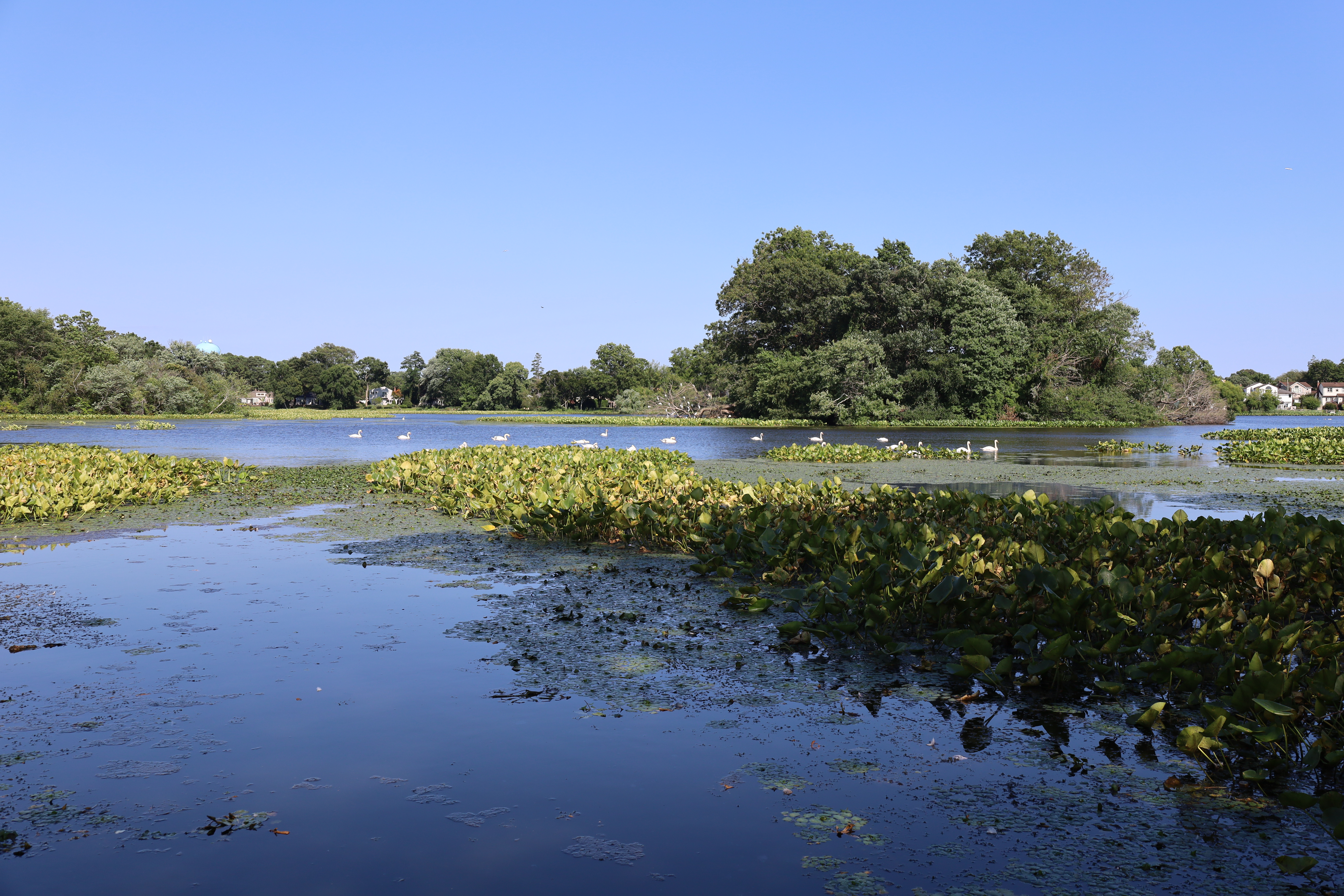
Massapequa Lake in 2021

Like all other rivers on Long Island, Massapequa Creek is fed primarily by groundwater. The creek's three tributaries rise in South Farmingdale, two of which merge in a pond next to Farmingdale High School before crossing under the Southern State Parkway. It continues on the other side of the parkway, joined by the eastern tributary, and crosses Linden Street and into the Massapequa Preserve, passing through three ponds before reaching the Massapequa Reservoir. From there, a spillway takes it under Sunrise Highway into wetland areas, and then into the Massapequa Lake. Two spillways at the south end of the lake pass under Merrick Road into a canal, which leads into Massapequa Cove and South Oyster Bay.

== List of crossings of Massapequa Creek ==
- Southern State Parkway
- Linden Street
- Clark Avenue
- Long Island Rail Road Babylon Branch
- Sunrise Highway
- Merrick Road

== See also ==
- Mill River (Hempstead, New York)
- Motts Creek (Nassau County, New York)
