= Dan Villari =

American football player (born 2002)

No. 83 – Los Angeles Rams
- Position: Tight end
- Roster status: Practice squad

Personal information
- Born: June 29, 2002 (age 24); Massapequa, New York, U.S.
- Listed height: 6 ft 4 in (1.93 m)
- Listed weight: 243 lb (110 kg)

Career information
- High school: Plainedge (North Massapequa, New York)
- College: Michigan (2020–2021); Syracuse (2022–2025)
- NFL draft: 2026: undrafted

Career history
- Los Angeles Rams (2026–present)*
- * Offseason or practice squad member only
- Stats at Pro Football Reference

Daniel Hunter Villari (born June 29, 2002) is an American professional football tight end for the Los Angeles Rams of the National Football League (NFL). He played college football for the Michigan Wolverines and Syracuse Orange and he was signed by the Rams as an undrafted free agent in 2026.

== Early life ==
Villari attended Plainedge High School in North Massapequa, New York. During his senior season, he rushed for 1,522 yards and 23 touchdowns on 121 carries and completed 67 of 113 pass attempts for 1,306 yards and 13 touchdowns. Coming out of high school, Villari was rated as a three-star recruit and the 40th overall quarterback in the class of 2021 by 247Sports, and committed to play college football for the Michigan Wolverines over offers from other schools such as Buffalo, UMass, Fordham, and Albany.

== College career ==
=== Michigan ===
During his two seasons with Michigan in 2020 and 2021, Villari completed just one of his three pass attempts for 26 yards, while also running for 35 yards on nine carries.

=== Syracuse ===
Villari transferred to play for the Syracuse Orange. After transferring, he transitioned to play tight end for the Orange. During the 2022 season, Villari made three starts, recording one catch for 22 yards. In Week 5 of the 2023 season, he totaled two catches for 65 yards and a touchdown against Clemson. In Week 11, Villari ran for 154 yards and a touchdown on 17 carries in a win over Pittsburgh. On the season, he caught 20 passes for 180 yards and three touchdowns, rushed for 326 yards and two touchdowns on 55 carries, and completed 23 of 33 passes for 177 yards and a touchdown. During the 2024 season, Villari hauled in six passes for 57 yards. In Week 1 of the 2025 season, he hauled in four passes for 55 yards against Tennessee. In the regular season finale, Villari rushed for 44 yards and a touchdown on 11 carries in a loss versus Boston College. He finished the 2025 season with 39 catches for 412 yards as well as one rushing touchdown.

=== Statistics ===
Year	Team	Games			Passing								Rushing				Receiving			
Year	Team	GP	GS	Record (Note: Accounts for only GS as a QB. Villari started 12/21/2023 at QB. All other starts were at TE.)	Cmp	Att	Pct	Yds	Y/A	TD	Int	Rtg	Att	Yds	Avg	TD	Rec	Yds	Avg	TD
2020	Michigan	0	0	—	Redshirted (redshirt)															
2021	Michigan	4	0	—	1	3	33.3	26	8.7	0	0	106.1	9	35	3.9	0	0	0	0.0	0
2022	Syracuse	7	3	—	0	0	0.0	0	0.0	0	0	0.0	0	0	0.0	0	1	22	22.0	0
2023	Syracuse	13	10	0–1	22	33	69.7	177	5.4	1	2	112.6	55	326	5.9	2	20	180	9.0	3
2024	Syracuse	12	2	—	0	0	0.0	0	0.0	0	0	0.0	12	29	2.4	1	6	57	9.5	0
2025	Syracuse	12	10	—	0	0	0.0	0	0.0	0	0	0.0	17	55	3.2	1	39	412	10.6	0
Career		48	25	0−1	24	36	66.7	203	5.6	1	2	112.1	93	445	4.8	4	66	671	10.2	3

== Professional career ==
Pre-draft measurables
Height	Weight	Arm length	Hand span	Wingspan	40-yard dash	10-yard split	20-yard split	20-yard shuttle	Three-cone drill
6 ft 3 7/8 in (1.93 m)	243 lb (110 kg)	32 1/4 in (0.82 m)	9 3/4 in (0.25 m)	6 ft 6 1/2 in (1.99 m)	4.81 s	1.66 s	2.75 s	4.31 s	7.04 s
All values from Pro Day

After going unselected in the 2026 NFL Draft, on April 28, 2026 the Los Angeles Rams signed Villari as an undrafted free agent. On August 30, he was waived by the Rams as a part of final roster cuts, but subsequently re-signed to the team's practice squad the following day.
