= High Roller: The Stu Ungar Story =

- Directed by: A. W. Vidmer
- Written by: A. W. Vidmer
- Produced by: F.A. Miller
- Starring: Michael Imperioli; Renee Faia; Michael Nouri; Michael Pasternak; Pat Morita; Vincent Van Patten; Cynthia Brimhall
- Edited by: A. W. Vidmer
- Music by: Jeff Eden Fair; Starr Parodi
- Distributed by: New Line Home Video
- Release date: 2003
- Running time: 110 minutes
- Country: United States
- Language: English

High Roller: The Stu Ungar Story is a 2003 biopic focusing on the life of American professional poker and gin player Stu Ungar. Stuey is the film's alternate title. The film features cameos from several figures from the world of professional sports and poker, including Vince Van Patten, Andy Glazer and Al Bernstein.

== Plot ==
High Roller is told in flashback. Ungar (Michael Imperioli), in a motel room on the last night of his life, relates his personal story to a stranger (Michael Pasternak). He speaks of growing up as the son of a bookie, his career as a tournament gin player, moving into poker, his marriage and the birth of his daughter Stefanie, cocaine abuse, and the breakup of his marriage. The film climaxes with Ungar's third victory at the Main Event of the World Series of Poker a year before his passing. In the final scene, Ungar departs the motel room with the stranger (who apparently represents the Grim Reaper).

== Cast ==
- Michael Imperioli as Stu Ungar
  - Jonathan Press as Young Stu Ungar
- Renee Faia as Angela
- Michael Nouri as Vincent
- Michael Pasternak as The Stranger
- Pat Morita as Mr. Leo
- Vincent Van Patten as Jimmy "Jimmy D"
- Cynthia Brimhall as Sondra
- Al Bernstein as Himself
- Andrew N.S. Glazer as Himself
- Brian Kaplan as John Strzemp
- Evan Broder as Goldstein
- Todd Susman as Max Ungar
- Tommy Cannary as Sol
- Peggy Walton-Walker as Flo Ungar
- A.W. Vidmer as Gin Victim
- Lon Gary as Poker Player
- David Dwyer as Poker Player
- Steve Schirripa as Anthony

== Awards ==
- Nashville Film Festival Audience Choice Award - Best Feature (2003)
- PRISM Awards Commendation (2004)
- San Diego Film Festival Festival Award - Best Director (2003)
