= Vidmer =

Vidmer is a surname. Notable people with the surname include:

- A. W. Vidmer, American film director and screenwriter
- Dick Vidmer (born 1944), American football player
- Tatiana Vidmer (born 1986), Russian basketball player

== See also ==
- Vidmar
