= Plainedge Union Free School District =

School district in the U.S. state of New York

Location
- Plainedge, New York, New York, 11758; United States

District information
- Motto: "Where Everyone Achieves"
- Grades: K–12
- President: Joseph Beyrouty
- Vice-president: Michael Morrisey
- Superintendent: Carol Muscarella
- Deputy superintendent(s): Peter Porrazzo, Lisa DePaola, Joseph Maisano
- Schools: 5
- NCES District ID: 3623190

Students and staff
- Enrollment: 2,880
- Faculty: 235.13
- Colors: Red, white, and black

Other information
- Website: www.plainedgeschools.org

The Plainedge Union Free School District is a school district which serves the hamlets of Plainedge and North Massapequa. It includes Eastplain, John H. West, and Schwarting Elementary Schools; and Plainedge Middle and High Schools.

== Administration ==
The current Superintendent is Dr Christopher Zublionis The school board is currently composed of President Michael Morrisey and Vice President Joseph Garcia; and trustees Joseph Beyrouty, Douglas Pascarella, Ken Auer, Kathleen Versace, and Michael Ponticello.

The principals of the elementary schools are Mark Coccarelli (Eastplain), Sara Azizollahoff (John H. West), and Jennifer Thearle (Schwarting), with Colleen Torres serving as assistant principal at all elementary schools. The principal of the middle school is Anthony DeRiso, the assistant principals are Jennifer Puelo and Vito Mannino, and the dean is Casey Kornahrens. The principal of the high school is Lauren Iocco and the assistant principals are Jennifer Vitale and Kevin Burgoyne.

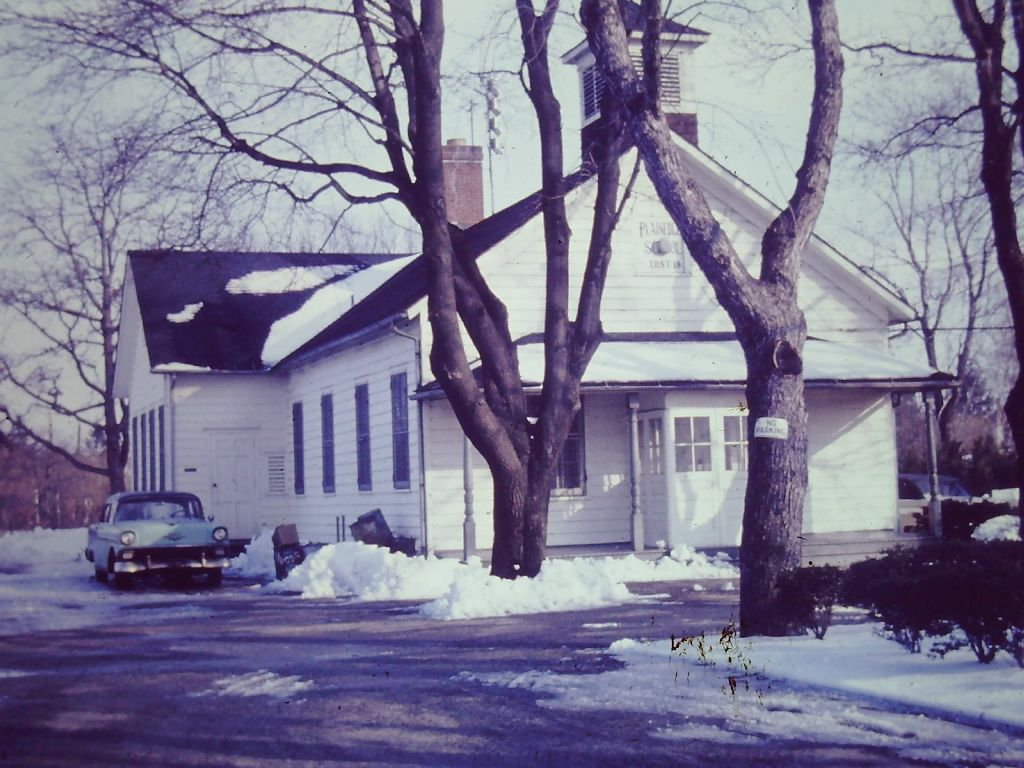
The Plainedge Schoolhouse in the early 1950s

== History ==
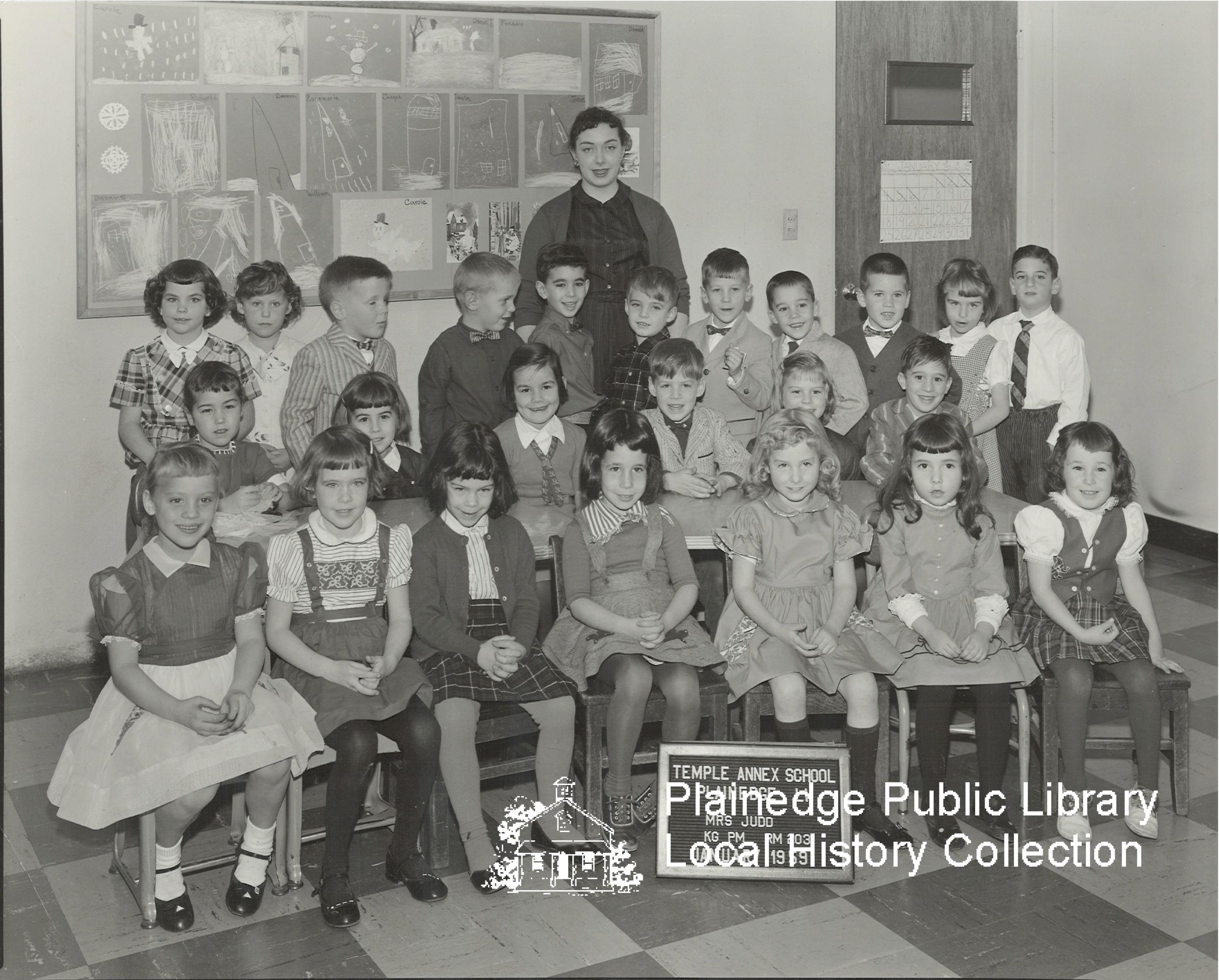
A kindergarten class' picture, taken in 1959 at the Temple Annex School.

The first Plainedge school was housed in a two-room, wood-frame schoolhouse that became known as the "Annex." It served the district until about 1952 when the John H. West elementary school was built. It was then updated and used as the school district's administration office.

On February 19, 1985, the Plainedge School Union's Board of Education was sued by Carl McCall for a refusal to promote her allegedly based on her gender.

As a result of school closures caused by the COVID-19 pandemic, the district arranged a community effort to turn on stadium and porch lights between 8:20 and 8:40PM on May 1, 2020 to honor the graduating senior class.

== Organization ==
The school district is composed of 3 elementary schools, John H. West elementary, Eastplain elementary and Charles E. Schwarting elementary. The middle school is Plainedge Middle School and the high school is Plainedge High School. Former schools include Robert E. Picken elementary, which was sold to the Town of Oyster Bay to serve as a smaller town hall for the southern part of the town; Northedge Elementary (then a kindergarten), which was knocked down to make room for the new middle school; Baldwin Drive Elementary and Southedge Junior High, which were demolished and the land sold for housing; and Sylvia Packard Middle School, which was closed after 40 years.

Since Plainedge is not an official town, its students come from parts of Massapequa, North Massapequa, Bethpage, Seaford and Farmingdale.

== Notable alumni ==
- Manjul Bhargava, mathematician and recipient of the Fields Medal (2014)
- Edward Byrne, New York City Police officer killed on duty in 1988
- Brian Moore, New York City Police officer killed on duty in 2015
- Steve Guttenberg, actor
- Jim Hodder, drummer with Steely Dan
- John Melendez, television writer and radio personality
