= Richard C. Slutzky =

American wrestler

Richard C. Slutzky (born February 17, 1943) is an American wrestler. He is a member of both the Maryland, USA and National Wrestling Halls of Fame. Wrestling for Syracuse University in 1963, he won fourth place in the NCAA Wrestling Tournament. The following year he placed second, losing in the finals against Gordon Hassman

== Early life ==
Slutzky was born in St Louis, Missouri, attended elementary school in California, USA, and secondary school in Plainedge, New York at Plainedge High School. He received his B.S. and M.S. degrees from Syracuse University.

== Career ==
Slutzky served as a Private First Class in the USMCR.

He spent several years teaching and coaching at the university level before beginning his thirty-one year career as a teacher and coach at Aberdeen High School. His contributions to the sport of wrestling resulted in his induction into both the Maryland and National Wrestling Halls of Fame and appointment to the State Board of Directors of the Maryland Chapter of the National Wrestling Hall of Fame.

After deciding not to seek another term, Councilman Slutzky retired from the County Council of Harford County, Maryland after sixteen years service. He represented District E which includes: Aberdeen, Churchville, and Fountain Green. He was first elected in 2002.

As a member of the Harford County Council, Councilman Slutzky served as Liaison to the Board of Education and Chairman of the Adequate Public Facilities Board. His hobbies include athletics, gardening and the study of Native American history and culture.

== Personal life ==
Councilman Slutzky and his wife, Linda, have three sons who reside with their families in Harford County.
