= South Farmingdale, New York =

- Hamlet and census-designated place
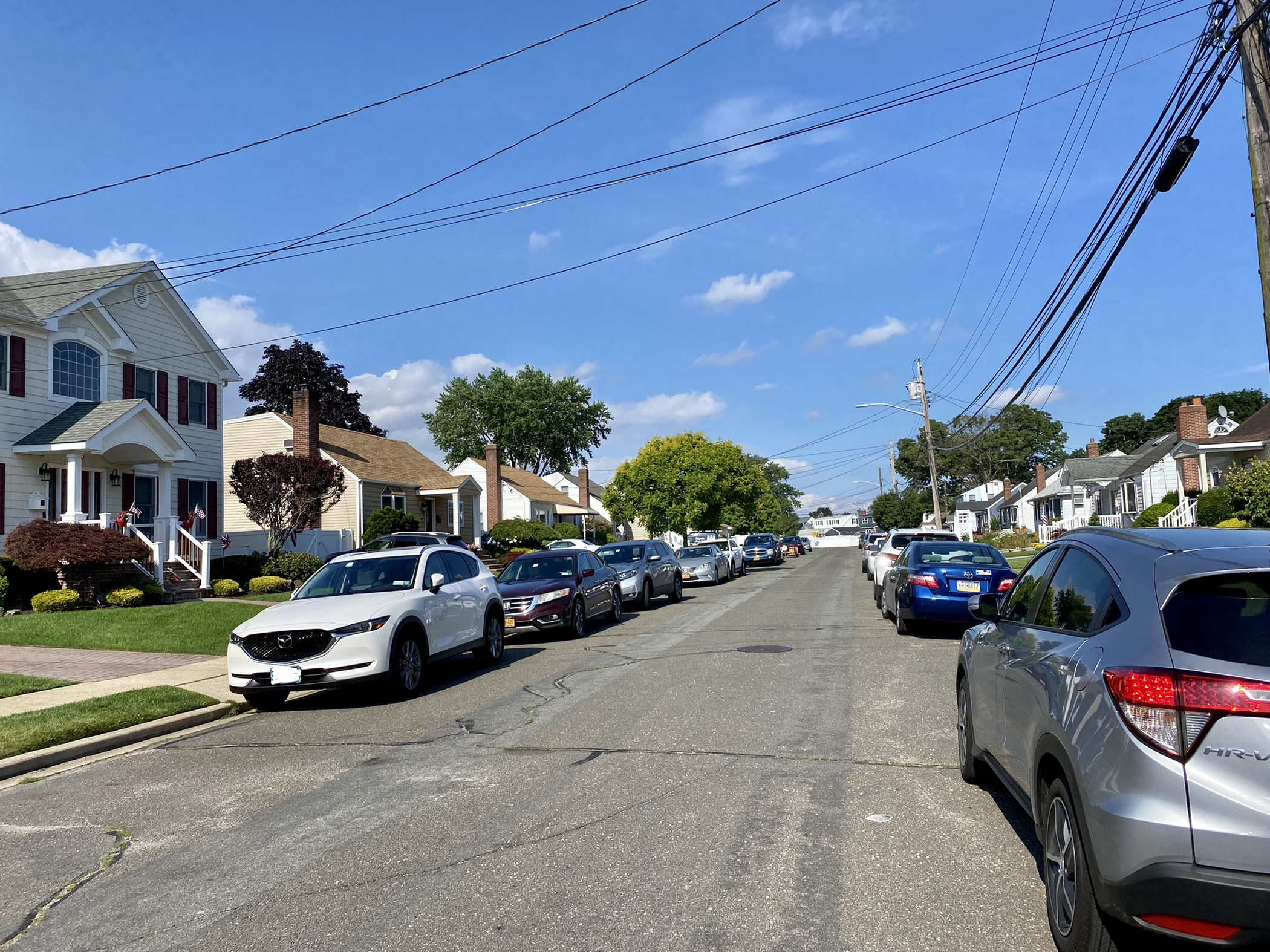
- Willard Avenue in South Farmingdale on July 4, 2021

- Location in Nassau County and the state of New York

- Location on Long Island Location within the state of New York
- Coordinates: 40°43′6″N 73°26′44″W
- Country: United States
- State: New York
- County: Nassau
- Town: Oyster Bay
- Named after: Its location south of Farmingdale

Area
  - Total: 2.20 sq mi (5.69 km^{2})
  - Land: 2.19 sq mi (5.68 km^{2})
  - Water: 0.0039 sq mi (0.01 km^{2})
- Elevation: 59 ft (18 m)

Population (2020)
  - Total: 14,345
  - Density: 6,541.9/sq mi (2,525.83/km^{2})
- Time zone: UTC-5 (Eastern (EST))
  - Summer (DST): UTC-4 (EDT)
- ZIP Codes: 11735 (South Farmingdale); 11758 (Massapequa)
- Area codes: 516, 363
- FIPS code: 36-69001
- GNIS feature ID: 0965744

South Farmingdale is a hamlet and census-designated place (CDP) in the Town of Oyster Bay in Nassau County, on the South Shore of Long Island, in New York, United States. It is considered part of the Greater Farmingdale area, which is anchored by the Incorporated Village of Farmingdale. The population of the CDP was 14,345 at the time of the 2020 census.

== History ==
South Farmingdale's name reflects its geographic location immediately south of and adjacent to the Incorporated Village of Farmingdale.

A railroad station named South Farmingdale previously existed in the hamlet on the Central Branch of the Long Island Rail Road. It had originally opened in 1873 and closed in 1898, and then reopened in 1936 and closed for the final time in 1972.

In September 1961, a wooden figure subsequently identified as the work of the Zulu or another Nguni group of southeastern Africa was discovered buried in a residential backyard. Radiocarbon dating established a date of approximately A.D. 1630, making it one of the oldest surviving African wood carvings known to researchers. The object, known as the Farmingdale Statue, remains in private ownership.

== Geography ==
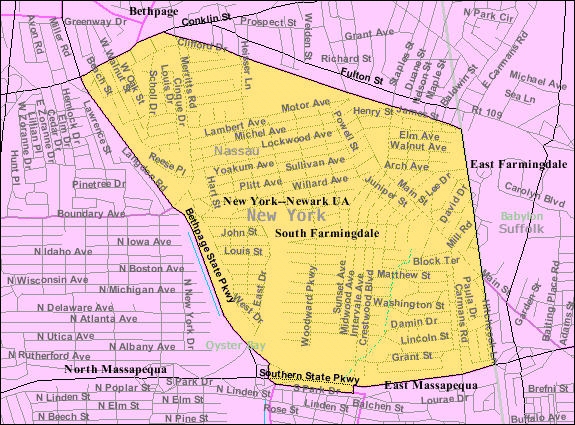
U.S. Census map of South Farmingdale

According to the United States Census Bureau, South Farmingdale has a total area of 2.2 square miles (5.7 km^{2}), all land.

The CDP gained territory between the 1990 census and the 2000 census.

=== Topography and drainage ===
South Farmingdale is located on a flat outwash plain, and as such, the hamlet's topography is largely flat. Additionally, South Farmingdale is split between the Massapequa Creek and Seaford Creek drainage areas, and is located within the larger Long Island Sound/Atlantic Ocean Watershed.

=== Postal services ===
Residents of South Farmingdale have a ZIP code of 11735. They are served by the Farmingdale Post Office, located at 918 Main Street, Farmingdale, NY 11735-5426. While residents can and do typically use Farmingdale as their postal address, the post office also accepts mail that is addressed to South Farmingdale.

== Demographics ==
Historical population
Census	Pop.	Note	%±
2000	15,061		—
2010	14,486		−3.8%
2020	14,345		−1.0%
U.S. Decennial Census

=== 2020 census ===
As of the 2020 census, South Farmingdale had a population of 14,345. The median age was 42.8 years. 19.4% of residents were under the age of 18 and 17.5% of residents were 65 years of age or older. For every 100 females there were 96.3 males, and for every 100 females age 18 and over there were 94.3 males age 18 and over.

100.0% of residents lived in urban areas, while 0.0% lived in rural areas.

There were 4,765 households in South Farmingdale, of which 32.4% had children under the age of 18 living in them. Of all households, 63.6% were married-couple households, 11.3% were households with a male householder and no spouse or partner present, and 20.9% were households with a female householder and no spouse or partner present. About 15.7% of all households were made up of individuals and 9.1% had someone living alone who was 65 years of age or older.

There were 4,902 housing units, of which 2.8% were vacant. The homeowner vacancy rate was 0.7% and the rental vacancy rate was 8.6%.

Racial composition as of the 2020 census
Race	Number	Percent
White	11,366	79.2%
Black or African American	324	2.3%
American Indian and Alaska Native	35	0.2%
Asian	789	5.5%
Native Hawaiian and Other Pacific Islander	0	0.0%
Some other race	786	5.5%
Two or more races	1,045	7.3%
Hispanic or Latino (of any race)	2,078	14.5%

=== 2010 census ===
At the time of the 2010 census, there were 14,486 people residing in the CDP. The racial makeup of the CDP was 90.1% White 83% Non-Hispanic White, 1.4% African American, 0.1% Native American, 4.5% Asian, 0.0% Pacific Islander, 2.2% from other races, and 1.7% from two or more races. Hispanics or Latinos of any race were 10% of the population.

=== 2000 census ===
At the time of the 2000 census, there were 15,061 people 4,899 households, and 4,095 families residing in the CDP. The population density was 6,886.0 inhabitants per square mile (2,658.7/km^{2}). There were 4,950 housing units at an average density of 2,263.2 per square mile (873.8/km^{2}). The racial makeup of the CDP was 93.01% White, 0.79% African American, 0.08% Native American, 3.18% Asian, 0.03% Pacific Islander, 1.85% from other races, and 1.07% from two or more races. Hispanic or Latino of any race were 5.90% of the population.

There were 4,899 households, of which 36.3% had children under the age of 18 living with them, 69.9% were married couples living together, 10.5% had a female householder with no husband present, and 16.4% were non-families. 13.5% of all households were made up of individuals, and 7.2% had someone living alone who was 65 years of age or older. The average household size was 3.07 and the average family size was 3.37.

Age distribution was 25.1% under the age of 18, 6.2% from 18 to 24, 30.8% from 25 to 44, 21.7% from 45 to 64, and 16.2% who were 65 years of age or older. The median age was 38 years. For every 100 females, there were 96.5 males. For every 100 females age 18 and over, there were 91.0 males.

The median household income was $71,168, and the median family income was $76,049. Males had a median income of $52,290 versus $36,475 for females. The per capita income for the CDP was $25,927. About 2.5% of families and 2.8% of the population were below the poverty line, including 4.4% of those under age 18 and 2.9% of those age 65 or over.

== Government ==
As an unincorporated hamlet within the Town of Oyster Bay, South Farmingdale is governed directly by the town's government, which is seated in Oyster Bay.

=== Politics ===
In the 2024 U.S. presidential election, the majority of South Farmingdale voters voted for Donald J. Trump (R).

== Education ==
=== Schools ===
South Farmingdale is served by the Farmingdale Union Free School District.

The district includes Farmingdale High School, Howitt Middle School, Northside Elementary School, Woodward Parkway School, Albany Avenue Elementary School, and Saltzman East Memorial. Furthermore, the Woodward Parkway Elementary School and Farmingdale High School are both located within South Farmingdale.

=== Library district ===
South Farmingdale is located within the boundaries of the Farmingdale Library District, which is served by the Farmingdale Public Library.

Furthermore, the Farmingdale Public Library is located within the hamlet, at 116 Merritts Road.

== Parks and recreation ==
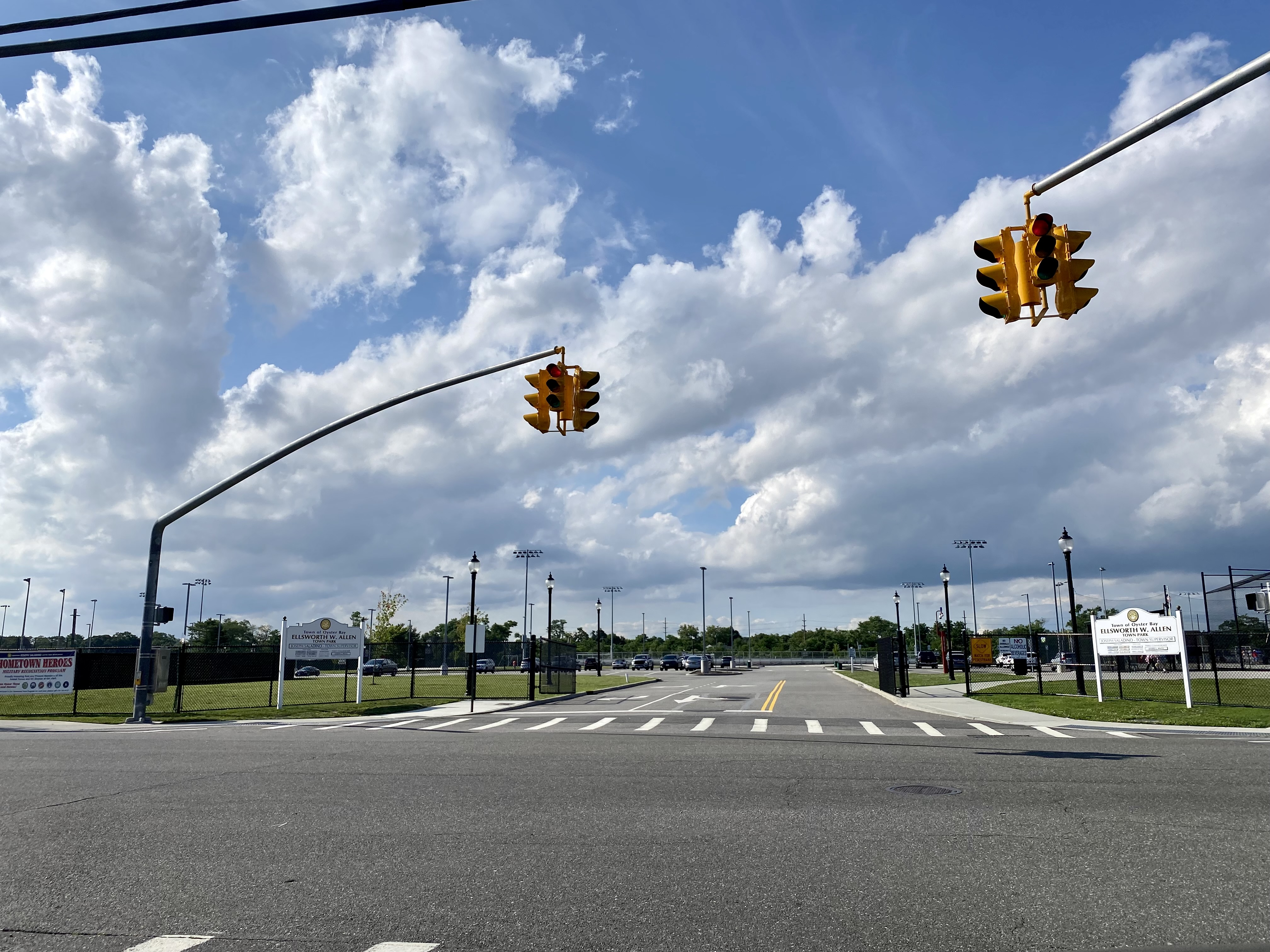
An entrance to Ellsworth W. Allen Town Park in 2021

South Farmingdale is home to Ellsworth W. Allen Town Park, which is owned and operated by the Town of Oyster Bay. The park has an area of approximately 15.8 acres (6.4 ha) and includes a playground, several athletic fields, a spray park, and areas for picnicking.

== Infrastructure ==
=== Transportation ===
==== Road ====
Major roads in South Farmingdale include Merritts Road, Motor Avenue, and the Southern State Parkway.

==== Rail ====
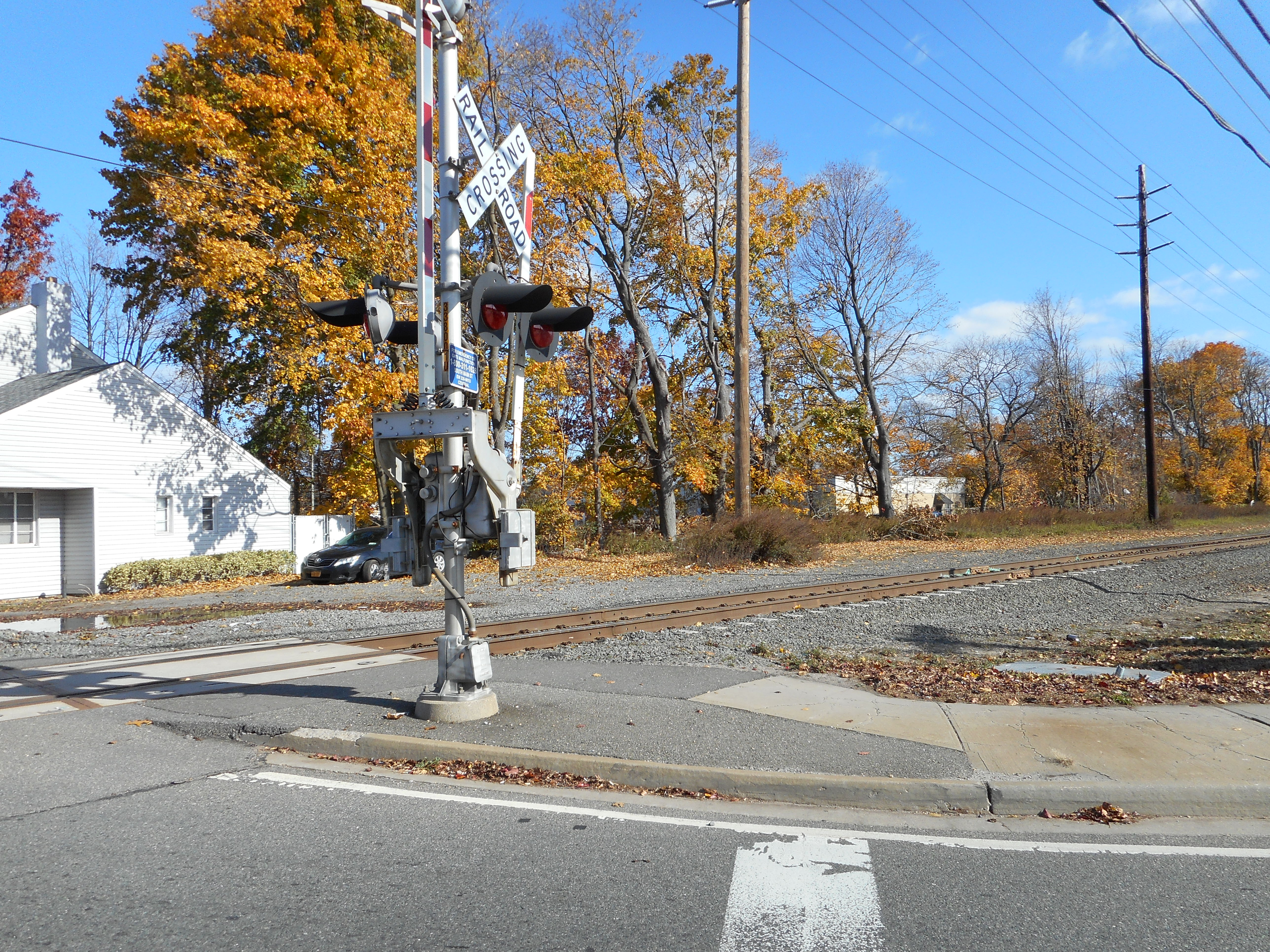
The LIRR's Central Branch within South Farmingdale, at the site of the former, eponymous station in 2014

No Long Island Rail Road stations are located within the hamlet – although the LIRR's Central Branch forms its northern border. The nearest stations to the hamlet are Farmingdale on the Ronkonkoma Branch and Massapequa Park on the Babylon Branch.

Additionally, the now-closed South Farmingdale station was once located on the Central Branch, within the hamlet; it closed in the 1970s. It was along this stretch of the Central Branch that Mile-a-Minute Murphy set a record in 1899, pedaling a bicycle for one mile behind a train in less than one minute.

=== Utilities ===
==== Natural gas ====
National Grid USA provides natural gas to homes and businesses that are hooked up to natural gas lines in South Farmingdale.

==== Power ====
PSEG Long Island provides power to all homes and businesses within South Farmingdale, on behalf of the Long Island Power Authority.

==== Sewage ====
South Farmingdale is located entirely within the Nassau County Sewage District and is connected to its sanitary sewer network.

==== Water ====
South Farmingdale is located with the boundaries of (and is thus served by) the South Farmingdale Water District, which has provided service to the area since 1931.

=== Emergency services ===
==== Fire ====
South Farmingdale is primarily within the boundaries of (and is thus served by) the South Farmingdale Fire District. The district's main firehouse is located at 819 Main Street, while a second station is at the corner of Merrits Rd and Beverly Road. A small portion of the hamlet, meanwhile, is located within the boundaries of (and is thus served by) the North Massapequa Fire District.

==== Police ====
South Farmingdale is served by the Nassau County Police Department's 8th Precinct, with RMPs 816 and 817 assigned as the patrol cars for the hamlet.

== See also ==
- Farmingdale, New York
- East Farmingdale, New York
