= Joe Pantorno =

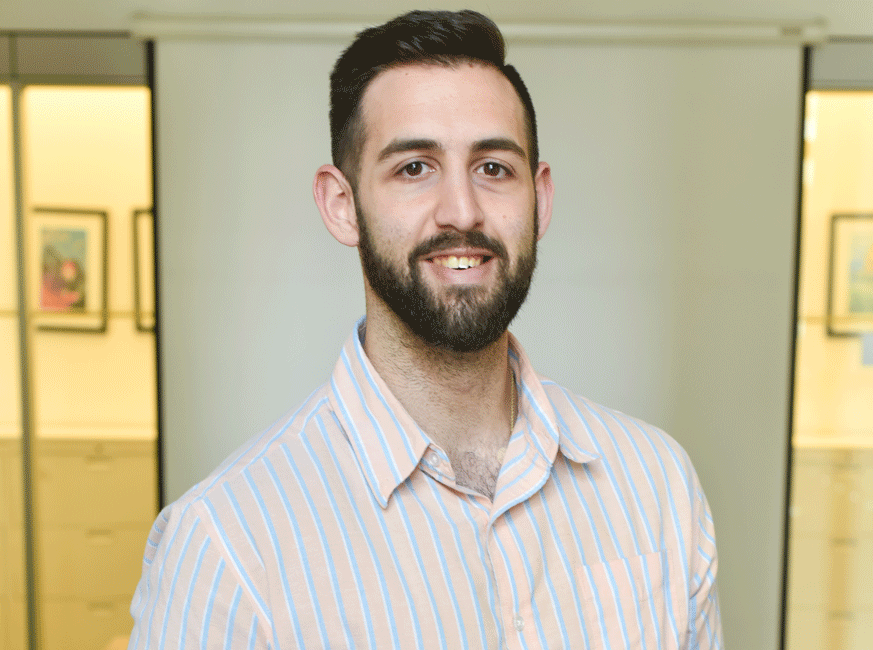
- Born: December 10, 1991 (age 34); Bethpage, NY
- Education: Farmingdale High School ('09) Hofstra University, B.A. Journalism ('13)
- Occupations: Sportswriter, Editor, Analyst
- Employer: amNewYork

Joe Pantorno (born 10 December 1991) is an American sportswriter, journalist, editor, and analyst. He serves as the sports editor for amNewYork newspaper in Brooklyn, New York.

Pantorno formerly held positions with Newsday, the New York Post, and Bleacher Report.

== Education ==
Growing up in North Massapequa, New York, Pantorno attended Farmingdale High School before completing his Bachelor of Arts (BA) in Journalism from Hofstra University. He was elected editor-in-chief of the school's student-run, independent newspaper, The Hofstra Chronicle.

== Career ==
Before graduating from Hofstra University, Pantorno interned in the sports departments at the New York Post and Newsday. Upon his departure from the school, he joined the Sports Xchange as a beat reporter for the Brooklyn Nets during the 2013-14 season where his work was featured on Yahoo! Sports. During his tenure with TSX, Pantorno also worked in covering the New York Knicks, New York Mets, New York Yankees, and New York Islanders.

In 2015, Pantorno was hired as a Breaking News Reporter at Bleacher Report.

In March 2017, Pantorno joined Metro New York as their sports editor.

He transferred to amNewYork after Metro was acquired by Schneps Media in January 2020 and merged with amNewYork.
