= Farmingdale High School =

Public high school in Farmingdale, New York, United States

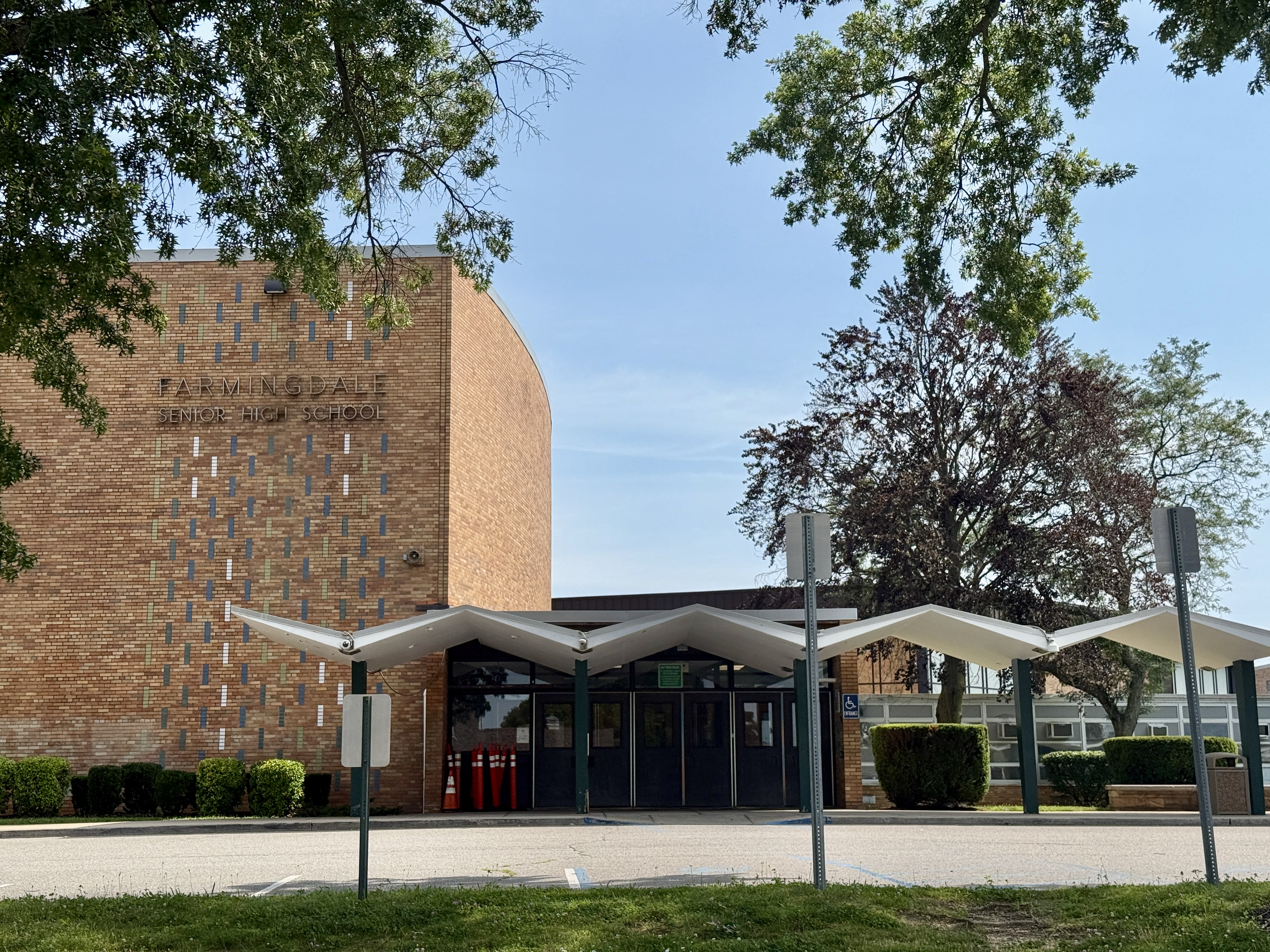
- Farmingdale High School in 2025

Location
- 150 Lincoln Street; South Farmingdale, New York 11735; United States; 40.7076°N 73.4441°W

Information
- School type: Public, high school
- Opened: 1962
- School district: Farmingdale Union Free School District
- Superintendent: Paul Defendini
- CEEB code: 331880
- NCES School ID: 3610980
- Principal: Jed Herman
- Teaching staff: 161.02 FTEs
- Grades: 9–12
- Gender: Coeducational
- Enrollment: 1,690 (as of 2023-2024)
- Student to teacher ratio: 10.50
- Campus: Suburb: Large
- Colors: Green and White
- Nickname: Dalers
- Website: FHS Website

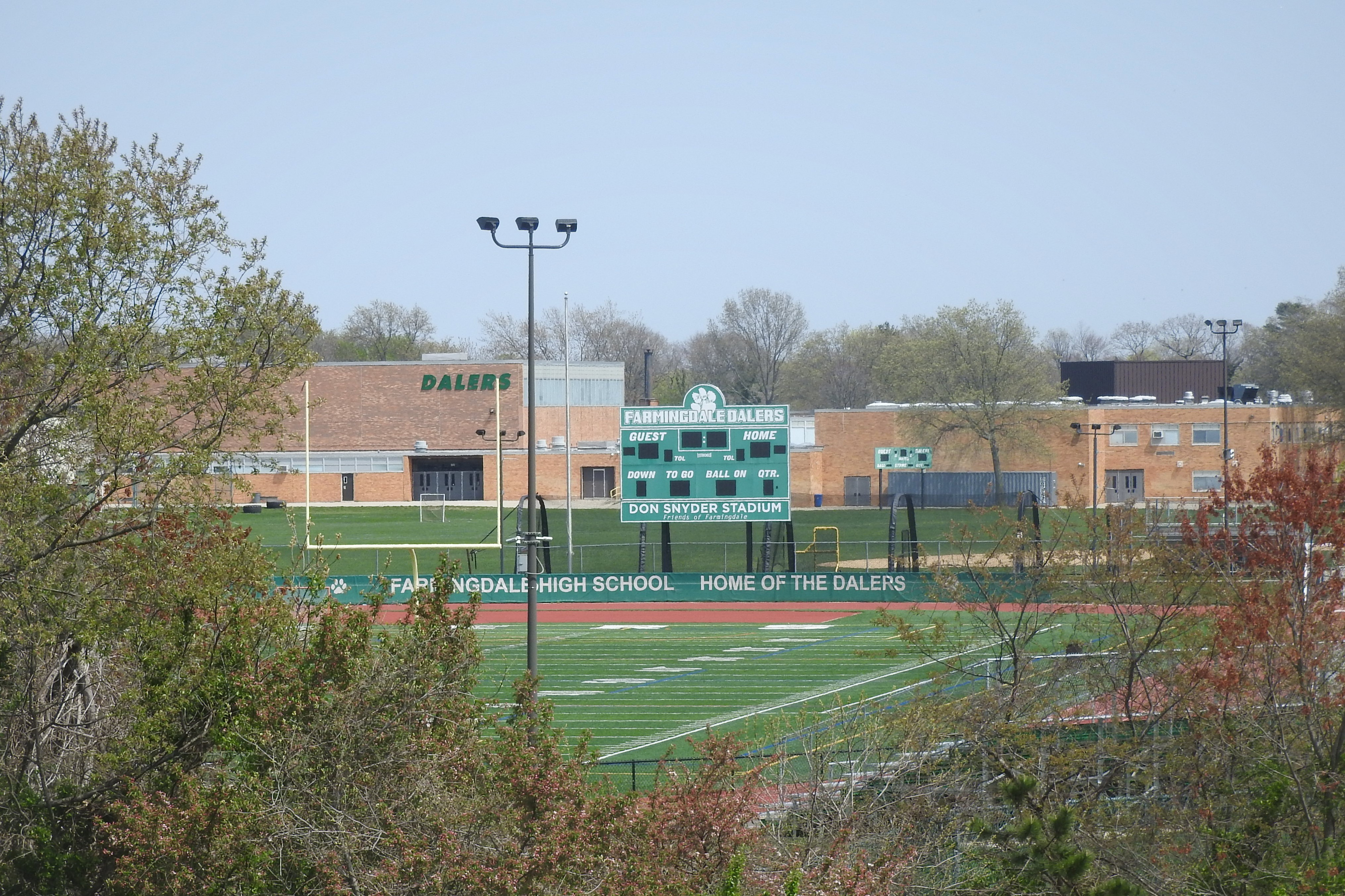
Farmingdale High School's track and field in 2021

Farmingdale High School (also known as Farmingdale Senior High School) is a public high school located in South Farmingdale, on Long Island, in New York, United States.

As the only high school operated by the Farmingdale Union Free School District, the school also serves the Village of Farmingdale and the hamlet of East Farmingdale – in addition to portions of North Amityville, Massapequa Park, and North Massapequa.

== History ==
The school building opened in 1962, as student enrollment within the Farmingdale Union Free School District grew and a new high school facility was needed. Soon after opening, the 79-room school underwent an expansion, through which an additional 49 classrooms were added.

=== Bus crash ===
On September 21, 2023, a coach bus containing forty marching band students and four adults crashed in Wawayanda, New York on its way to a band camp in Greeley, Pennsylvania, killing the band director and a retired teacher. The bus involved had four random roadside inspections since 2021, passing each time.

== Student demographics ==
As of the 2022–21 school year, the school had an enrollment of 1,703 students and 164.93 classroom teachers on an FTE basis for a student–teacher ratio of 10.3. There were 339 students (18.1% of enrollment) eligible for free lunch and 42 (2.2% of students) eligible for reduced-cost lunch.

== Notable alumni ==
- Rob Bartlett (born 1957, class of 1975, actor, writer, and comedian, worked for 31 years on the Imus in the Morning Program, starred in 5 Broadway Shows, had recurring roles on Law & Order SVU, Ugly Betty, The Good Wife, and Elementary, and was one of the original hosts of WWF Monday Night Raw.
- Mark Mathew Braunstein (born 1951, class of 1969), author of Radical Vegetarianism and other books and nonfiction articles.
- Matt Danowski (born 1985, class of 2003), professional lacrosse player with the Chesapeake Bayhawks of Major League Lacrosse.
- Stu Feiner (born 1961, class of 1979), sports handicapper and media personality
- William Gaddis (1922–1998, class of 1941), author of The Recognitions and other works of postmodern fiction.
- Ron Heller, (born 1962) American football player and later coach.
- George Hincape (born 1973 class of 1991), former American road bicycle racer
- Tom Kennedy (born 1995, class of 2013), current NFL player for the Detroit Lions.
- Klayton (born 1969), musician
- Tim Kubart (born 1984, class of 2002), co-host of the Sunny Side Up on Sprout and 2016 Grammy Award Winner for Best Children's Album.
- Jack Lamabe (1936–2007, class of 1954), former Major League Baseball pitcher.
- Joe Pantorno (born 1991, class of 2009), sports editor for amNewYork newspaper.
- SallyAnn Salsano (born 1974, class of 1992), creator of Jersey Shore and owner of 495 Productions.
- Al Weis (born 1938, class of 1955), former Major League Baseball player
- Terry Sweeney (born 1950, class of 1969) Saturday Night Live writer & cast member, actor and writer.
