= Murder of Edward Byrne =

1988 murder of an American police officer

Edward Byrne
- Born: February 21, 1966; New York City, U.S.
- Died: February 26, 1988 (aged 22); New York City, U.S.
- Police career
- Department: New York City Police Department (NYPD)
- Service years: 1986–1988
- Rank: 1986 – Commissioned as a police officer
- Badge no.: 14072

Edward Byrne (February 21, 1966 – February 26, 1988) was a police officer in the New York City Police Department who became well known in the United States after he was murdered in the line of duty.

Byrne's father had also been an NYPD officer. Byrne had joined the NYPD on July 15, 1986, and was stationed in the 103rd Precinct in Jamaica, Queens. Prior to joining the NYPD, Byrne was in the New York City Transit Police.

== Murder ==
Around 3:30 a.m. on February 26, 1988, Byrne was sitting in his marked patrol car on 107th Ave. and Inwood St. in the South Jamaica section of Queens in New York City. He was assigned to keep an eye on the house of a local Guyanese immigrant named Arjune, (Note: Arjune goes by this single name.) who had repeatedly called the police to report illegal activities on his street. The house had been previously firebombed on two occasions and the owner repeatedly threatened. Despite the recent violence and an ongoing crime wave overtaking South Queens, Byrne was assigned to the post alone.

As Byrne sat in his car, another driver pulled up beside him. Two men exited, and one of them knocked on the passenger side window of Byrne's cruiser while a second man crept up on the driver's side and shot Byrne in the head five times with a .38 caliber pistol. Two other men acted as lookouts. Byrne later died at the hospital. He had just turned 22.

The murder prompted national outrage. President Ronald Reagan personally called the Byrne family to offer condolences. Then-Vice President George H. W. Bush carried Byrne's badge with him during his 1988 presidential campaign.

The four killers were identified as Philip Copeland, Todd Scott, Scott Cobb, and David McClary. All four were apprehended within a week of the murder and were eventually convicted. Copeland, Scott, and Cobb were convicted after a trial of murder in the second degree and criminal possession of a weapon in the second degree. McClary was convicted later as the shooter in a separate trial of murder in the second degree and criminal possession of a weapon in the second degree. All four were sentenced to 25 years to life by Queens Supreme Court Justice Thomas A. Demakos, who had presided over the trials. Cobb, in a videotaped confession that was played at trial, provided graphic details of the killing, told how the participants had bragged of it afterward in the aftermath, and indicated that the killing had been ordered from jail by the drug dealer Howard "Pappy" Mason, the leader of their gang. Mason was sentenced to life in prison in 1994 for drug racketeering and for ordering Byrne's murder.

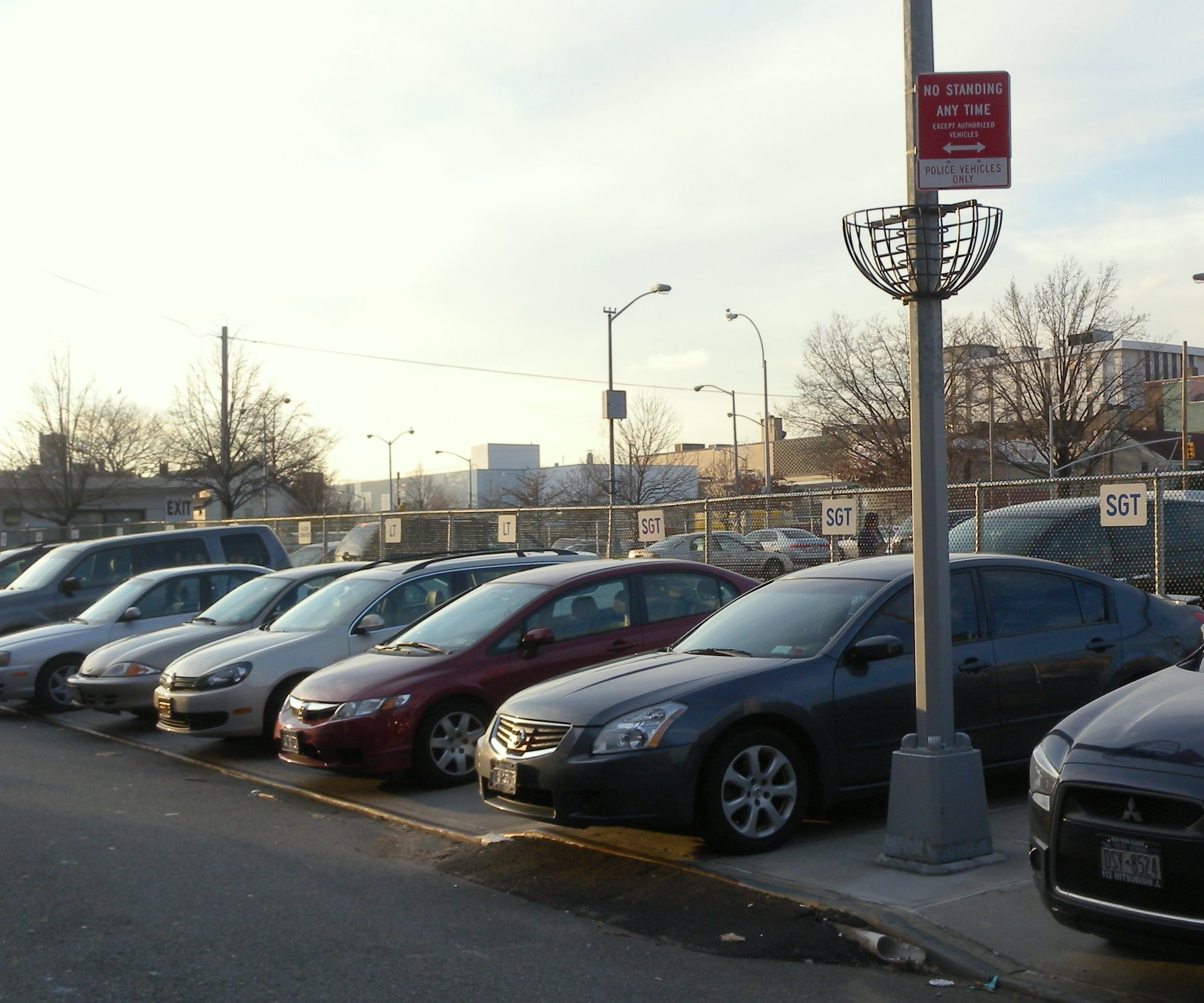
Cars parked on the sidewalk on 91st Ave. outside the 103rd Precinct in 2011

== Legacy ==
After the killing of Byrne, a number of public institutions renamed locations or established programs in his name. On August 3, 1995, a lot in South Ozone Park in Queens was developed into a park and dedicated as Police Officer Edward Byrne Park. That same year, 91st Avenue in Jamaica, Queens was renamed P.O. Edward R. Byrne Avenue. Byrne worked at the 103rd Precinct located on 91st Avenue. The Police Athletic League of New York City renamed its Queens Center the Edward R. Byrne Institute and fills it year-round with educational and recreational programs.

Junior High School 101 in the Bronx was renamed in his honor. On April 20, 2004, the baseball field at his alma mater, Plainedge High School in North Massapequa, New York, was named in his honor.

The United States Department of Justice established the Edward Byrne Memorial Justice Assistance Grant Program, which directs funding to local law enforcement agencies with the primary aim to enhance officer safety via equipment, technology, and training.
