= Andy Glazer =

American poker player, writer, and lawyer (1955–2004)

- Born: Andrew Norman Glazer; December 28, 1955; Amityville, New York, United States
- Died: July 4, 2004 (aged 48); Los Angeles, California, United States
- Education: University of Michigan
- Occupations: Poker tournament reporter, writer, lawyer
- Writing career
- Pen name: The Poker Pundit

Andrew Norman "The Poker Pundit" Glazer (December 28, 1955 – July 4, 2004) was an American poker player, writer, and lawyer who was born in Amityville, New York. He is best known for having been one of poker's most prolific tournament reporters.

== Early life ==
Andy Glazer grew up in Massapequa, New York. He graduated from Plainedge High School in 1973, and went on to attend the University of Michigan. His interest in sportswriting manifested itself early. At high school Glazer was the sports editor of the school newspaper; in college, he served as the Managing Sports Editor for the University of Michigan school newspaper, Michigan Daily, and as a sports commentator for the school radio station. After graduating from the University of Michigan in 1977, he was accepted at the Emory University School of Law. There he served as the editor in chief of the school newspaper until his graduation in 1980.

Glazer practiced law for only two years. He reportedly gave up law after representing a drug dealer whom he knew to be guilty. He won the case by enforcing his client's constitutional right to a speedy trial; the district attorney was not prepared, and the case was dismissed. The case left Glazer feeling guilty and led to his retirement.

== Poker ==
Glazer had often earned extra money during his education by taking trips to Las Vegas or Atlantic City to play blackjack and poker. After his aborted law career, he resumed this habit while he tried establishing himself as a writer. He soon found himself achieving greater success in poker than in writing. Glazer later met Phil Hellmuth at a spiritual place in Northern California called Esalen and they became close friends. His relationship with Hellmuth led to Glazer becoming the tournament reporter for the World Series of Poker. His tournament reports were widely liked for their regard to detail and emotion.

Glazer went on to become a columnist for Card Player Magazine and the Detroit Free Press. He also wrote the books Casino Gambling the Smart Way: How to Have More Fun and Win More Money and Complete Idiot's Guide to Poker (The Complete Idiot's Guide). He helped Hellmuth write Play Poker like the Pros and was mentioned several times in Positively Fifth Street. Right before his death he started writing for finaltablepoker.com.

Though better known in the poker community for his writing; Glazer did achieve some success playing in poker tournaments. In 2002, Glazer finished 22nd in the World Poker Open Championship. In 2003, he finished sixth in the World Poker Tour (WPT) Invitational. In 2004, he won two preliminary tournaments at the Crown Australian Poker Championship. By the time of his death from complications from a blood clot, Andy Glazer's total live tournament winnings exceeded $75,000.
