= Storm Field =

American television meteorologist

- Born: Elliott David Field; November 25, 1948 (age 77)
- Children: 2
- Father: Frank Field

Elliott David "Storm" Field (born November 25, 1948) is an American retired television meteorologist, most noted for his time in the New York media market. He followed his father, longtime New York weatherman Frank Field, into the business.

== Early life ==
Field was given the nickname "Storm" by his parents as a baby, as a result of being very active while still in his mother's womb (which led a doctor to refer to him as a "stormy child"), as well as being born on a stormy night on Thanksgiving Day.

== Career ==
=== WABC-TV ===
Storm Field's first foray into weather-casting came as part of WABC-TV's Eyewitness News program. Hired by the station in March 1976, he first appeared on television when covering Hurricane Belle, followed by working when Tex Antoine was ill. Field did the weekend weather broadcasts as well as the 11:00 PM weather broadcast on weekdays.

Field became the permanent forecaster on November 29, 1976, as a replacement for the suspended Antoine, who had been dismissed after an inappropriate comment concerning a rape story five days earlier. Field's primary responsibilities were the 6:00 PM and 11:00 PM newscasts, with other forecasters (such as Ira Joe Fisher and Sam Champion) appearing on the 5:00 PM newscast. In 1978 Storm Field joined the morning team with Jimmy Fink and Shelli Sonstein at New York radio station WPLJ.

In addition to his weather duties, in 1981 Field became the anchor of the recently launched 5:00 PM Eyewitness News broadcast, working alongside Tracy Egan and Kaity Tong. He would do so until 1983, when Tom Snyder took over the newscast, and subbed off and on until 1984. He left WABC in 1991 and was replaced by Sam Champion.

=== WCBS-TV ===
After taking time off, on August 24, 1992, Field joined his father at WCBS-TV, marking the first time the two had worked together. In anticipation of his debut, WCBS shot a series of commercials with Storm and Frank Field that used puns for both meteorologists' names. The younger Field remained with WCBS until 1997, succeeding Irv "Mr. G" Gikofsky as the station's chief meteorologist and then moving to WCBS' morning newscast toward the end of his time there.

=== WWOR-TV ===
Field's third and last weather position brought him to WWOR-TV in 1997, where he reported on the station's 10 PM newscast and served as WWOR's chief meteorologist. During his tenure he got a second chance to work with his father, as Dr. Frank Field was hired by WWOR as a weekend weathercaster in the early 2000s before retiring.

Field was let go by WWOR in 2007 after ten years due to cutbacks at both WWOR and its sister station, WNYW, and was replaced by former WCBS weather personality Audrey Puente. He retired shortly thereafter.

== Personal life ==
Field has two daughters and lives in Westchester County, New York.
