= Frank Field (meteorologist) =

American television personality and meteorologist (1923–2023)

- Born: Franklyn Feld; March 30, 1923; Queens, New York, U.S.
- Died: July 1, 2023 (aged 100); Florida, U.S.
- Occupations: Television personality, meteorologist
- Years active: 1958–2007
- Spouse: Joan Kaplan (c. 1948–2023; her death)
- Family: 3, including Storm Field

Frank Field (né Franklyn Feld; March 30, 1923 – July 1, 2023) was an American television meteorologist in New York City for five decades, reporting on the weather and science and health topics. He was instrumental in publicizing the Heimlich Maneuver. Field carried the Seal of Approval of the American Meteorological Society.

Field was a resident of Montclair, New Jersey, before retiring to Boca Raton, Florida.

== Biography ==
Field was born Franklyn Feld on March 30, 1923, in Queens, New York, of Ashkenazi Jewish heritage. His parents immigrated to America in 1909 and his last name was later Americanized to Field. His extended family that remained in Europe was murdered in the Holocaust.

He was a first lieutenant and meteorologist with the 8th Air Force during World War II in the European Theater. After the war, he worked in optometry (earning a doctorate in the practice) before switching back to weather forecasting.

Field attended Brooklyn College before the war, but did not complete his degree. He held a B.S. in optometry from Columbia University and an O.D. from the Massachusetts College of Optometry.

He was on the faculty of the Albert Einstein College of Medicine in the Department of Community Health. While there, he published some of the first air pollution studies.

== Career ==
Field began his career in 1958 at WRCA-TV (renamed WNBC-TV in 1960), remaining there for over 25 years. He was a doctor of optometry (O.D.) before he became a meteorologist. On August 12, 1984, Field moved to rival WCBS-TV, where he worked for 11 years. Later, he moved to WNYW-TV for two years before ending his weather forecasting career at WWOR-TV.

Field was noted for his science reports on new technology and medicines. In the 1970s and 1980s, he hosted a nationally syndicated program on health originating from WNBC, called Health Field, and anchored a similar health news program on WLNY for the North Shore Long Island Jewish Health System, called Medical Update.

In 1988, Field hosted an educational video on fire safety and prevention, Plan to Get Out Alive, produced by WCBS in association with McDonald's and First Alert.

== Personal life and death ==
Field's wife, Joan Kaplan Field, died earlier in 2023 before her husband, after 75 years of marriage. The couple had three children: son Storm and daughters Allison and Pamela. Storm Field (born 1948) is a retired meteorologist who appeared on WABC-TV from 1976 to 1991. His daughter, Allison Field, is a meteorologist as well and appeared for a time on WCBS-TV.

Frank Field died in Florida on July 1, 2023, at the age of 100.
