= A. W. Vidmer =

American film director

A. W. "Tony" Vidmer is a film director and screenwriter whose feature film High Roller: The Stu Ungar Story was distributed by New Line Cinema in 2003. Vidmer's film chronicled the life and death of Stu Ungar, a famously genius and self-destructive poker player, and starred Michael Imperioli.

A recreational poker player, Vidmer began playing at levels 'over his head' before becoming interested in Stu Ungar and ravenously reading all the information he could find on the poker icon's life. Eventually, he embarked on the making of High Roller: The Stu Ungar Story, his first feature film.

Vidmer has gone on to create his own independent film festival, the Fylmz Festival. Inspired by a bumpy road to finding distribution for his own film, Vidmer's festival awards $100,000 and distribution to the Best Feature Film at a live festival in Nashville, TN, Feb. 8–10, 2007.

== Sources ==
- Tony Vidmer, Director of Poker Movie 'High Roller' by Murphy James, pokernews.com, April 26, 2006
- Fylmz Web site
