= Plainedge High School =

Location
- 241 Wyngate Drive; North Massapequa, New York 11758; United States; 40.69993°N 73.475389°W

Information
- Type: Public high school
- School district: Plainedge Union Free School District
- Principal: Lauren Iocco
- Teaching staff: 69.44 (on an FTE basis)
- Grades: 9–12
- Enrollment: 939 (2018–2019)
- Student to teacher ratio: 13.52
- Colors: Red, White and Black
- Mascot: Red Devils
- Newspaper: The Devils Tale
- Website: https://www.plainedgeschools.org/phs

Plainedge High School is an American public high school in the hamlet of North Massapequa, Long Island, New York, and is part of the Plainedge Union Free School District. It is the only high school in North Massapequa.

Plainedge High School's football coach, Robert Shaver, was accused of running up the score in a game against South Side High School on 25 October 2019, which ended in a score of 61–13 in favor of Plainedge. As punishment, Shaver was suspended for one game, which resulted in widespread criticism from sports journalists, and an email to all on superintendent Edward Salina's mailing list in support of Shaver.

== Notable alumni ==
- Ted Alflen – football player
- Manjul Bhargava – mathematician, Fields Medal (2014)
- Edward Byrne – New York City police officer killed in the line of duty
- Lori Carson – singer/songwriter
- Andy Glazer - poker pundit
- Steve Guttenberg – actor
- Jim Hodder – musician, drummer with Steely Dan (1972–1974)
- Hook - professional wrestler
- David Landsberg – actor/writer
- Ruby Mazur - pop artist
- John Melendez – television writer and radio personality
- Mike Rubendall – celebrity tattoo artist
- Howard Safir – former New York City police commissioner
- Duane Silverstein – international award-winning conservationist
- Richard C. Slutzky - High School Wrestling Hall of Fame
- Dan Villari – college football tight end for the Syracuse Orange
- Nora Slatkin - former Assistant Secretary of the Navy and CIA executive
