= North Massapequa, New York =

- Hamlet and census-designated place
- Nickname: North Mass
- Location in Nassau County and the state of New York

- Location on Long Island Location within the state of New York
- Coordinates: 40°42′15″N 73°28′8″W
- Country: United States
- State: New York
- County: Nassau
- Town: Oyster Bay

Area
  - Total: 3.00 sq mi (7.77 km^{2})
  - Land: 2.99 sq mi (7.75 km^{2})
  - Water: 0.0039 sq mi (0.01 km^{2})
- Elevation: 46 ft (14 m)

Population (2020)
  - Total: 17,829
  - Density: 5,954.6/sq mi (2,299.09/km^{2})
- Time zone: UTC-5 (Eastern (EST))
  - Summer (DST): UTC-4 (EDT)
- ZIP Codes: 11758 (North Massapequa); 11783 (Seaford)
- Area codes: 516, 363
- FIPS code: 36-53253
- GNIS feature ID: 0958849

North Massapequa is a hamlet and census-designated place (CDP) located within the Town of Oyster Bay in Nassau County, on Long Island, in New York, United States. It is considered part of the Greater Massapequa area, which is anchored by Massapequa. The population was 17,829 at the time of the 2020 census.

== Geography ==
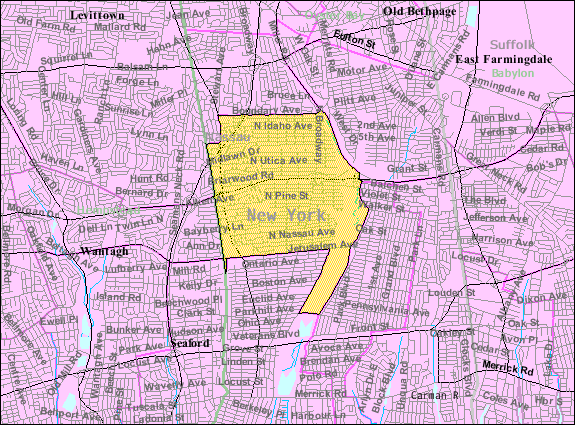
U.S. Census map of North Massapequa

According to the United States Census Bureau, the CDP has a total area of 3.0 square miles (7.8 km^{2}), all land.

== Demographics ==
Historical population
Census	Pop.	Note	%±
2000	19,152		—
2010	17,886		−6.6%
2020	17,829		−0.3%
U.S. Decennial Census

=== 2020 census ===
As of the 2020 census, North Massapequa had a population of 17,829. The median age was 43.3 years. 19.8% of residents were under the age of 18 and 18.0% of residents were 65 years of age or older. For every 100 females there were 95.9 males, and for every 100 females age 18 and over there were 93.3 males age 18 and over.

100.0% of residents lived in urban areas, while 0.0% lived in rural areas.

There were 5,963 households in North Massapequa, of which 33.1% had children under the age of 18 living in them. Of all households, 65.3% were married-couple households, 11.1% were households with a male householder and no spouse or partner present, and 20.1% were households with a female householder and no spouse or partner present. About 15.6% of all households were made up of individuals and 9.2% had someone living alone who was 65 years of age or older.

There were 6,103 housing units, of which 2.3% were vacant. The homeowner vacancy rate was 0.9% and the rental vacancy rate was 3.4%.

Racial composition as of the 2020 census
Race	Number	Percent
White	15,785	88.5%
Black or African American	116	0.7%
American Indian and Alaska Native	18	0.1%
Asian	466	2.6%
Native Hawaiian and Other Pacific Islander	0	0.0%
Some other race	334	1.9%
Two or more races	1,110	6.2%
Hispanic or Latino (of any race)	1,541	8.6%

=== 2000 census ===
As of the census of 2000, there were 19,152 people, 6,281 households, and 5,288 families residing in the CDP. The population density was 6,333.0 inhabitants per square mile (2,445.2/km^{2}). There were 6,333 housing units at an average density of 2,094.1 per square mile (808.5/km^{2}). The racial makeup of the CDP was 97.32% White, 0.22% African American, 0.02% Native American, 1.15% Asian, 0.55% from other races, and 0.74% from two or more races. Hispanic or Latino of any race were 3.23% of the population.

There were 6,281 households, out of which 36.5% had children under the age of 18 living with them, 71.9% were married couples living together, 9.3% had a female householder with no husband present, and 15.8% were non-families. 13.2% of all households were made up of individuals, and 7.8% had someone living alone who was 65 years of age or older. The average household size was 3.05 and the average family size was 3.33.

In the CDP, the population was spread out, with 24.4% under the age of 18, 6.2% from 18 to 24, 30.4% from 25 to 44, 22.6% from 45 to 64, and 16.4% who were 65 years of age or older. The median age was 39 years. For every 100 females, there were 93.1 males. For every 100 females age 18 and over, there were 90.3 males.

The median income for a household in the CDP was $70,825, and the median income for a family was $76,958. Males had a median income of $54,754 versus $35,859 for females. The per capita income for the CDP was $25,957. About 1.5% of families and 2.9% of the population were below the poverty line, including 2.4% of those under age 18 and 3.0% of those age 65 or over.

=== Ancestry ===
Like the other Massapequas, North Massapequa is predominantly Italian American, with nearly 50% of residents claiming Italian ancestry.

== Education ==
North Massapequa is located within the boundaries of (and is thus served by) the Farmingdale Union Free School District, the Massapequa Union Free School District, and the Plainedge Union Free School District. As such, children who reside within the hamlet and attend public schools go to school in one of these three districts, depending on where they live within North Massapequa.

== Notable people ==
- Manjul Bhargava, mathematician, studied at the local high school
- Steve Guttenberg, actor, grew up in North Massapequa and attended Plainedge High School (Class of 1976).
- John Melendez, also known as "Stuttering John", celebrity who came to fame as a regular member of The Howard Stern Show. Attended Plainedge High School (Class of 1983).
- Dan Nigro, record producer and songwriter, was born in North Massapequa
- Joe Pantorno, sports editor for amNewYork newspaper, grew up in North Massapequa
- Joseph Saladino, New York State Assemblyman
- Marilyn Singer, author of children's books, grew up in North Massapequa
