= Massapequa, New York =

- Hamlet and census-designated place
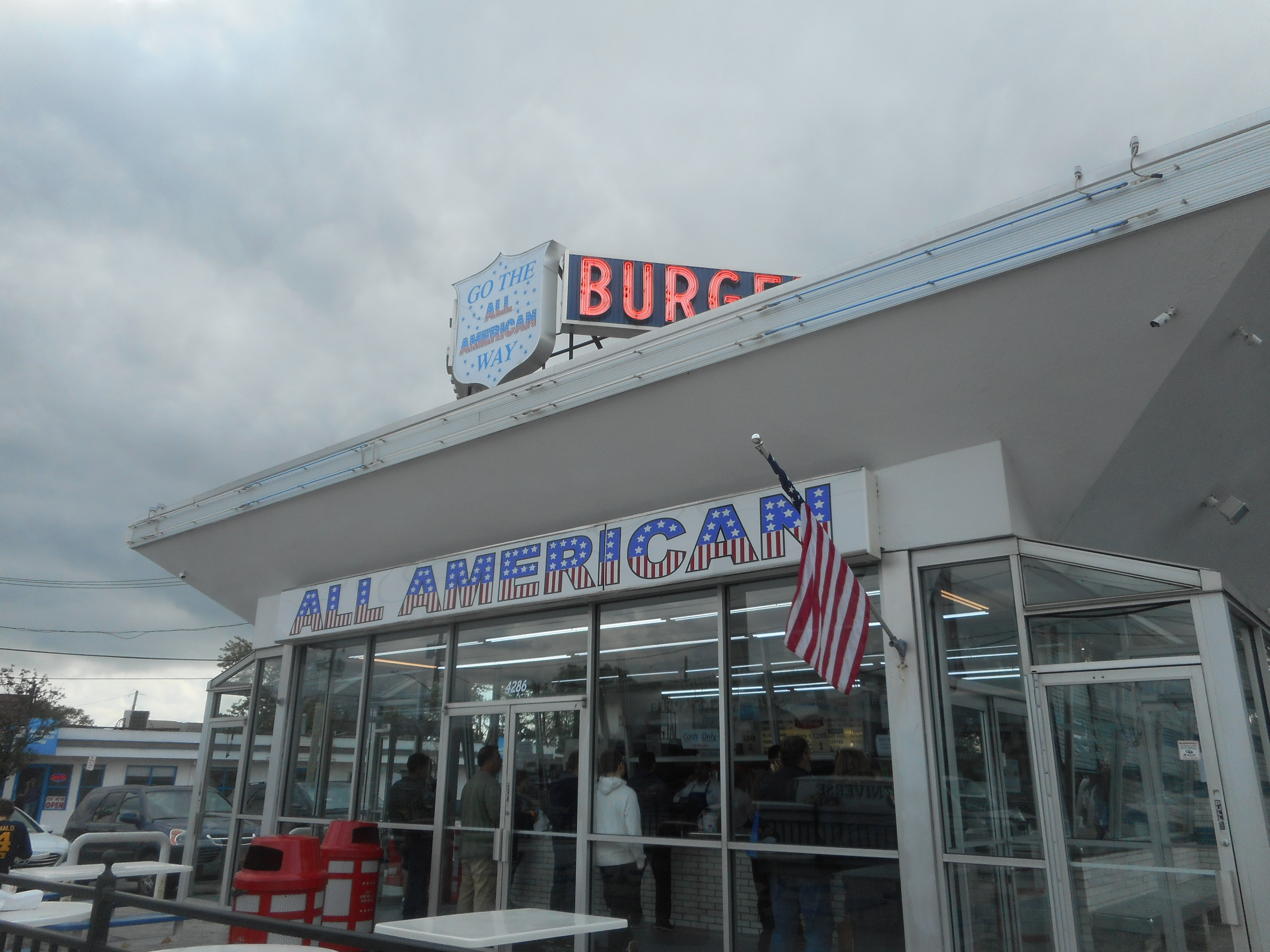
- All-American Hamburger Drive-In in Massapequa
- Nicknames: Pequa; Matzah Pizza
- Location in Nassau County and the state of New York

- Location on Long Island Location within the state of New York
- Coordinates: 40.670403°N 73.47115°W
- Country: United States
- State: New York
- County: Nassau
- Town: Oyster Bay

Area
  - Total: 3.99 sq mi (10.34 km^{2})
  - Land: 3.56 sq mi (9.22 km^{2})
  - Water: 0.43 sq mi (1.12 km^{2})
- Elevation: 26 ft (8 m)

Population (2020)
  - Total: 21,355
  - Density: 6,001/sq mi (2,316.9/km^{2})
- Time zone: UTC-5 (Eastern (EST))
  - Summer (DST): UTC-4 (EDT)
- ZIP Code: 11758
- Area codes: 516, 363
- FIPS code: 36-45986
- GNIS feature ID: 0956651

Massapequa (/ˌmæsəˈpiːkwə/, mass-ə-PEEK-wə) is a hamlet and census-designated place (CDP) in the Town of Oyster Bay in Nassau County, on the South Shore of Long Island, in New York, United States. The population of the CDP was 21,355 at the time of the 2020 census.

== History ==
The name Massapequa or historically Marsapeague means “great water land”.

The first occupants were a band of Algonquian speakers, the Massapequa people, one of the 13 tribes of Long Island, a subgroup of the Lenape people. At first, most of the Massapequa people were friendly and helpful to the Europeans, but then, around 1658, merchants from the Town of Oyster Bay tricked Chief Tackapausha into selling the land. He tried to rectify this misunderstanding, but remained unsuccessful.

In 1670 (35 years after the Europeans initially settled there), only a few Native Americans were left on the Island.

In 1969, drainage work at Massapequa Lake discovered a cache of 184 jasper blades arranged in horizontal rows a short distance below the surface. The artifacts have been dated between approximately 75 BCE and 400 CE and provide the only confirmed archaeological evidence of Indigenous Woodland-period activity in the Massapequa area.

From the 1890s, real estate companies promoted new residential districts around the railroad, running Sunday excursion trains and developing housing near Hicksville Road. The Massapequa Long Island Rail Road station, built in 1896 by the Floyd-Jones family, later was used as a sales center for several major developers marketing lots to prospective home buyers.

In the late nineteenth and early twentieth centuries, Massapequa developed as a small resort community welcoming visitors from Manhattan and Brooklyn. The best known establishment was the Massapequa Hotel, a 300-room summer hotel that was built in 1888 on Ocean Avenue south of Merrick Road, which offered a dining room, dance hall and recreational activities such as golfing, swimming at a nearby beach, boating, cycling and fishing in Massapequa Lake. The hotel's business declined in the early 1900s, and it closed in 1914. Sections of the building were later reused to construct Panchard's Hotel at Merrick and Hicksville Roads.

After World War II, Massapequa experienced rapid growth. Its population rose from about 3,500 in 1940 to roughly 40,000 by 1960 due to new housing construction. Many residents in the mid-20th century worked in agriculture or at nearby aircraft manufacturing plants.

Development of the Harbor Green area during the 1930s uncovered Native American burials and evidence of an associated settlement, portions of which were destroyed during construction. The nearby Fort Massapeag Archeological Site was preserved as Sunset Park and designated a National Historic Landmark in 1993.

== Geography ==
According to the United States Census Bureau, the CDP has a total area of 4.0 square miles (10 km^{2}), of which 3.7 square miles (9.6 km^{2}) is land and 0.4 square miles (1.0 km^{2}), or 9.20%, is water.

Massapequa and nearby places with "Massapequa" in their names are sometimes collectively called "the Massapequas".

=== Neighborhoods ===
Named residential neighborhoods in southern Massapequa include Biltmore Shores, Harbor Green, and Bar Harbor.

=== Climate ===
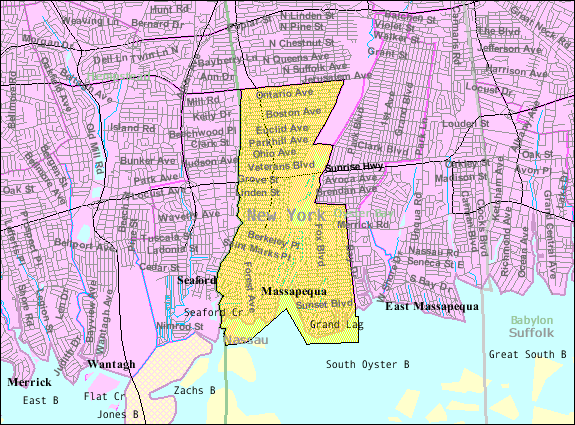
U.S. Census map of Massapequa

Massapequa has a temperate climate that is very similar to other coastal areas of the Northeastern United States; it has warm, humid summers and cold winters, but the Atlantic Ocean helps bring afternoon sea breezes that temper the heat in the warmer months and limit the frequency and severity of thunderstorms. However, severe thunderstorms are not uncommon, especially when they approach the island from the mainland (Bronx, Westchester and Connecticut) in the northwest. In the wintertime, temperatures are warmer than areas further inland (especially at night and in the early morning hours), often causing a snowstorm further inland to fall as rain on the island. However, measurable snowfalls every winter, and in many winters one or more intense storms called Nor'easters may occasionally produce blizzard conditions with snowfalls of 1–2 feet (30–60 cm) and near-hurricane-force winds. On average, 28" of snow falls each winter in Massapequa. Long Island temperatures also vary from west to east, with the western part of the island warmer on most occasions than the east. This is due to two factors; one because the western part is closer to the mainland and the other is the western part is more developed causing what is known as the urban heat island effect.

This climate is classified as hot-summer humid continental (Dfa) which borders upon a humid subtropical climate (Cfa) on the coast. Average monthly temperatures in the central CDP range from 31.4 °F in January to 74.3 °F in July.

On August 25, 2006, a small F0 tornado struck Massapequa.

On Monday, October 29, 2012, Hurricane Sandy devastated much of Massapequa – especially south of Merrick Road, where surging floodwaters rose both along the shore and along the numerous canals that run a mile inland. Schools were closed for several days or even weeks. Many residents remained without power for weeks after the storm because of downed power lines. Hundreds of houses and buildings sustained major flood damage and had to be gutted and renovated during the ensuing year.

== Demographics ==
Historical population
Census	Pop.	Note	%±
2000	22,652		—
2010	21,685		−4.3%
2020	21,355		−1.5%
U.S. Decennial Census

=== 2020 census ===
As of the 2020 census, Massapequa had a population of 21,355. The median age was 43.7 years. 20.9% of residents were under the age of 18 and 18.0% were 65 years of age or older. For every 100 females there were 95.3 males, and for every 100 females age 18 and over there were 93.0 males age 18 and over.

100.0% of residents lived in urban areas, while 0.0% lived in rural areas.

There were 7,152 households in Massapequa, of which 35.1% had children under the age of 18 living in them. Of all households, 67.4% were married-couple households, 10.0% were households with a male householder and no spouse or partner present, and 19.2% were households with a female householder and no spouse or partner present. About 14.1% of all households were made up of individuals and 8.2% had someone living alone who was 65 years of age or older.

There were 7,375 housing units, of which 3.0% were vacant. The homeowner vacancy rate was 1.1% and the rental vacancy rate was 1.1%.

Racial composition as of the 2020 census
Race	Number	Percent
White	19,214	90.0%
Black or African American	123	0.6%
American Indian and Alaska Native	17	0.1%
Asian	435	2.0%
Native Hawaiian and Other Pacific Islander	4	0.0%
Some other race	303	1.4%
Two or more races	1,259	5.9%
Hispanic or Latino (of any race)	1,586	7.4%

=== 2023 American Community Survey ===
Based on the 2023 American Community Survey 5-year estimates, the median age in Massapequa was 43.6 years. 20.6% of residents were under the age of 18 and 17.1% were 65 years of age or older. The estimated median household income was $179,844, and approximately 2.9% of residents were living below the poverty line. The survey reported about 7,242 occupied housing units, with an average family size of 3.36 persons.

=== Ethnic communities ===
Because it has large Italian and Jewish communities, the town is sometimes referred to as "matzah pizza".

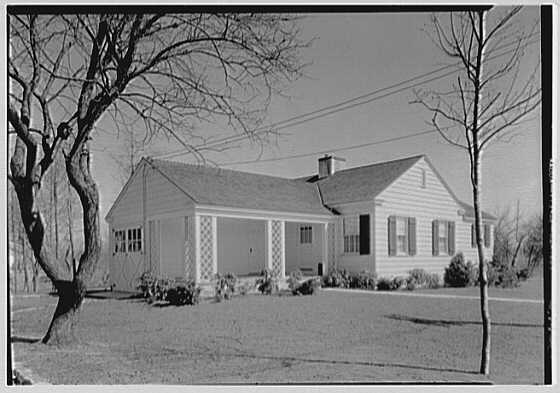
House in Massapequa, 1934

=== 2000 census ===
As of the census of 2000, there were 22,652 people, 7,417 households, and 6,297 families residing in the CDP. The population density was 6,207.5 inhabitants per square mile (2,396.7/km^{2}). There were 7,514 housing units at an average density of 2,059.1 per square mile (795.0/km^{2}). The racial makeup of the CDP was 97.42% White, 0.17% African American, 0.02% Native American, 1.27% Asian, 0.03% Pacific Islander, 0.37% from other races, and 0.73% from two or more races. 2.59% of the population were Hispanic or Latino of any race.

There were 7,417 households, out of which 38.3% had children under the age of 18 living with them, 73.4% were married couples living together, 8.5% had a female householder with no husband present, and 15.1% were non-families. Of all households, 12.5% were made up of individuals, and 6.9% had someone living alone who was 65 years of age or older. The average household size was 3.05 and the average family size was 3.33.

In the CDP, the population was spread, with 25.6% under the age of 18, 5.9% from 18 to 24, 29.5% from 25 to 44, 24.7% from 45 to 64, and 14.3% who were 65 years of age or older. The median age was 41 years as of 2007. For every 100 females, there were 94.9 males. For every 100 females age 18 and over, there were 110.0 males.

The median income for a household in the CDP was $107,181, and the median income for a family was $116,266. Males had a median income of $78,859 versus $57,016 for females. The per capita income for the CDP was $42,169. 2.9% of the population and 1.6% of families were below the poverty line.

== Education ==
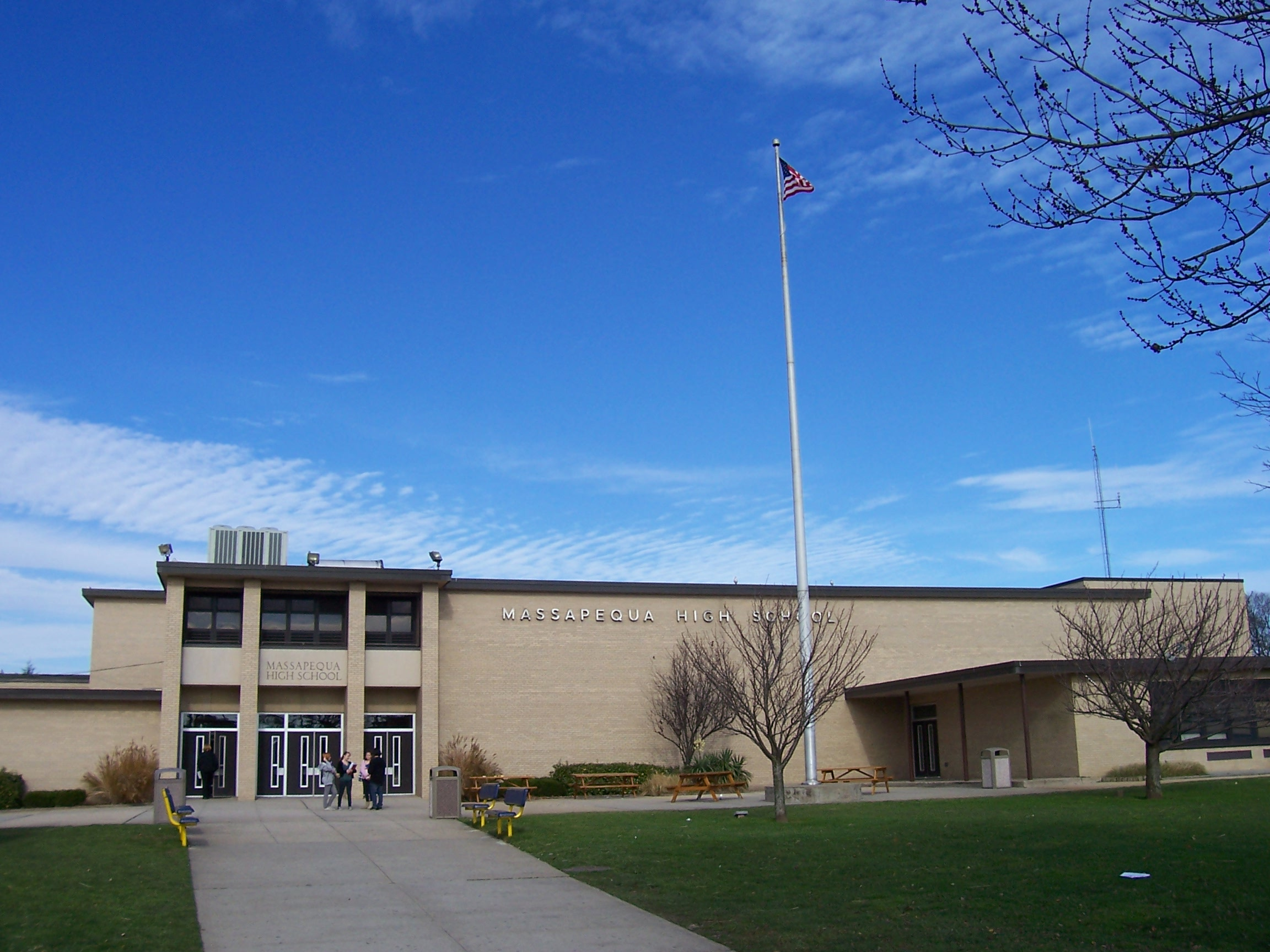
Massapequa High School

The majority of Massapequa is in the Massapequa Union Free School District. A small portion is in the Plainedge Union Free School District.

Massapequa residents originally attended schools in neighboring towns. Even after the creation of the Massapequa Union Free School District (also known as MSD) appropriately aged students were often sent to schools such as Amityville Memorial High School because a high school in Massapequa did not exist. At first, students went only to Amityville, but after 1953 they were given the option of attending schools in towns like Freeport and Baldwin and at Willington Mepham High School in Bellmore.

MSD constructed its first modern multi-room building in the mid 1920s. It was built on Massapequa Avenue, which is why it received the name "Massapequa Avenue School". After the construction of Massapequa High School in 1955 this original school was renamed to "Fairfield School" to avoid confusion with the similar names.

Currently MSD owns and operates 6 elementary schools, one middle school, and one high school; however, this number has changed throughout its history.

Active MSD Schools:

- Massapequa High School: established in 1955, graduated their first class in 1956, and teaches students in grades 10-12.
- Massapequa High School - Ames Campus: renamed in 1977, teaches students in grade 9.
- Berner Middle School: renamed in 1977, teaches students grades 6-8.
- Birch Lane Elementary School: established in 1956, teaches students grades K-5.
- East Lake Elementary School: established in 1955, teaches students grades K-5.
- Fairfield Elementary School: established in 1925, teaches students grades K-5.
- Lockhart Elementary School: established in 1957, teaches students grades K-5.
- McKenna Elementary School: renamed in 1977, teaches students grades K-5.
- Unqua Elementary School: established in 1952, teaches students grades K-5.

Former Names of Active MSD Schools:

- Massapequa Jr./Sr. High School: established 1955
- Berner High School: established in 1962
- J. Lewis Ames Junior High School (post-expansion version of Parkside Elementary School): renamed in 1957
- McKenna Junior High School: established 1958
- Parkside Elementary School (was expanded and renamed into J. Lewis James Junior High School in 1957): established December 1950
- East Lake High School (January 1953 to June 1955)

Former Schools Not Used by MSD:

- Hawthorn Elementary School: established in 1954, taught grades K-6, building leased to the Nassau County Police Department Seventh Precinct for cadet training 2006-2022, parking lot leased to Massapequa Fire District during station remodeling.
- Carman Road School: established in 1956, shut down in 1978, leased to Nassau BOCES for special education, voted on and sold to Nassau BOCES in late 2010s

== Infrastructure ==
=== Transportation ===
The Massapequa station on the Long Island Rail Road's Babylon Branch is located within the hamlet.

State routes 27, 27A, 105, 107, and 135 serve the town.

The Bethpage State Parkway and Southern State Parkway are in the town.

Several NICE bus routes also serve Massapequa.

== Notable people ==
- Sal Alosi – former New York Jets strength & conditioning coach
- Brian Baldinger – football player
- Baldwin brothers (Alec, Daniel, William, and Stephen) – actors
- Phil Baroni – MMA fighter
- Dakota Barnathan – soccer player
- Matt Bennett – actor
- Peter Brennan – U.S. Secretary of Labor, died here on October 2, 1996
- Joey Buttafuoco – involved in Amy Fisher scandal
- Candy Darling – actress in Andy Warhol films
- Roy DeMeo – mobster
- Jennifer DeSena – Attorney and 38th Town Supervisor of North Hempstead, New York
- Neil Diamond – musician, lived in Massapequa with first wife Jaye Posner
- Joe Donnelly – U.S. Senator from Indiana
- Michael Dougherty – screenwriter
- Stanley Drucker – longtime principal clarinetist for the New York Philharmonic
- Elliot Easton – The Cars' lead guitarist
- Andre Eglevsky – ballet dancer
- Frank Field – weather man
- Storm Field – weather man
- William Gaddis – novelist
- Carlo Gambino – mobster
- Andy Glazer – poker player
- Steve Guttenberg – actor
- Jessica Hahn – model
- Marvin Hamlisch – composer
- William Johnston – novelist
- Thomas Jones (1731–1792) – historian
- Christine Jorgensen – transgender pioneer
- Charlie Kaufman – screenwriter and director
- Sean Kenniff – physician
- Brian Kilmeade – co-host of Fox and Friends
- Ron Kovic - Vietnam veteran, anti-war activist, author
- Brian Langtry – lacrosse player
- Mark LoMonaco – pro wrestler
- Dennis Michael Lynch – filmmaker
- Joe Maca – soccer player, died here on July 13, 1982
- "Stuttering" John Melendez (b. 1965) - radio personality and entertainer
- Sonny Milano – (born 1996) National Hockey League forward for the Washington Capitals
- James Naughtin – aka Erik Rhodes, pornographic actor and director
- Bob Nelson – comedian
- Charles Nolan – fashion designer
- Peggy Noonan – political speechwriter and conservative columnist
- Rob O'Gara – professional ice hockey player for the New York Rangers
- Maureen Ohlhausen – (Kraemer) acting chair of the Federal Trade Commission
- Slim Jim Phantom – musician
- Eric Reid – Miami Heat television announcer
- Chris Richards – musician, Suffocation bassist
- Lee Rocker – musician
- Angelo Dominick Roncallo – U.S. representative
- Doc Schneider – Major League Lacrosse goaltender
- Jerry Seinfeld – comedian and actor
- Peter Senerchia (Tazz) – pro wrestler and announcer
- Matt Serra – former MMA champion
- Brian Setzer – rockabilly icon, The Stray Cats
- Helen Slater – actress, Supergirl
- Bobby Slayton – comedian and actor
- Dee Snider – lead singer, Twisted Sister
- Robert Sobel – author
- Casey Stern – SiriusXM radio personality
- Richie Supa – Singer/Songwriter asso/Aerosmith
- Buddy Tate – jazz saxophonist
- Wesley Walker – former wide receiver for the New York Jets
- Christie Welsh – former U.S. Women's Soccer forward
- Danny Vitiello – soccer player
