= Barnum Island, New York =

- Hamlet and census-designated place
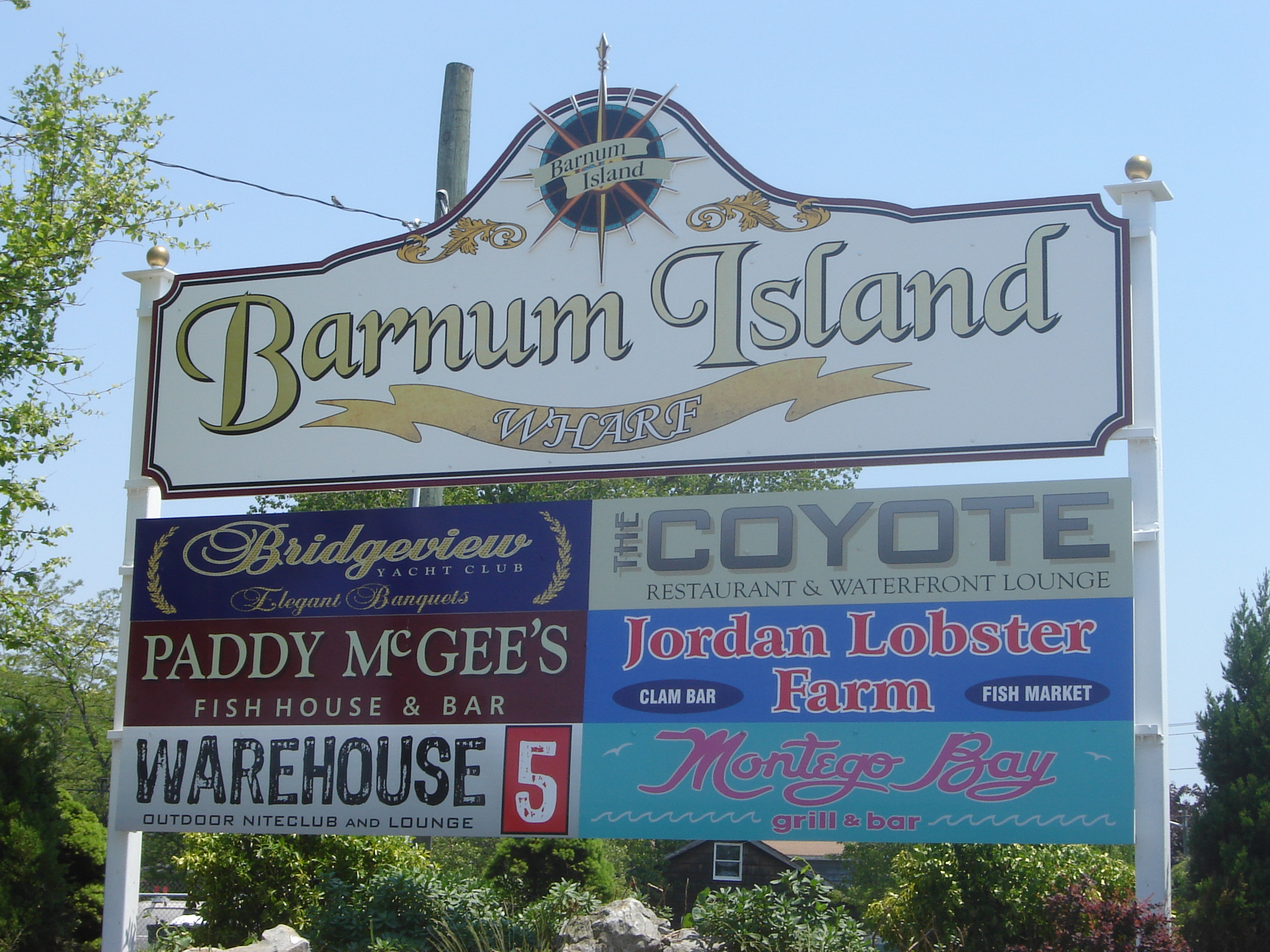

- Location in Nassau County and the state of New York.

- Location within the state of New York
- Coordinates: 40°36′18″N 73°38′37″W
- Country: United States
- State: New York
- County: Nassau County, New York
- Town: Hempstead

Area
  - Total: 1.24 sq mi (3.21 km^{2})
  - Land: 0.86 sq mi (2.24 km^{2})
  - Water: 0.37 sq mi (0.97 km^{2})
- Elevation: 7 ft (2.1 m)

Population (2020)
  - Total: 2,590
  - Density: 2,992.6/sq mi (1,155.44/km^{2})
- Time zone: UTC-5 (EST)
  - Summer (DST): UTC-4 (EDT)
- ZIP Code: 11558 (Island Park)
- Area code: 516
- FIPS code: 36-04550
- GNIS feature ID: 2389175

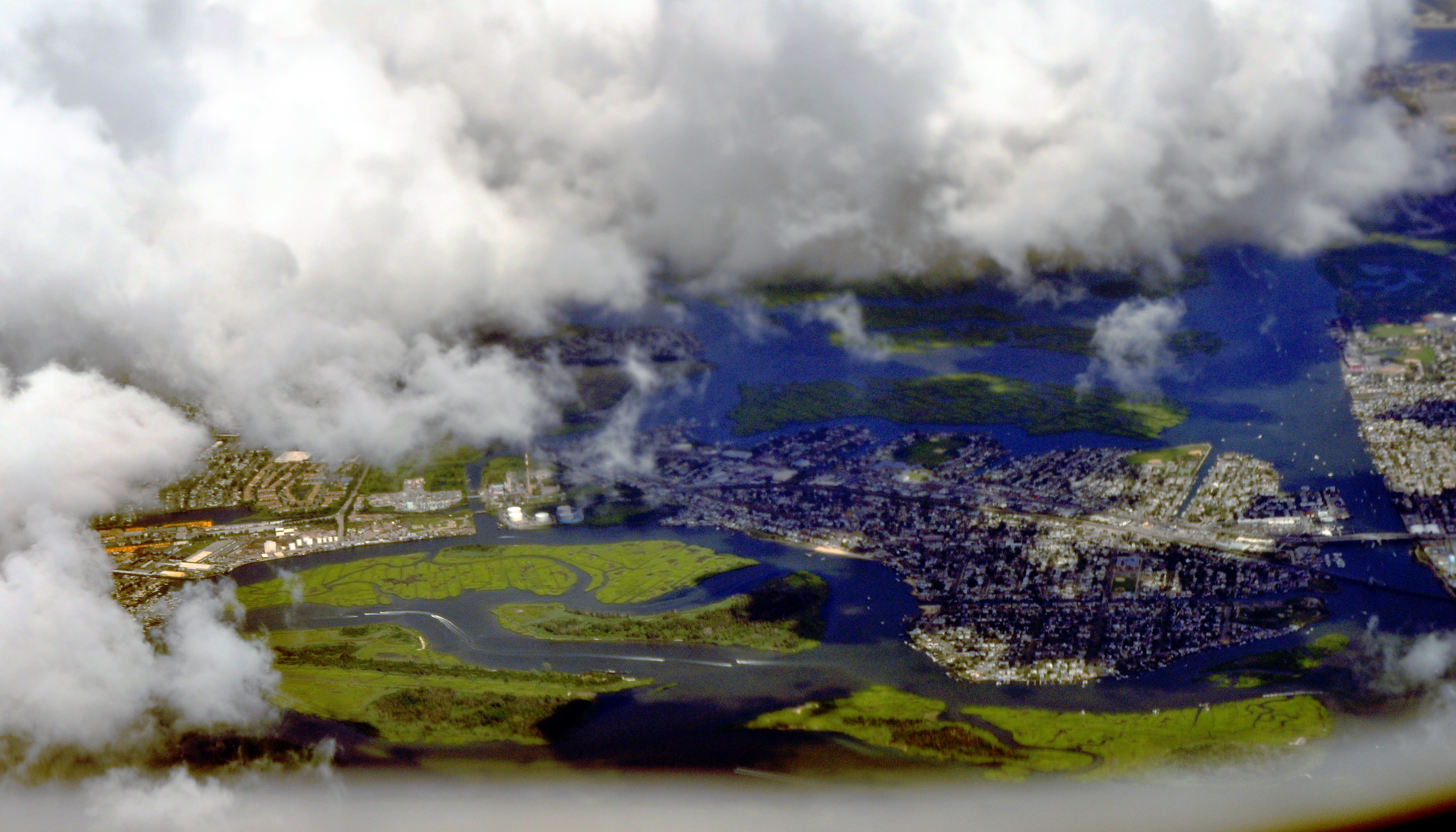
Aerial view of Barnum Island and Harbor Isle from the west.

Barnum Island is a hamlet and census-designated place (CDP) in Nassau County, New York, United States. The population was 2,590 at the 2020 census. It occupies the eastern portion of an island situated between Long Island and Long Beach. That island, previously known in its entirety as Hog Island, consists entirely of the communities of Barnum Island and Island Park.

Barnum Island is an unincorporated area of the Town of Hempstead. Most of Barnum Island is separated from the Village of Island Park by the LIRR's Long Beach Branch rail line to Long Beach.

Barnum Island has its own fire district and school district, but is under contract with the Village of Island Park for fire and education services for its residents. Barnum Island is included in the Island Park School District and ZIP code (11558).

The E.F. Barrett Power Station is located within the hamlet.

== History ==
Previously called Hog Island, after the feral pigs introduced by early European explorers to the Native Americans, it was later renamed for Sarah Ann Baldwin Barnum. It was also sometimes called Jekyl Island, after the name of the development company that bought it from the county.

Between 1851 and 1870, Sarah Ann's husband Peter owned large parcels of land on Long Island, though his primary business was a Manhattan clothier. Sarah Ann arranged the purchase of Hog Island for use as a "poor farm" – a self-supporting almshouse, a social innovation for that period, and the island was renamed in her honor.

Local lore connects the island's name to P.T. Barnum, the circus impresario, but this is incorrect, and likely due to confusion between "PT" and "PC" (Peter C.).

The county discontinued the almshouse and sold the island to the Jekyl Island Realty Company in 1898 for $40,000. The company renamed it Jekyl Island. The island changed hands several times in 1909, Jekyl sold it to a syndicate of developers for $120,000, who in turn sold it for $650,000 in 1911. (There may have been an interim sale in 1910 as well.) Minimal development at that time included construction of several canals, before work was abandoned. One of those canals divides the Harbor Isle section from Island Park.

New developers bought the island in 1921, and started building about 10,000 properties built in the 700 acre Island Park section in the center of the island starting in 1922. It was in use as a summer resort by 1925., Island Park was incorporated as a village in 1926.

The rest of the island remains unincorporated, with the western portion known as Harbor Island, and the eastern portion retaining the name Barnum Island. However, all three make up the original Hog Island/Barnum Island, and are part of the Town of Hempstead.

The entire island was flooded with two to eight feet of water and sewage by Hurricane Sandy.

== Geography ==
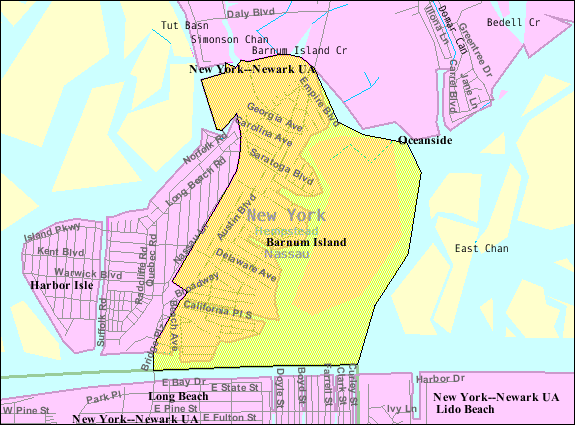
U.S. Census Map

According to the United States Census Bureau, the CDP has a total area of 1.3 square miles (3.4 km^{2}), of which 0.9 square miles (2.3 km^{2}) is land and 0.4 square miles (1.0 km^{2}) (28.24%) is water.

== Demographics ==
Historical population
Census	Pop.	Note	%±
2000	2,487		—
2010	2,414		−2.9%
2020	2,590		7.3%
U.S. Decennial Census

=== Racial and ethnic composition ===
Barnum Island CDP, New York – Racial and ethnic composition Note: the US Census treats Hispanic/Latino as an ethnic category. This table excludes Latinos from the racial categories and assigns them to a separate category. Hispanics/Latinos may be of any race.
Race / Ethnicity (NH = Non-Hispanic)	Pop 2000	Pop 2010	Pop 2020	% 2000	% 2010	% 2020
White alone (NH)	2,126	1,914	1,762	85.48%	79.29%	68.03%
Black or African American alone (NH)	8	22	69	0.32%	0.91%	2.66%
Native American or Alaska Native alone (NH)	0	2	4	0.00%	0.08%	0.15%
Asian alone (NH)	56	64	156	2.25%	2.65%	6.02%
Native Hawaiian or Pacific Islander alone (NH)	1	0	0	0.04%	0.00%	0.00%
Other race alone (NH)	7	16	34	0.28%	0.66%	1.31%
Mixed race or Multiracial (NH)	33	19	61	1.33%	0.79%	2.36%
Hispanic or Latino (any race)	256	377	504	10.29%	15.62%	19.46%
Total	2,487	2,414	2,590	100.00%	100.00%	100.00%

=== 2020 census ===
As of the 2020 census, Barnum Island had a population of 2,590. The population density was 2,877.7 inhabitants per square mile (1,111.1/km^{2}). There were 1,062 housing units at an average density of 1,180 per square mile (460/km^{2}).

The median age was 47.4 years. 14.8% of residents were under the age of 18 and 21.4% were 65 years of age or older. For every 100 females there were 96.8 males, and for every 100 females age 18 and over there were 96.7 males age 18 and over.

100.0% of residents lived in urban areas, while 0.0% lived in rural areas.

There were 1,026 households, of which 24.1% had children under the age of 18 living in them. Of all households, 48.9% were married-couple households, 19.6% were households with a male householder and no spouse or partner present, and 25.8% were households with a female householder and no spouse or partner present. About 26.1% of all households were made up of individuals and 10.0% had someone living alone who was 65 years of age or older.

There were 1,062 housing units, of which 3.4% were vacant. The homeowner vacancy rate was 1.8% and the rental vacancy rate was 1.3%.

=== Income and poverty ===
The median income for a household in the CDP was $102,955. About 7.9% of the population were below the poverty line, including 19.9% of those under age 18 and 3.9% of those age 65 or over.

== Nunley's Ferris wheel ==
Nunley's Ferris wheel, formerly located at Nunley's Carousel and Amusement Park on the Baldwin-Freeport, New York border, is now located in Barnum Island, in Baldwin, New York. Nassau County purchased Nunley's Carousel in 1995, restored it, and reopened it in 2009 at the Cradle of Aviation Museum in Garden City, New York. Other Nunley's rides and games were sold at auction after the park closed in 1995 and are now scattered all over the country.

== Education ==
Barnum Island is in Island Park Union Free School District. High school students go to Long Beach High School of the Long Beach City School District.

From circa 1968 to 2008, the Island Park district sent high school students only to West Hempstead High School, operated by the West Hempstead Union Free School District. From circa 2008 to 2018, people living in the Island Park district could select between Long Beach and West Hempstead for high school education. In 2018 the Island Park school district stopped paying for Island Park residents to have the West Hempstead choice, and this was effective the 2019-2020 school year.
