= Hog Island (New York) =

Two islands by this name near the Rockaways

Coordinates: 40.601°N 73.654°W

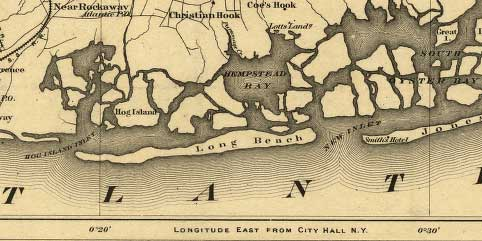
Map of Barnum Island, Nassau County (then known as Hog Island), 1873

Hog Island was the name of two islands near Long Island, New York until the 1890s. One is the present day Barnum Island, which includes the villages of Island Park and Harbor Isle in Nassau County. The other was a mile-long (1600 m) barrier island that existed to the south of Rockaway Beach in Queens before being mostly destroyed by the 1893 New York hurricane and completely lost to erosion and storm damage by 1902.

== Barnum Island ==
The Barnum Island/Island Park/Harbor Isle "Hog Island" was used by the Native Americans to raise pigs, once they had been introduced by Europeans and left to run feral. It later became a small farming area. In 1874 Sarah Ann Baldwin Barnum (unrelated to P.T. Barnum, despite local lore) purchased the property. A syndicate of businessmen were about to bid $70,000 for the property, but she persuaded the owner to sell it to her for use as a working farm, to house and employ the poor. While she made the purchase with $13,360 of her own money, she immediately resold it to the Queens County government for the same price; at the time, Nassau was part of Queens.

In 1898, the county closed the almshouse, and sold the property to developers for $40,000.

In 1926, much of the island was incorporated as the Village of Island Park. The remainder is still unincorporated: the northeast portion of the island continues to be known as Barnum Island, while the western portion is called Harbor Island. All three are part of the Town of Hempstead.

== General information ==
The western tip of Long Island is home to two of New York's five boroughs (Brooklyn (Kings County) and Queens). The central part of the island is occupied by Nassau County, and the eastern part is occupied by Suffolk County. In colloquial speech, the term "Long Island" usually refers to the latter two counties. Brooklyn and Queens are named separately (because they became administrative parts of New York City).

Nassau County is more urban and populated than Suffolk County, which has an agricultural lifestyle. The areas on the south shore are heavily swamped, dominated by white sandy beaches and archipelagos. These areas are still inhabited by old families known from the era of the struggle for independence. Much of the land on the north shore belongs to the American and European aristocracy. Today, the region's major natural resources are made available to the general public: public parks, nurseries, nature reserves, and museums have been opened.

After World War II, the non-New York City area of Long Island experienced significant economic and population growth. Nassau County was the fastest-growing county in terms of population from the 1950s to the 1970s. Suffolk remained largely an agricultural area until 1990, especially in the eastern part. Summer tourism is very popular here.

Long Island is known for its high standard of living. Nassau County is the third wealthiest county in the United States and has the second highest tax rate in the country.

In recent years, the northern areas of Suffolk, formerly occupied by potato fields, have been converted into wine plantations. And southern Suffolk is famous for its beach resorts, including the world-famous Hamptons (home to an annual jazz festival) and Montauk (Montauk Point Lighthouse).

== Lost island ==
=== History ===
Over time, the natural movements of the sea built up a large sandbar; reports suggest that it began to emerge from the ocean during the Civil War period. It was about 1,000 feet south off the Rockaway shore. Eventually, it grew to about a mile long (parallel to the Rockaways) and several hundred feet wide. Shaped like a hog's back, it came to be known as Hog Island, or sometimes as Far Rockaway Beach Island.

The island attracted developers of various seafront beach resort businesses, including leisure pavilions, bathing facilities, saloons, and restaurants. It was a favorite getaway of Tammany Hall politicians, and many "backroom deals" were actually concluded in the open air here.

A winter storm in early 1893 severely damaged the island. In late August 1893, several hurricanes were simultaneously active in the Atlantic Ocean. On August 22, 1893, strong waves covered Hog Island and reduced its size but left it generally intact, though accounts conflict on the level of damage.

The following evening, during the overnight hours, a devastating hurricane made landfall in New York City, lasting from about 8:00 PM Wednesday to 8:00 AM Thursday. 30-foot (9m) waves were reported at Coney Island as far as 200 yards (180 m) inland, destroying the elevated railroad there, and the East River crested the sea wall in the Astoria district; waist-high water was reported in the streets of the City of Brooklyn.

Much of Hog Island disappeared during the storm, leaving the remaining island greatly reduced in area. News reports included a dramatic rescue from the island.

After the 1893 storm, some redevelopment occurred on the reduced Hog Island. It was further damaged in an 1896 storm, and believed to have eroded away entirely in 1902.

Maps from the 1880s appear to show that Hog Island was attached to Long Beach and Far Rockaway around the Wavecrest section of the Rockaways. Thus, Hog Island was a barrier beach that connected Long Beach to Far Rockaway. This created the Far Rockaway Bay (now known as Far Rockaway Inlet). 1880s maps also show piers/boardwalks allowing people to walk to the barrier beach (Hog Island). Various storms during the 1880s and 1890s eroded the barrier beach (affecting Norton Basin, which at that time turned the rest of the Rockaways into an island ala Coney Island Creek) and submerged the sandbar connecting Long Beach and Far Rockaway (around Beach 32-35 sts.). The final result was that Long Beach became an island and Norton Basin was covered with sand and thus was no longer accessible to boats travelling therein. Since the 1890s, Far Rockaway has been connected to the rest of the Rockaways.

=== Rediscovery ===
In the mid-1990s, after the nor'easters of December 1992 and March 1993 heavily damaged the coast of Rockaway, the Army Corps of Engineers began rebuilding Rockaway Peninsula beaches. They used sands dredged close to shore. Professor Nicholas Coch of Queens College, along with local undergraduate students, was observing the work and its results, replenishing of the beaches along Rockaway when they noticed peculiar items along the coast. The group uncovered hundreds of different artifacts including whiskey bottles, beer mugs, and even a hurricane lamp. The majority of the items were dated around the late 19th century. Coch believes they came from Hog Island, but admits they could have been the result of the 1893 storm's devastation in other nearby resort areas.

Curious about their findings, the Queens College group started to unravel the history of Hog Island. Their research also led to a reassessment of the frequency of major hurricanes in the New York City area (see Analysis, below).

=== Analysis ===
The city of New York has averaged a major hurricane approximately every 70 to 80 years throughout its history. It was predicted in 2005 that if the city were to be directly hit by another hurricane of the intensity of the one in 1893, which destroyed Hog Island, the damage would likely be enormous. In 2012, the effects of Hurricane Sandy in New York were very destructive but not a worst-case scenario, especially in terms of wind. A landfalling Category 3 or higher would be far more destructive.
