= Harbor Isle, New York =

- Hamlet and census-designated place
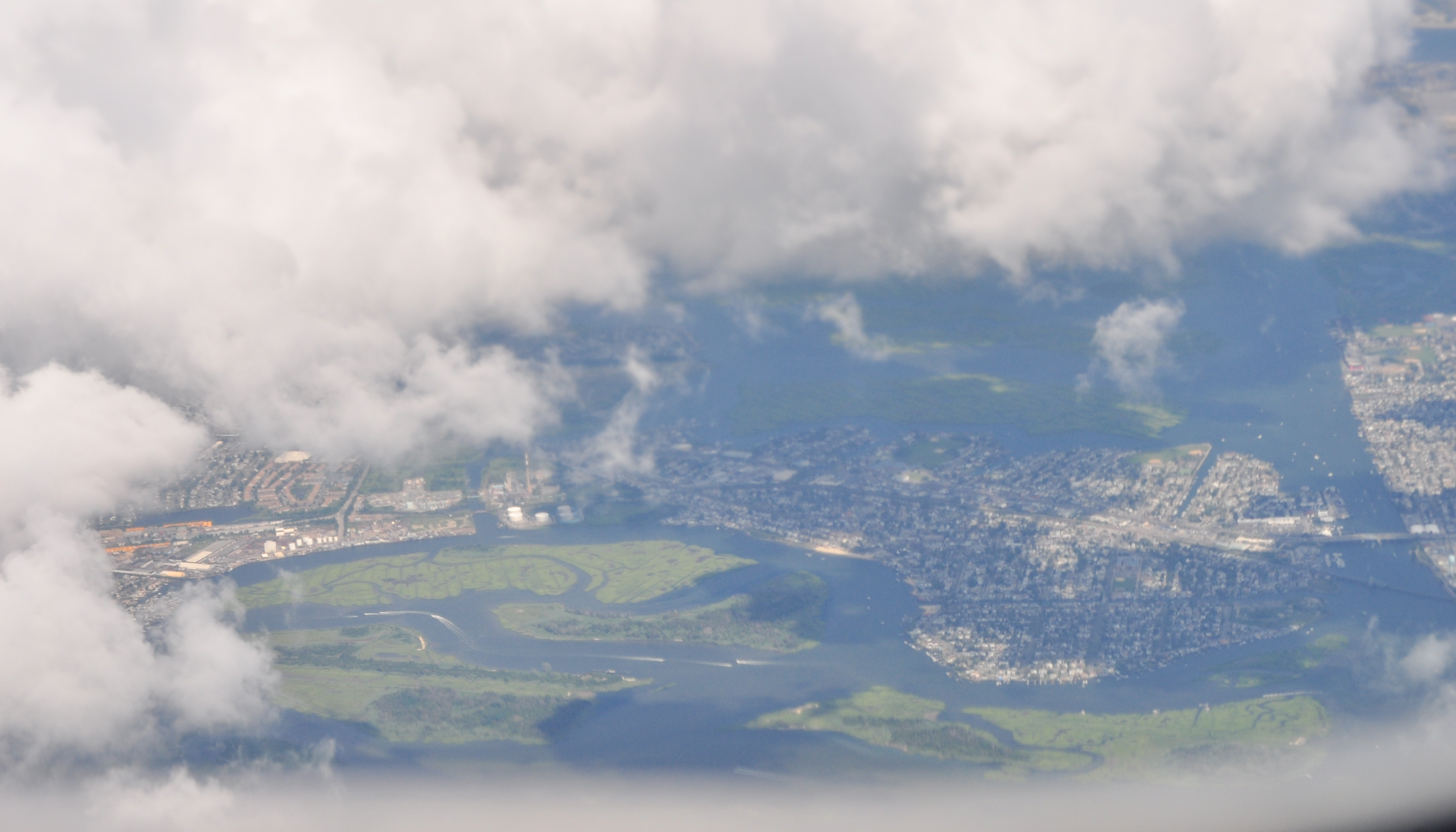
- Harbor Isle, as seen towards the bottom right from an airplane. Island Park and the hamlet of Barnum Island are also visible.

- Location in Nassau County and the state of New York.

- Location on Long Island Location within the state of New York
- Coordinates: 40°36′10″N 73°39′52″W
- Country: United States
- State: New York
- County: Nassau
- Town: Hempstead

Area
  - Total: 0.23 sq mi (0.59 km^{2})
  - Land: 0.17 sq mi (0.45 km^{2})
  - Water: 0.054 sq mi (0.14 km^{2})
- Elevation: 0 ft (0 m)

Population (2020)
  - Total: 1,436
  - Density: 8,234.0/sq mi (3,179.18/km^{2})
- Time zone: UTC-5 (Eastern (EST))
  - Summer (DST): UTC-4 (EDT)
- ZIP Code: 11558 (Island Park)
- Area codes: 516, 363
- FIPS code: 36-32105
- GNIS feature ID: 0952192

Harbor Isle is a hamlet and census-designated place (CDP) in the Town of Hempstead in Nassau County, New York, United States. The population was 1,436 at the time of the 2020 census.

== History ==
In the 1950s, a proposal was made for Harbor Isle to be annexed by the adjacent village, Island Park. The proposal ultimately was defeated, and Harbor Isle remains an unincorporated hamlet to this day.

== Geography ==
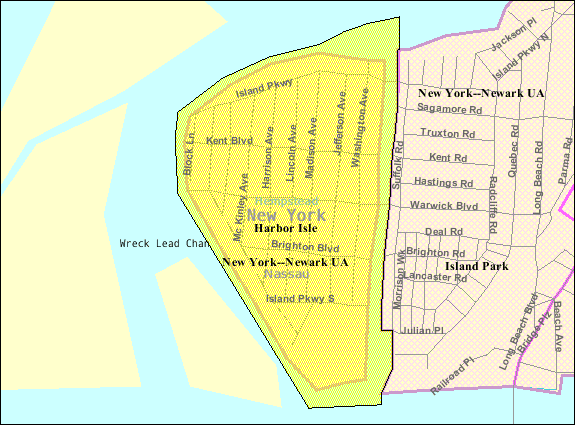
U.S. Census map of Harbor Isle.

According to the United States Census Bureau, the CDP has a total area of 0.2 square miles (0.52 km^{2}), of which 0.2 square miles (0.52 km^{2}) is land and 0.1 square miles (0.26 km^{2}) – or 21.74% – is water.

Harbor Isle is bordered by the Village of Island Park to the east, Hog Island Channel to the west and north, and Wreck Lead Channel to the south.

== Demographics ==
Historical population
Census	Pop.	Note	%±
2010	1,301		—
2020	1,436		10.4%
U.S. Decennial Census

As of the 2010 census, there were 1,301 people, 470 households, and 378 families residing in the CDP. The population density was 6,505 per square mile (2,512 per square kilometer). There were 495 housing units at an average density of 2,475 per square mile (956 per square kilometer). The racial makeup of the CDP was 94.8% White, 0.8% African American, 1.8% Asian, 1% from other races, and 1.7% from two or more races. Hispanic or Latino of any race were 5.9% of the population.

There were 470 households, out of which 33% had children under the age of 18 living with them, 67.9% were married couples living together, 16.4% had a female householder with no husband present, and 19.6% were non-families. 14.5% of all households were made up of individuals, and 7% had someone living alone who was 65 years of age or older. The average household size was 2.77 and the average family size was 3.05.

In the CDP, the population was spread out, with 20.5% under the age of 18, 5.1% from 20 to 24, 19.5% from 25 to 44, 31.5% from 45 to 64, and 18.8% who were 65 years of age or older. The median age was 47 years. For every 100 females, there were 96.5 males. For every 100 females age 18 and over, there were 94.7 males.

As of the 2000 census, the median income for a household in the CDP was $78,977, and the median income for a family was $82,021. Full-time, year-round male workers had a median income of $70,833 versus $44,792 for the same category of females. The per capita income for the CDP was $30,192. About 1.5% of families and 3.6% of the population were below the poverty line, including 4.1% of those under age 18 and 3.1% of those age 65 or over.

== Education ==
Harbor Isle, in its entirety, is located in the Island Park Union Free School District. High school students go to Long Beach High School of the Long Beach City School District.

From circa 1968 to 2008, the Island Park district sent high school students only to West Hempstead High School, operated by the West Hempstead Union Free School District. From circa 2008 to 2018, people living in the Island Park district could select between Long Beach and West Hempstead for high school education. In 2018 the Island Park school district stopped paying for Island Park residents to have the West Hempstead choice, and this was effective the 2019-2020 school year.
