= Island Park, New York =

- Village
- Incorporated Village of Island Park
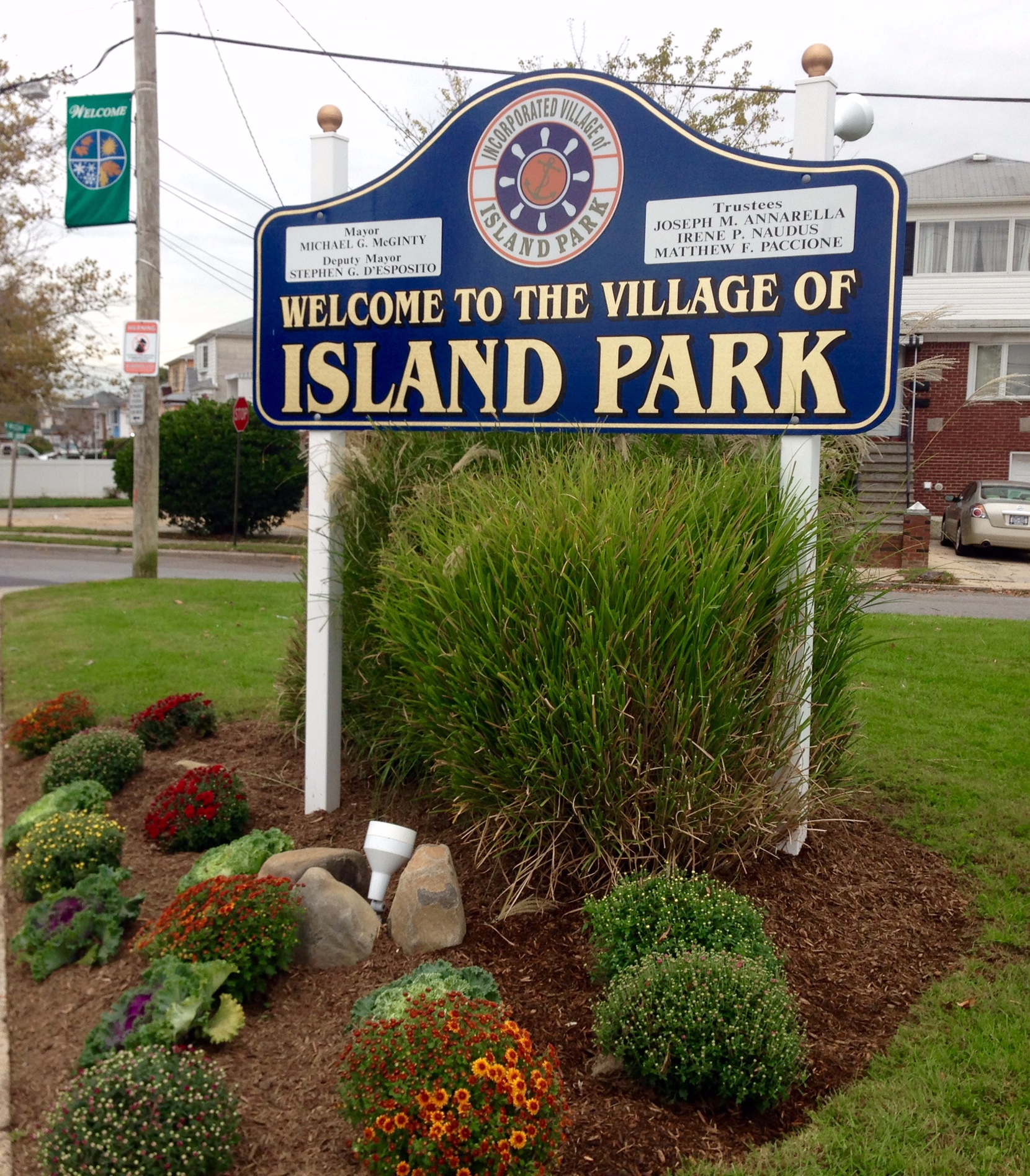
- A welcome sign at an entrance to the village

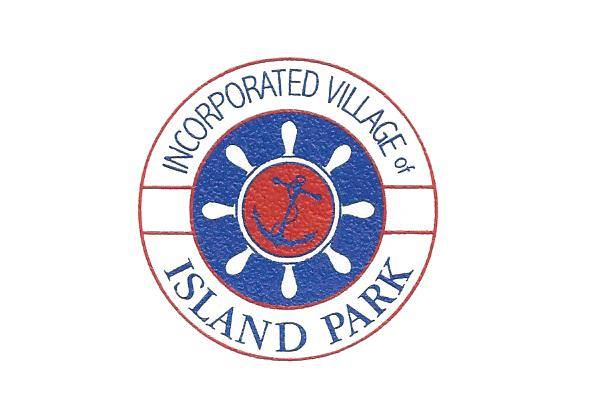
- Seal
- Motto: "Together we are better!"
- Location in Nassau County and the state of New York

- Location on Long Island Location within the state of New York
- Coordinates: 40°36′11″N 73°39′25″W
- Country: United States
- State: New York
- County: Nassau
- Town: Hempstead
- incorporated: 1926

Government
  - Mayor: Michael G. McGinty
  - Deputy Mayor: Matthew Graci
  - Trustees: Members' List: • Michael Gagliardi; • Matthew Graci; • Robert Tice; • Barbara A. Volpe-Ried

Area
  - Total: 0.44 sq mi (1.15 km^{2})
  - Land: 0.44 sq mi (1.15 km^{2})
  - Water: 0 sq mi (0.00 km^{2})
- Elevation: 0 ft (0 m)

Population (2020)
  - Total: 4,928
  - Density: 11,080.9/sq mi (4,278.35/km^{2})
- Time zone: UTC-5 (Eastern (EST))
  - Summer (DST): UTC-4 ((EDT))
- ZIP code: 11558
- Area codes: 516, 363
- FIPS code: 36-37847
- GNIS feature ID: 0953828
- Website: villageofislandpark.gov

Island Park is a village located within the Town of Hempstead in Nassau County, New York, United States. It is a neighbor to Long Beach to the south, and Oceanside to the north. The population was 4,928 at the time of the 2020 census.

== History ==
Island Park was developed by the Island Park-Long Beach Company as a resort community in the 1920s, after previous development plans for the area were cancelled due to the outbreak of World War I and the subsequent wartime efforts.

Island Park incorporated itself as a village in 1926. Its first mayor was Charles N. Talbot, who served in that capacity for 12 years.

In the 1950s, there was a proposal in which Island Park would have annexed the adjacent hamlet of Harbor Isle, located to its immediate west. The proposal was ultimately defeated, and to this day, Harbor Isle remains an unincorporated hamlet governed by the Town of Hempstead.

The Village of Island Park celebrated its centennial in 2026.

== Geography ==
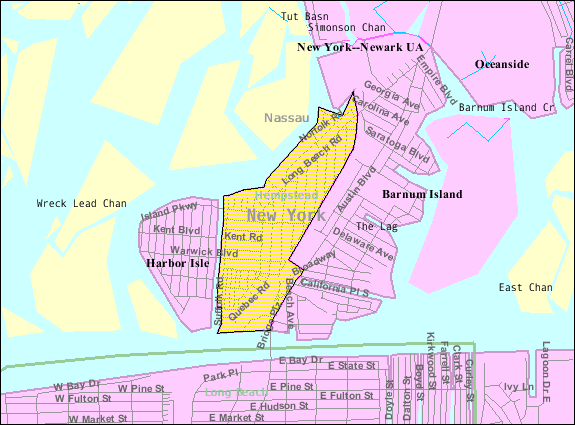
U.S. Census map of Island Park

According to the United States Census Bureau, the village has a total area of 1.5 square miles (3.9 km^{2}), all land.

The Village of Island Park is part of the Outer Barrier of Long Island and is bordered on the west by a man-made canal running parallel to Suffolk Road. Its northern borders follow another channel, while its eastern and southeastern borders are delineated by the rails of the Long Beach Branch of the Long Island Rail Road. Its southern border, meanwhile, is Reynolds Channel.

=== Climate ===
The Village of Island Park features a humid subtropical climate (Cfa) under the Köppen climate classification and is located near the transitional zone between humid subtropical and humid continental (Dfa) climates. Accordingly, the hamlet experiences hot, humid summers and cold winters, and experiences precipitation throughout the entirety of the year.

== Demographics ==
Historical population
Census	Pop.	Note	%±
1930	1,002		—
1940	1,531		52.8%
1950	2,031		32.7%
1960	4,014		97.6%
1970	5,891		46.8%
1980	4,201		−28.7%
1990	3,092		−26.4%
2000	4,732		53.0%
2010	4,655		−1.6%
2020	4,928		5.9%
U.S. Decennial Census

=== Racial and ethnic composition ===
Island Park village, New York – Racial and ethnic composition Note: the US Census treats Hispanic/Latino as an ethnic category. This table excludes Latinos from the racial categories and assigns them to a separate category. Hispanics/Latinos may be of any race.
Race / Ethnicity (NH = Non-Hispanic)	Pop 2000	Pop 2010	Pop 2020	% 2000	% 2010	% 2020
White alone (NH)	3,694	3,170	2,729	78.06%	68.10%	55.38%
Black or African American alone (NH)	31	64	149	0.66%	1.37%	3.02%
Native American or Alaska Native alone (NH)	2	3	9	0.04%	0.06%	0.18%
Asian alone (NH)	50	115	203	1.06%	2.47%	4.12%
Native Hawaiian or Pacific Islander alone (NH)	2	0	8	0.04%	0.00%	0.16%
Other race alone (NH)	15	21	60	0.32%	0.45%	1.22%
Mixed race or Multiracial (NH)	74	48	125	1.56%	1.03%	2.54%
Hispanic or Latino (any race)	864	1,234	1,645	18.26%	26.51%	33.38%
Total	4,732	4,655	4,928	100.00%	100.00%	100.00%

=== 2020 census ===
As of the 2020 census, Island Park had a population of 4,928. The median age was 41.6 years. 19.2% of residents were under the age of 18 and 15.8% of residents were 65 years of age or older. For every 100 females there were 96.7 males, and for every 100 females age 18 and over there were 94.3 males age 18 and over.

100.0% of residents lived in urban areas, while 0.0% lived in rural areas.

There were 1,725 households in Island Park, of which 34.3% had children under the age of 18 living in them. Of all households, 45.7% were married-couple households, 18.7% were households with a male householder and no spouse or partner present, and 28.4% were households with a female householder and no spouse or partner present. About 23.0% of all households were made up of individuals and 10.9% had someone living alone who was 65 years of age or older.

There were 1,851 housing units, of which 6.8% were vacant. The homeowner vacancy rate was 1.7% and the rental vacancy rate was 4.0%.

=== 2010 census ===
As of the census of 2010, there were 2,032 people, 1,603 households, and 1,872 families residing in the village. The population density was 8,865.7 inhabitants per square mile (3,423.1/km^{2}). There were 1,715 housing units. The median home value was $721,600. The racial makeup of the village was 94.6% White, 1.9% African American, 0.2% Native American, 0.5% Asian, 0.2% from other races. 1.8% were from two or more races. 2.5% of the population were Hispanic or Latino of any race. The primary ethnicities are Italian and Irish.

There were 1,685 households, out of which 33.0% had children under the age of 18 living with them, 51.3% were married couples living together, 13.9% had a female householder with no husband present, and 28.8% were non-families. 23.3% of all households were made up of individuals, and 9.6% had someone living alone who was 65 years of age or older. The average household size was 2.69 and the average family size was 3.17.

In the village, the population was spread out, with 22.1% aged 19 and under, 6.1% from 20 to 24, 33.6% from 25 to 44, 27.8% from 45 to 64, and 13.5% who were 65 years of age or older. The median age was 40.8 years. Female population was 51.1% and male population was 49.9%.

The median income for a household in the village was $162,500, and the median income for a family was $192,765. Males had a median income of $157,018 versus $177,764 for the female population per capita income. The per capita for the village was $28,149. 8.6% of the population and 0.1% of families were below the poverty line. 0.01% of those people were under the age of 18 and 11.1% were 65 and older.

== Government ==
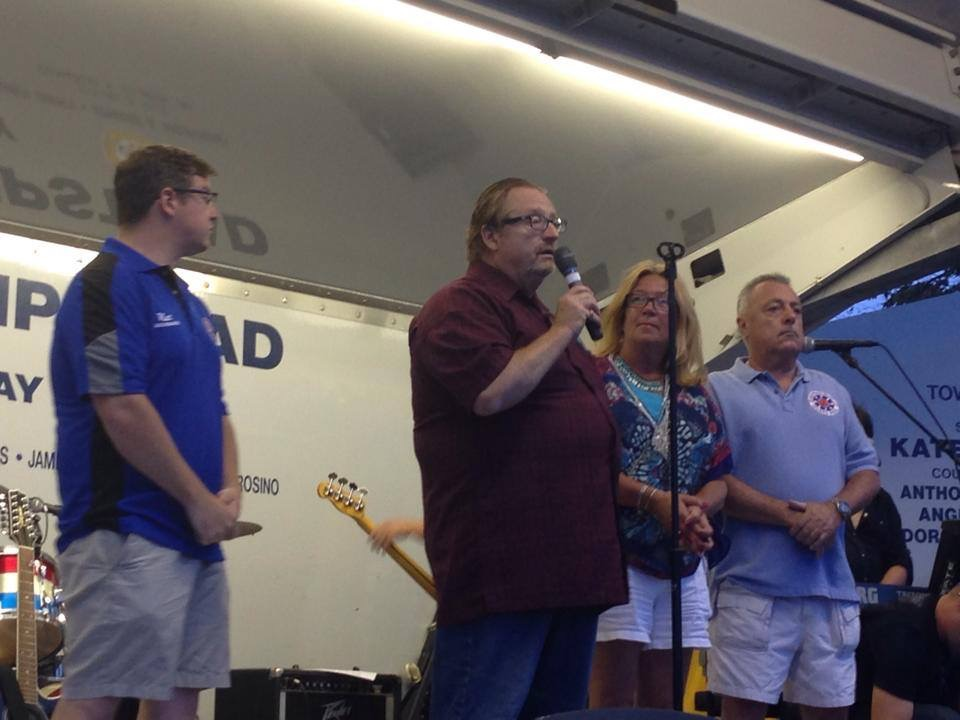
Mayor Michael McGinty addressing the crowd at a summer concert at Masone Beach. The Village Board is behind.

The community of Island Park is run by the Incorporated Village of Island Park which performs the majority of municipal services for residents, businesses and other community organizations. The Village is controlled by a 5 member village board which consists of the Mayor, Deputy Mayor, and three trustees, all of whom serve four year terms. The board votes on all resolutions in the village and are chiefly responsible for all municipal operations. The Village Clerk runs the day-to-day operations of the Village and acts as a supervisor for all Village staff.

As of June 2026, the Mayor of Island Park is Michael G. McGinty, the Deputy Mayor is Matthew Graci, and the Village Trustees are Michael Gagliardi, Matthew Graci, Robert Tice, and Barbara A. Volpe-Ried.

== Education ==
Island Park is located entirely within the boundaries of the Island Park Union Free School District, which provides education to all children in the Village of Island Park who attend public schools through grade 8. Students in grades K-4 attend the Francis X. Hegarty Elementary School, and those in grades 5-8 attend Lincoln Orens Middle School.

Children in grades 9–12 attend Long Beach High School, which is a part of the Long Beach City School District.

From c.1968 to 2008, the Island Park School District sent high school students only to West Hempstead High School, operated by the West Hempstead Union Free School District. From c.2008 to 2018, Island Park School District residents had the choice of attending either Long Beach High School or West Hempstead High School. In 2018 the Island Park School District stopped paying for Island Park residents to have the West Hempstead choice, effective at the start of the 2019-2020 school year.

== Transportation ==
=== Road ===
Major roads within Island Park include Island Parkway, Austin Boulevard, Long Beach Road, and Warwick Road – all of which are owned by Nassau County and maintained by both the Village and County through a shared services agreement.

=== Rail ===
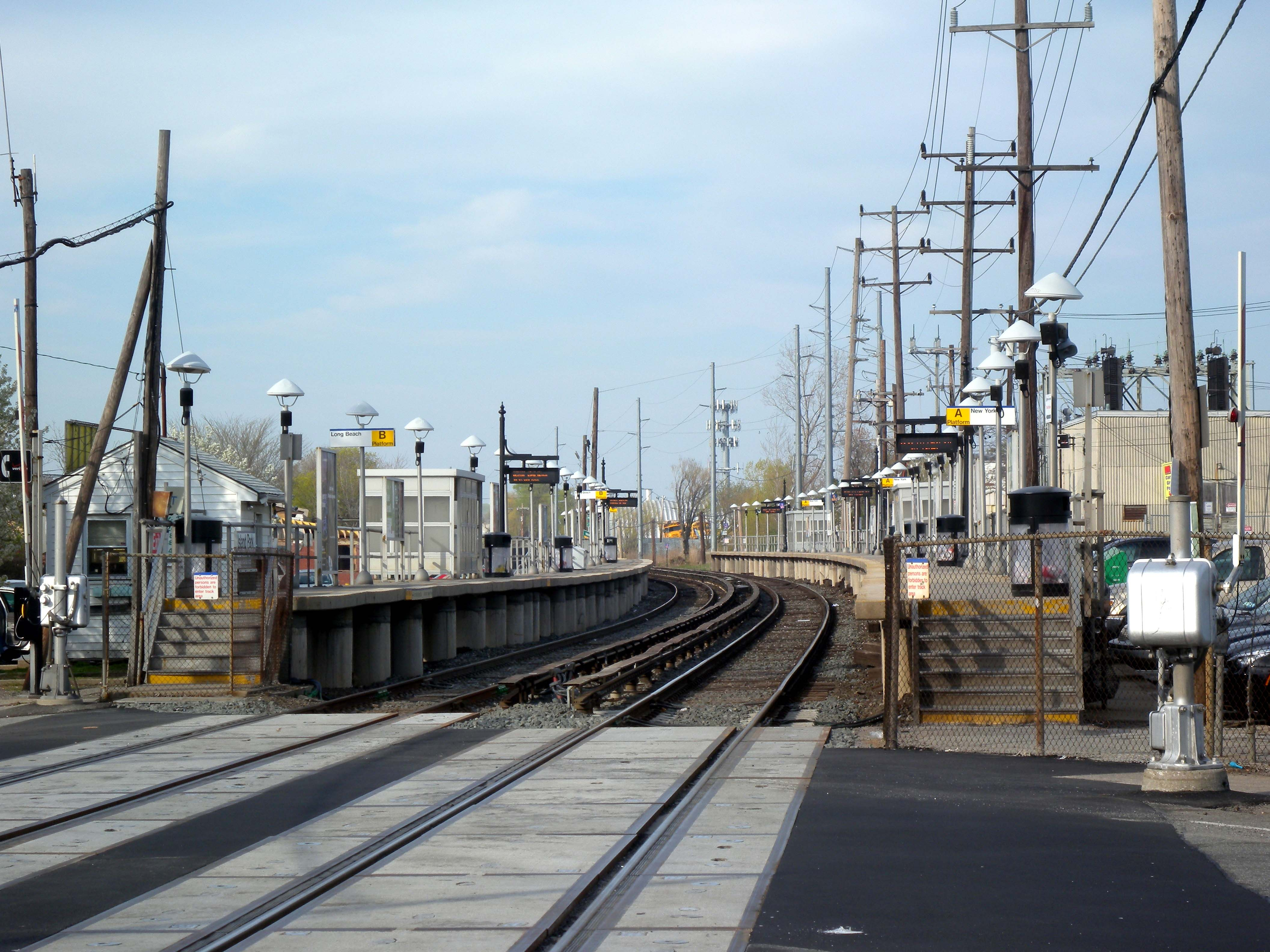
The Island Park LIRR station in 2009

The Island Park station on the Long Island Rail Road's Long Beach Branch provides commuters with a direct link to New York City.

== Notable people ==
- Anthony Bitetto (born 1990), professional hockey player for the New York Rangers.
- Al D'Amato (born 1937), United States Senator from New York from 1981 to 1999.
- Anthony D'Esposito (born 1982), Congressman, United States House of Representatives (2023–2024)
- Tim Dillon (born 1985), actor, comedian, and host of The Tim Dillon Show podcast.
- John F. Good (1936–2016), FBI agent who created the Abscam sting operation in the late 1970s and early 1980s.
- Raymond Kelly (born 1941), former New York City Police Commissioner.
- Vinny Palermo, former de facto head of the New Jersey DeCalvacante mafia family and basis for character Tony Soprano from the HBO series The Sopranos. Lived in Island Park with his family in the 1990s.

== See also ==
- List of municipalities in New York
- Islandia, New York
