= Kevin Cahill =

Kevin Cahill may refer to:

- Kevin Cahill (physician) (1936–2022) American physician
- Kevin Cahill (politician) (Born 1955) Member of the New York State Assembly
- Kevin Cahill (American football) (Born 1974) American football coach
