= Nassau County serial murders =

Unsolved series of murders

Details
- Victims: 5
- Span of crimes: 1984–1989
- Country: United States
- State: New York
- Date apprehended: N/A

The Nassau County serial murders were a series of murders of young women committed between 1984 and 1989 in Nassau County, New York. All the victims had been involved in prostitution or had drug addictions, and the perpetrator, a possible serial killer, was never apprehended.

These murders were the first possible instance of a serial killer operating in the Long Island area, as in the following decades, at least four unrelated serial killers were apprehended, collectively victimizing at least 32 girls and women.

== Murders ==
The official list of victims includes five women. There was no consistent manner in how they were murdered, as two had been bludgeoned to death, one victim was stabbed, another was strangled, and yet another was shot.

- Deborah Lee Smith, 20: originally from Quincy, California. Murdered in August 1984. Her corpse was found wrapped up in a blanket on August 21 near a curb on Hunters Avenue in Valley Stream. She had been shot twice in the head and chest area from close range, apparently with a large-caliber weapon.
- Jonie Jackson, 27: murdered in early 1985. Her corpse, showing signs of moderate decomposition, was found in a parking lot on Franklin Avenue in Hempstead on February 18, 1985. A forensic examination concluded that the cause of death was a head injury sustained in a beating. Jackson's body was covered in a plastic bag by the perpetrator after committing the murder.
- Gwendolyn "Gwen" Lukes, 26: found strangled in a cemetery in Upper Brookville on September 13, 1985. At the time of her death, Lukes was known to have prostituted herself in the Hempstead area for about three years.
- Genise Wilder, 22: originally from Roosevelt. Murdered in June 1989. Her body, bearing multiple stab wounds, was found on June 27 of that year in a factory area on Kellum Place in Hempstead.
- Christine Warner, 23: originally from Manhattan, also known by the name "Tina Clark." Found beaten to death on December 13, 1989, in a wooded area near the Meadowbrook Polo Club in Old Westbury.

== Suspect ==
During the investigation, one person was considered the prime suspect—a resident of Long Beach named Allen Gormely Jr. He was born on September 18, 1953, in Brooklyn, New York City, as the only son of Allen Gormely Sr. and Phyllis Capone, who had multiple daughters. Gormely Jr. spent his childhood and early life in Oceanside, where they moved after his parents divorced. After dropping out of West Hempstead High School upon completing the 10th grade, he trained to be a carpenter but was unable to find work in this field; instead, he started working in various strip clubs, nightclubs, sex stores, and pornographic film sales stores in New York City's various suburbs. At some point, he also worked as a trucker for a company based in Brooklyn. Gormely was unmarried and spent most of his time in red-light districts, but had no criminal record and had never been criminally charged until 1990.

On November 8, 1990, Gormely was arrested for the murders of two prostitutes committed in Queens. The victims were named as 19-year-old Stephanie Krut and 25-year-old Mayra Eusebio, who had been murdered on February 10 and October 30, 1990, respectively. After his arrest, Gormely confessed to killing both, telling investigators that he strangled the women inside his apartment in Long Beach on 511 West Walnut Street after they supposedly demanded that he give them money to buy crack cocaine, which he refused. Upon saying so, he alleged that both women threatened to tell their pimps to harm him.

Gormely became a suspect since he had placed both of his victims' bodies in plastic garbage bags and dumped them on the outskirts of town, similar to how the murders of Lukes and Wilder had been carried out. He was investigated for these crimes as well, but was never charged due to a lack of evidence. In 1992, he was tried for both of his confirmed murders, with his defense being that he had accidentally killed both women during "rough sex." However, this did not convince the jury, and Gormely was convicted of the murders of Krut and Eusebio, subsequently being given a 50-year sentence.

Gormely died in the Wende Correctional Facility on September 28, 2014. He was never charged with any other murders, and all the cases associated with the Nassau County serial murders remain cold cases.

== See also ==
- Gilgo Beach serial killings
- List of serial killers in the United States
