= Skudin =

Skudin (Russian: Скудин) is a Russian masculine surname originating from the word skuda meaning 'poverty, need, lack'; its feminine counterpart is Skudina. It may refer to:

- Will Skudin, American surfer
- Yekaterina Skudina (born 1981), Russian Olympic sailor
