= Jim Fiore =

American sports administrator (born 1968)

- Born: James D. Fiore Jr. August 13, 1968 (age 58); Long Beach, New York, U.S.
- Education: Hofstra University (BA); Springfield College (M.Ed)
- Occupation: Administrator

James D. Fiore Jr. (born August 13, 1968) is an American sports administrator who served as the Director of Athletics at Stony Brook University from 2003 to 2013. Fiore was named Stony Brook's athletic director in 2003 and was fired in 2013 after numerous accusations of sexual harassment, misappropriation of university resources, and employment discrimination.

The sexual misconduct allegations led to Fiore being removed from consideration for athletic director positions at Rutgers University, Princeton University and the University of Massachusetts. He has not worked in college athletics since.

== Early life and education ==
Fiore was born on August 13, 1968, in Long Beach, New York, on Long Island. He graduated from Long Beach High School in Lido Beach, New York.

He went on to earn his Bachelor of Arts degree from Hofstra University in Hempstead, New York, where he played free safety for Hofstra's football team from 1988 to 1990. He continued his education at Springfield College in Springfield, Massachusetts, where he earned a Master of Education degree in athletic administration in 1994. While at Springfield, Fiore participated in an athletic administration fellowship from 1992 to 1994, and interned with the college's Director of Athletics.

In 1993, Fiore served as an executive assistant at the National Invitation Tournament (NIT), and later that year was a compliance intern at Fordham University.

== Career ==
=== Dartmouth College and Princeton University ===
In 1995, Fiore was named assistant athletic director at Dartmouth College in Hanover, New Hampshire, and served in that role until 1999. From 1999 to 2003, he held the position Senior Associate Director of Athletics at Princeton University.

=== Stony Brook University ===
On July 23, 2003, Fiore was named director of athletics at Stony Brook University at the age of 34. He succeeded Richard Laskowski, who served as Stony Brook's athletic director and dean of physical education since 1993 and presided over the school's transition from NCAA Division III to Division I before stepping down in 2003.

The Stony Brook athletic program blossomed under Fiore. At the time of his arrival, Stony Brook had less than 300 annual donors, and the largest single donation was $100,000. By 2012, Stony Brook had 1,300 annual donors and secured a $4.3 million donation by billionaire alumnus Glenn Dubin for a 8,000-square foot weight facility. Fiore led efforts to found the Spirit of Stony Brook Marching Band, offer the FCS maximum number of scholarships for football, hiring academic sports staff, extending campus dining hall hours and aggressively fundraising the university's alumni base. Stony Brook won 22 conference championships with Fiore at the helm from 2003 to 2012.

Minnesota Twins pitcher Joe Nathan, a Stony Brook alumnus, donated $500,000 for the Seawolves' new baseball field, Joe Nathan Field, which opened in 2011. A $21.1 million renovation of the Stony Brook University Arena was also secured.

Fiore referred to his "AD" job as short for "advanced dreamer". He declared that Stony Brook's academics were on par with Big Ten Conference schools and in 2010, believed that Stony Brook would be on pace to become a Big Ten member in 25–30 years with FBS football and committed state support.

Stony Brook played its first FBS/Division I-A opponent, South Florida, in 2010. Under Fiore, Stony Brook's baseball team reached the College World Series in 2012, becoming the first Northeast school to do so since 1986.

==== Sexual misconduct allegations and termination ====
On November 19, 2013, Fiore was fired and the remaining 31 months of his Stony Brook athletic director contract were bought out for nearly $800,000. Stony Brook's senior associate athletic director Donna Woodruff was named interim athletic director. Initially, no reason was given by the university and athletic department for Fiore's departure.

A week later, ESPN's Kate Fagan reported that numerous accusations of inappropriate behavior had been brought against Fiore over the last two years. Woodruff and senior associate AD Matt Larsen, now the athletic director at North Dakota State, both asked Fiore to resign, but he refused. Stony Brook's Office of Diversity and Affirmative Action did not act on the claims until his firing. Among the claims included allegations of sexual harassment, misappropriation of university resources and discrimination against employees based on gender, age and sexual orientation.

Female coaches and student-athletes at Stony Brook alleged that Fiore would directly ask them about their sexual orientation and send them inappropriate text messages from his university cell phone. Fiore was also accused of touching female student-athletes in inappropriate ways by massaging their shoulders and rubbing the inner thigh of an athlete who was rehabilitating a leg injury, and threatening female athletes with the removal of their scholarships.

Fiore was also accused of misappropriating university resources by allowing his son's CYO basketball team to hold practices on campus for free even though university policies require outside organizations to pay a fee.

The anonymous, ‘kitchen sink’ allegations that have been made against me are absolutely false. I cannot help but think that the motives of the unnamed ‘sources’ serve no purpose other than someone’s obvious financial gain and to hurt me personally and professionally. I will vigorously fight these bogus claims and defend my reputation.

— Jim Fiore

Through his spokesperson Michael Conte, Fiore denied all allegations of misconduct. "The letter Jim received informing him of the termination of his contract specified no disciplinary action. It would be counterintuitive to conclude the university would buy out his contract to the sum of nearly $800,000 if Jim was facing disciplinary charges," Conte said. However, official documents claimed that Stony Brook did not interview key female coaches, staff and administrators during its internal investigation into Fiore's alleged misconduct.

Once considered a "rising star" in college athletics for his role in elevating the Stony Brook program, the sexual misconduct allegations halted Fiore's career. He was one of 10 final candidates interviewed for the Rutgers University athletic director job after Tim Pernetti resigned for his role in the Mike Rice scandal, where basketball coach Rice was caught on video kicking players, throwing basketballs at them and using homophobic slurs in practice. However, Fiore was removed from consideration in May 2013 after an outside source alerted Rutgers of his misconduct at Stony Brook. Fiore expressed interest in the open athletic director at Princeton University, his former employer, but Princeton officials were made aware of Fiore's misconduct after he publicly expressed interest in the position.

In 2015, Fiore was named as a candidate for the University of Massachusetts athletic director job. UMass student government and two UMass athletes wrote a letter to the search committee demanding that Fiore be removed from consideration due to his history of sexual harassment and discrimination against LGBT athletes. "The search committee's consideration of Fiore as a candidate for Athletic Director directly contradicts the University of Massachusetts' efforts to cultivate an LGBTQ-friendly environment for all students, including an increasing number of student athletes," the letter said. Ultimately, Fiore was passed over for Ryan Bamford.

=== Dynamic Sports Management ===
In 2014, Fiore was hired as president and CEO of Dynamic Sports Management, a sports management firm based in Melville, New York, on Long Island. He left the firm in 2016.

== See also ==
- Stony Brook University
- Stony Brook Seawolves
