= Will Skudin =

Personal information
- Years active: 2003–present
- Height: 6 ft 0 in (183 cm)
- Weight: 170 lb (77 kg)
- Website: skudinsurf.com

Surfing career
- Sport: Surfing
- Best year: 2013

Surfing specifications
- Stance: Goofy

Will Skudin is a native of Long Beach, NY and a professional surfer. Skudin is a third-generation surfer and along with his brother, Cliff, is the co-founder of Skudin Surf and Surf for All, a nonprofit organization.

== Education ==
Skudin graduated from Long Beach High School in 2003. Skudin is a long-time friend to Balaram Stack, another professional surfer from Long Beach.

== Professional career ==
Skudin is currently ranked number 24 in Big Wave Surfing and is on tour with the 2017 Big Wave Tour in the World Surf League. In 2015, Skudin caught one of the biggest waves ever recorded at Nazare. In 2013, he was named Eastern Surf Magazine's Surfer of the Year. He also qualified for Billabong's XXL Ride of the Year.
