= John F. Good =

American FBI agent (1936–2016)

John Francis Good (June 17, 1936 – September 28, 2016) was an American agent of the Federal Bureau of Investigation (FBI) who created the Abscam sting operation in the late 1970s and early 1980s. Abscam led to the arrest and conviction of several elected officials at the local, state, and federal level, including Mayor of Camden, New Jersey Angelo Errichetti and U.S. Senator Harrison A. Williams, using a fictional Arab sheikh seeking political favors as bait. The Abscam story was portrayed in the 2013 film American Hustle; in the movie, Bradley Cooper portrayed a composite character that was based on Good and two other FBI agents who worked on the case during the two-year-long operation.

== Personal life ==
Good was born in the Pelham Bay section of The Bronx, New York City, on June 17, 1936. His father was an FBI agent who had been part of the investigation of Julius and Ethel Rosenberg. After graduating from Cardinal Hayes High School, Good earned a degree in sociology from Fordham University in 1958.

After leaving the FBI in 1986, Good became a private investigator, ultimately creating his own firm. A resident of Island Park, New York, Good died at his home there on September 28, 2016.

== Public service ==
After serving in the United States Navy, Good followed his father to the FBI and was assigned to field offices in Illinois and Texas, before being transferred to New York City and ultimately being assigned to head a new FBI office in Hauppauge, on Long Island. Good had been frustrated at the relatively low level of criminal activities he was pursuing in the quiet suburban FBI office, such as fraud and truck hijackings, and sought to find opportunities to identify bigger cases. After reading a memo about a low-level con artist named Mel Weinberg, Good envisioned using Weinberg as a means to reel in bigger fish in exchange for a lighter sentence for Weinberg. Good's early plan included using Weinberg as an intermediary to buy stolen art, with an FBI agent of Arab ancestry used to portray an Arab sheikh as the putative buyer of the high-value artworks. Abdul Enterprises, a company supposedly owned by the fictional sheikh, became the basis of the Abscam sting operation, whose original goals were to identify white-collar criminals on Long Island, but which rapidly expanded in scope and area.

A criminal who had been targeted early in the investigation made the offer to have the sheikhs invest in casino gambling operations in Atlantic City, New Jersey. A string of politicians were approached with appeals to help the sheikhs obtain casino licenses and to obtain immigration status for their employees. The meetings arranged between the FBI agents and politicians were carefully staged in a house in Washington, D.C., that was thoroughly outfitted with recording equipment, with which Good "watched all of the payoffs go down, every single one of them". Using the videotaped recordings of cash bribes accepted by dozens of often-eager recipients, Good was able to obtain indictments and convictions of U.S. Senator Harrison A. Williams of New Jersey, six members of the U.S. House of Representatives – John Jenrette of South Carolina, Richard Kelly of Florida, Raymond Lederer and Michael "Ozzie" Myers, both of Pennsylvania, Frank Thompson of New Jersey, and John M. Murphy of New York – who were all convicted of bribery and conspiracy in separate trials in 1981. Five other local, state and federal government officials were also convicted.

Good rejected criticism that came from U.S. Senator Alan K. Simpson at a legislative hearing claiming that the FBI had been too aggressive in pursuing the investigation after several politicians had already been caught, noting that it would have only raised questions if the staff of the sting had rejected the chance to meet with other elected officials who had been introduced to them.

The Abscam story was portrayed in the film American Hustle, with Bradley Cooper playing a role that was a composite of Good and other FBI agents. Good felt that the film accurately represented the scenes in which the phony sheikhs met with politicians, but that the film romanticized many aspects of the sting operation and manufactured many plot elements, noting that if it had played out in theaters as it did in real life "it would be a very boring movie". Good and fellow FBI investigator Tony Amoroso served as consultants on the film.
