= Long Beach City School District =

School District in Long Beach, New York

Long Beach City School District Long Beach Public Schools

Location
- Long Beach, New York; United States
- Coordinates: 40°35′17.5″N 73°37′44″W

District information
- Type: Public school district
- Established: 1911; 115 years ago
- President: Sam Pinto
- Vice-president: Alexis Pace
- Superintendent: Dr. Jennifer Gallagher

Students and staff
- Enrollment: 3,583
- Faculty: 351 (on FTE basis)
- Student–teacher ratio: 10.94

Other information
- Website: www.lbeach.org

The Long Beach City School District is a public school district that provides education to The City of Long Beach, Lido Beach, Point Lookout and a part of East Atlantic Beach. The district also takes high school students from the Island Park Union Free School District, which covers Barnum Island, Harbor Isle, and Island Park. Those communities are on the South Shore of Long Island, New York. It currently houses a total of 3,583 students in all grades.

The school board is composed of five elected members. Currently, the board members are: Dennis Ryan, Ph.D. (President), Maureen Vrona, Esq. (Vice President), Anne Conway, Sam Pinto, and Tina Posterli.

Although it identifies publicly as Long Beach Public Schools, it is actually not a 'public school district'—a legal term in New York—but an 'extended city school district', meaning it has a great deal more autonomy and flexibility than a regular school district.

== Schools and locations ==
=== Pre-elementary ===
The Long Beach City School District has one pre-elementary level program, which is at Lido School.

=== Elementary ===
There are four elementary schools located within the Long Beach City School District: East School, located on Neptune Blvd.; West School, located on Maryland Ave.; Lindell School, located on Lindell Blvd.; and Lido School, located on Lido Blvd. Only Lido Elementary School is located outside of the City of Long Beach. All four of these schools house grades K-5, totaling 1,789 students.

=== Intermediate ===
The Long Beach City School District has one intermediate level school located in the district. It is located in the same complex as the Lido Elementary School on Lido Blvd. Housed in this school are grades 6–8, totaling 970 students.

=== High school ===
Long Beach High School is also located in Lido Beach, on Lagoon Drive West. The high school is also located directly on Reynolds Channel, which borders the barrier island of Long Beach to the north. Long Beach High School houses grades 9–12. The student population of Long Beach High School is 1,021 students. Island Park students can attend Long Beach High School, since Island Park schools maintain no high school.

In addition to the traditional high school is the alternative school at NIKE. This is located near the transportation garages on Lido Blvd. NIKE also houses alternative classrooms for grades 9–12.

=== Private schools ===
Also located within the confines of the Long Beach City School District is the Long Beach Catholic Regional School, a parochial school housing grades K-8. This school is privately funded, though transportation is provided by the Long Beach City School District for Long Beach residents as per state law.

== Administration ==
The central Administration Building is located on Lido Blvd. near both the Lido Elementary School and Long Beach Middle School.
