= Paul Boesch =

American professional wrestler, announcer, promoter (1912–1989)

- Born: Paul Max Boesch; October 2, 1912; New York City, New York U.S.
- Died: March 7, 1989 (aged 76); Sugar Land, Texas, U.S.
- Professional wrestling career
- Debut: October 25, 1932 (as wrestler); 1947 (as announcer); 1966 (as promoter)
- Retired: 1987
- Military career
- Allegiance: United States
- Branch: United States Army
- Service years: 1942–1945
- Conflicts: World War II; Battle of Hürtgen Forest
- Awards: Combat Infantry Badge; Silver Star and cluster Bronze Star Medal and cluster Purple Heart Medal; Distinguished Unit Citation; Croix de guerre with star (France)
- Other work: Professional wrestler, professional wrestling announcer and promoter

Paul Max Boesch (October 2, 1912 – March 7, 1989) was an American professional wrestler and promoter, most famous for his work as an announcer and promoter for Houston Wrestling. He also spent several stints working with the Universal Wrestling Federation, World Class Championship Wrestling, Jim Crockett Promotions, and the World Wrestling Federation.

Boesch was posthumously inducted into the WWE Hall of Fame in 2021, as a part of the Legacy wing.

== Early life and education ==
Boesch was born in Brooklyn, New York, on October 2, 1912. His family eventually moved from Brooklyn to nearby Long Beach, where Boesch graduated from Long Beach High School in 1929. A gifted athlete, he became a lifeguard at the Long Island beaches near his home, and he was skilled enough as a swimmer to place third in the North Atlantic Coast Lifeguard Competition in 1932. He was also credited with saving 130 or more lives from the water around New York. Boesch began wrestling professionally during the 1930s, his first notable match being a 90-minute bout against Pat Meehan in Calgary on November 25, 1938, which ended in a draw.

== Military service ==
With the outbreak of World War II, Boesch suspended his wrestling career to enlist in the United States Army. He graduated from officer candidate school in 1942 and earned a commission in the 121st Infantry Regiment of the 8th Infantry Division. Boesch deployed to Europe with his unit after the D-Day landings to take part in the offensive against Nazi Germany. As commanding officer of Company G, 1st Lt. Boesch led his rifle company in one of the bloodiest and most desperate battles of the war on the Western Front, the Battle of Hürtgen Forest. His unit took heavy casualties during the fighting, and Boesch himself was seriously injured by a German artillery shell, and for his service, Boesch was awarded numerous decorations, including the Purple Heart, the Silver Star with oak leaf clusters, the Bronze Star with oak leaf clusters, and the French Croix de Guerre with star. He also earned the prized Combat Infantryman Badge and the Distinguished Unit Citation, awarded to the soldiers of the 121st Infantry for their meritorious efforts in the Hürtgen Forest. After the war, he was honored with a Distinguished Citizens Award from the 121st Infantry Association for his outstanding community service with charitable groups including the Boys Club of America. Boesch authored a well-regarded memoir of his experiences in World War II entitled, Road to Huertgen: Forest in Hell.

== Houston Wrestling ==
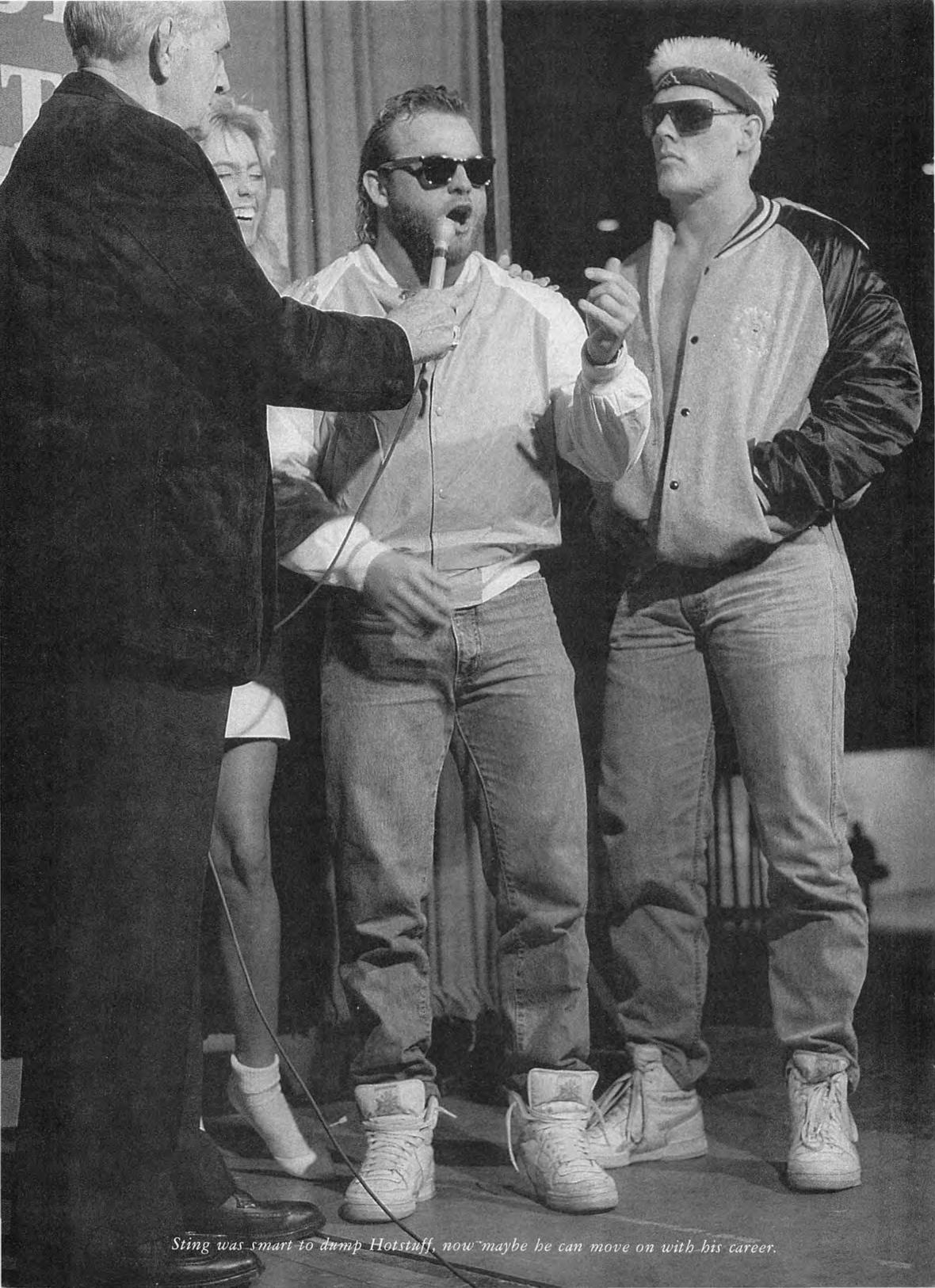
Paul Boesch with Missy Hyatt, Eddie Gilbert and Sting during an interview for Houston Wrestling.

Boesch returned to wrestling after World War II, competing in matches across North America. In October 1947, Boesch suffered a broken leg in a car collision with a trailer truck en route from San Antonio, Texas to Corpus Christi, effectively forcing him to retire from in-ring competition. It was at this time that Houston Wrestling promoter Morris Sigel approached him to work for his growing Texas organization. Boesch became an advisor to Sigel as well as a radio announcer, and two years later became the promotion's first television commentator when the show debuted on local television. Boesch's wrestling broadcasts remained a fixture on Houston television for over 30 years, airing on station KHTV channel 39 (now KIAH, a CW Network affiliate).

After Sigel died in 1966 after a long illness, Boesch bought out Houston Wrestling from Sigel's widow. Boesch had essentially been training for this opportunity for 20 years, and he quickly brought the organization to new levels of success and visibility. Under Boesch's leadership, Houston Wrestling quickly attained gained a reputation as one of the top regional wrestling promotions of its time. Promoters such as Gary Hart (World Class Championship Wrestling) and wrestlers such as Barry Darsow would repeatedly praise Boesch's acumen and honesty as a promoter and businessman. Boesch is also credited with the invention of mud wrestling, a concept he devised for a major match between Gus Sonnenberg and Harnam Singh in Seattle, Washington.

Together with his nephew Peter Birkholz, Boesch entered Houston Wrestling into affiliations with Mid South Wrestling, World Wrestling Federation, Universal Wrestling Federation, and World Class Championship Wrestling to ensure that top talent from all over the country would appear on his weekly Friday Night shows; he would offer his fans dream matches and one card would see Jack Brisco capture the NWA World Heavyweight Championship from Harley Race on July 20, 1973. As professional wrestling became a major entertainment business in the 1980s, most of Boesch's affiliates joined the National Wrestling Alliance. Boesch eventually shut down Houston Wrestling in favor of signing with Vince McMahon and the World Wrestling Federation, an affiliation that lasted only four months.

After 55 years in the industry as a wrestler, announcer and promoter, Paul Boesch retired on August 28, 1987, due to health concerns. The now-WWE hosted the Paul Boesch Retirement Show in Houston in his honor, which drew a sell-out crowd of 12,000 to the Sam Houston Coliseum. During the show, personal friend and then-Vice President George Bush had a telegram delivered praising Boesch for his lifelong commitment to service. Approximately a year later, he made a brief return and helped Jim Crockett promoting in Houston, and served as a figurehead NWA Board member, soon retiring.

== Death ==
Boesch died on March 7, 1989, after suffering a heart attack in Sugar Land, Texas. He was inducted into the Wrestling Observer Newsletter Hall of Fame as a charter member in 1996. He was inducted into the Professional Wrestling Hall of Fame in 2005 as a non-wrestler participant in the business. He was inducted into the WWE Hall of Fame in 2021 as a part of the Legacy wing.

== Legacy ==
Paul Boesch's contribution to the wrestling industry has been praised by numerous observers as well as by former wrestlers themselves. WWE commentator Jim Ross has publicly stated that he believes Boesch is worthy of enshrinement in the WWE Hall of Fame. The Professional Wrestling Hall of Fame states that "his influence in professional wrestling cannot be overestimated" due to his expansive promotion of the sport throughout Texas. Through his efforts, Boesch turned Houston into one of the top promotions on the regional wrestling circuit, and in addition to his professional accomplishments, Boesch was active in numerous philanthropic endeavors throughout his life. He was a highly visible fixture in the community during his many years in Houston, serving in charitable organizations like the Boys Club and promoting the benefits and necessity of physical fitness for America's youth.

Boesch's wife Valerie died on March 23, 2020.

== Bibliography ==
During his life, Boesch wrote four books:

- Road to Huertgen: Forest in Hell (1962), his story as a soldier in World War II.
- Much of Me in Each of These (1966), a book of poetry composed by Boesch himself.
- The Career of Paul Boesch-- One Man, One Sport, One Lifetime-- 50 years on the mat (1981), an autobiography.
- Hey Boy- Where'd You Get Them Ears? (2001), a secondary autobiography including his later memoirs; he wrote it in 1988 and was published by his widow Valerie Boesch.

Boesch was equally responsible for Whatever Happened to Gorgeous George? (1974), as the author Joe Jares quotes Boesch throughout and credits him for being open and accommodating during his research.

== Awards and accomplishments ==
- National Wrestling Alliance
  - NWA Hall of Fame (Class of 2012)
- Pro Wrestling Illustrated
  - Editors' Award (1987)
- Professional Wrestling Hall of Fame and Museum
  - Class of 2005
- Wrestling Observer Newsletter
  - Wrestling Observer Newsletter Hall of Fame (Class of 1996)
- WWE
  - WWE Hall of Fame (Class of 2021)

=== Military decorations ===

Badge	Combat Infantry Badge		
1st Row	Silver Star and cluster		
2nd Row	Bronze Star Medal and cluster	Purple Heart Medal	Croix de guerre with star (France)

1st Row	Distinguished Unit Citation
