= Point Lookout, New York =

- Hamlet and census-designated place
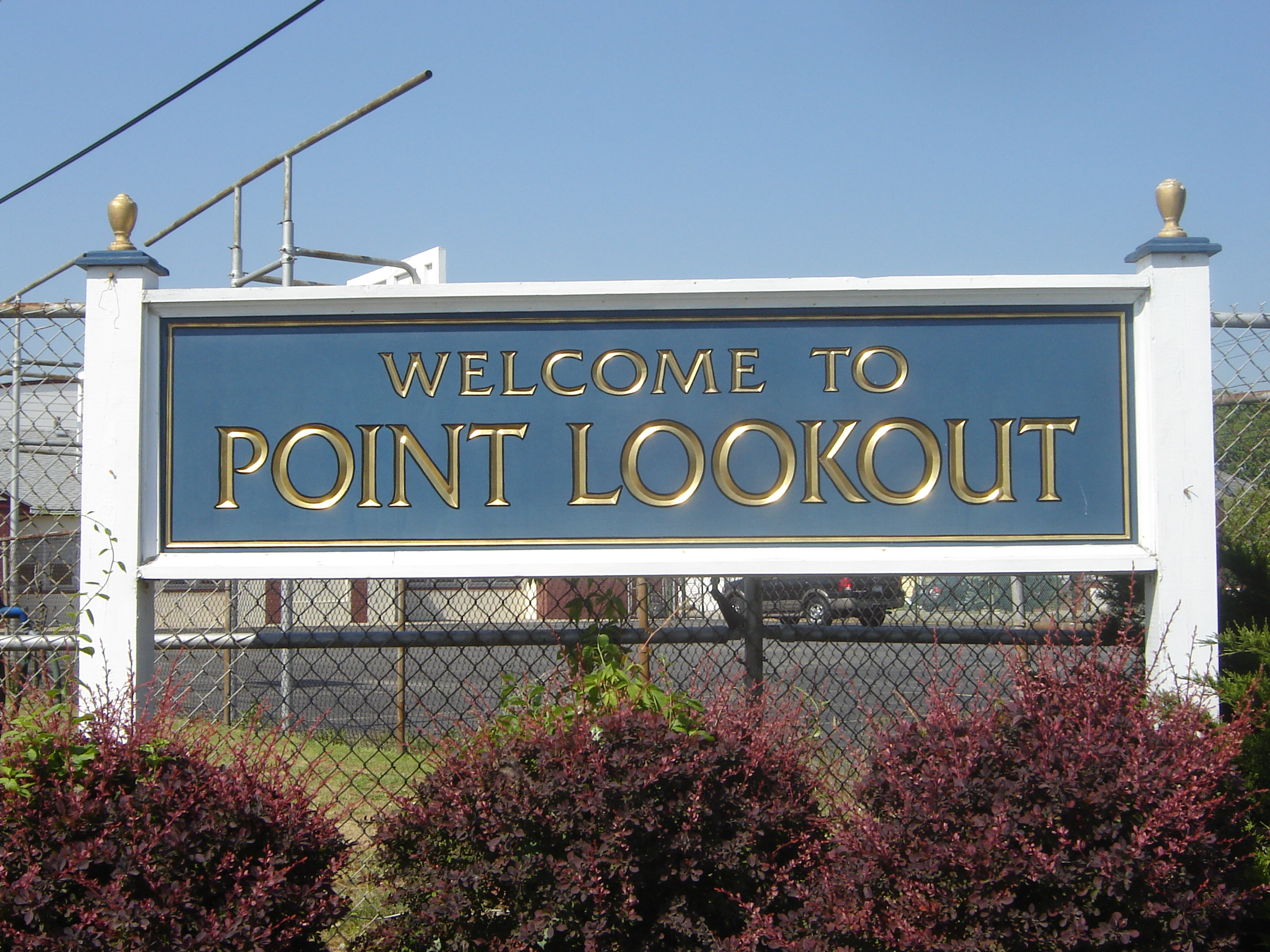

- Flag

- Location in Nassau County and the state of New York.

- Location on Long Island Location within the state of New York
- Coordinates: 40°35′27″N 73°34′48″W
- Country: United States
- State: New York
- County: Nassau
- Town: Hempstead

Area
  - Total: 0.37 sq mi (0.97 km^{2})
  - Land: 0.27 sq mi (0.70 km^{2})
  - Water: 0.10 sq mi (0.27 km^{2})
- Elevation: 3.3 ft (1 m)

Population (2020)
  - Total: 1,527
  - Density: 5,633.6/sq mi (2,175.16/km^{2})
- Time zone: UTC−5 (Eastern (EST))
  - Summer (DST): UTC−4 (EDT)
- ZIP Code: 11569
- Area codes: 516, 363
- FIPS code: 36-58849
- GNIS feature ID: 0960827

Point Lookout is a hamlet and census-designated place (CDP) located in the town of Hempstead in Nassau County, New York, United States. The population was 1,527 at the time of the 2020 census. The town is mostly made up of residential homes, with several small businesses on Lido Boulevard. The town is surrounded on three sides by water. Today, Point Lookout has become a popular location for summer residences. Among its inhabitants, it is commonly referred to as "PLO".

== Geography ==
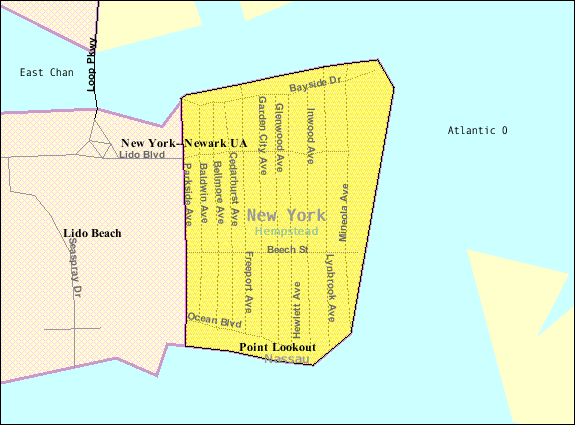
U.S. Census map of Point Lookout.

Point Lookout is located at the east end of Long Beach Barrier Island. It is adjacent to Lido Beach, which in turn abuts the city of Long Beach, to the west. Point Lookout covers a total area of 0.27 square miles (0.70 km^{2}), all land.

Long Beach Barrier Island, which lies between Reynolds Channel and the Atlantic Ocean, was originally formed by glacial deposits and includes a variety of bays, dunes, ponds, marshes, and ocean shoreline, which supports a complex ecosystem that includes a wide variety of flora and fauna. Jones Inlet separates it from Jones Beach Island.

== Demographics ==
Historical population
Census	Pop.	Note	%±
2020	1,527		—
U.S. Decennial Census

At the time of the 2020 census and the 2022 American Community Survey 5-Year Estimates, the total population was 1,527 people and 556 estimated households. The population density was 5,655.6 inhabitants per square mile (2,183.6/km^{2}). There were 855 housing units at an average density of 3,166.7 per square mile (1,222.7/km^{2}). The racial makeup of the CDP was 93.06% White, 0.52% African American, 1.18% Asian, 0.79% from other races, and 4.45% from two or more races. Hispanic or Latino of any race were 4.06% of the population.

Out of 556 households, 11.2% had children under the age of 18 living with them, 38.5% were married couples living together, 35.6% had a female householder with no spouse present, and 20.9% had a male householder with no spouse present. The average family size was 2.65.

The population was spread out, with 11.2% under the age of 18, 11.3% from 18 to 24, 7.0% from 25 to 44, 33.6% from 45 to 64, and 36.9% who were 65 years of age or older. The median age was 58.4 years. For every 100 females, there were 100.4 males.

The median income for a household in the CDP was $104,386, and the median income for a family was $203,889. About 5.5% of the population were below the poverty line, all between the ages of 18 and 64 years.

== History ==
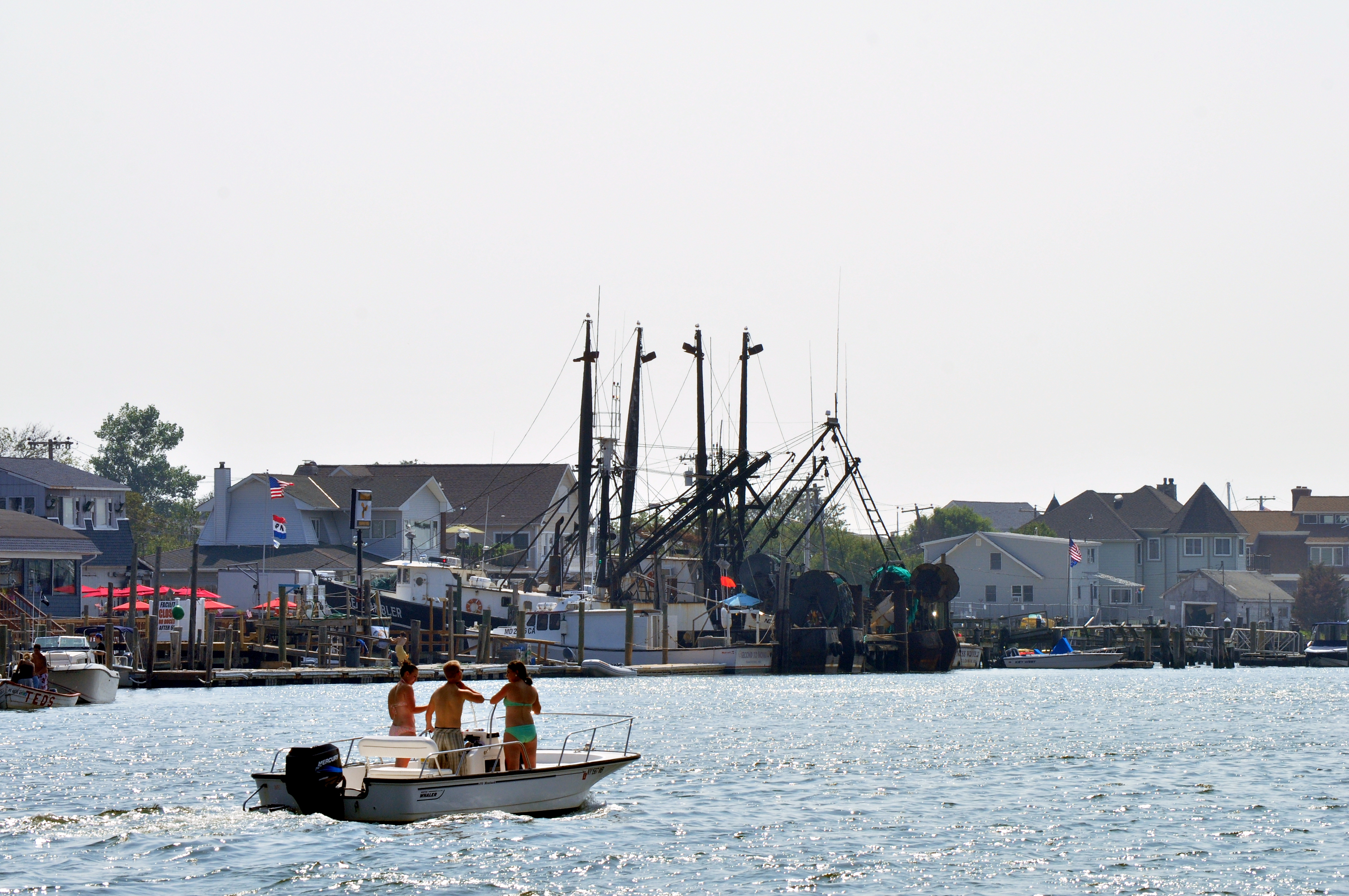
Approaching Point Lookout from the northeast by water (2013).

Point Lookout's first known inhabitants were Merrick (Meroke) Native Americans, a tribe of the Algonquin people. The first European settlers in Point Lookout were Dutch, who arrived in the 1640s, followed by the English, in the 1660s.

In 1906, Senator William Reynolds of Brooklyn led a consortium that purchased the entire barrier island. In 1918, Nassau By the Sea was nearly wiped out by fire. In the 1920s, Senator Reynolds established Point Lookout Inc., which brought in concrete streets and divided the community into small plots which were sold to families for approximately $2,500 a parcel, giving rise to the Point Lookout community. Those bungalows that had not burned in Nassau By the Sea, as well as others from other marsh islands, were moved to Point Lookout and can be seen around the community today. The barrier beach on which Point Lookout sits has been, in one incarnation or another, there for hundreds, if not thousands of years. The first mention of Point Lookout begins to appear in the mid-19th century, as a location for whalers, and as a dangerous spot for ships. A United States Life-Saving Service Station was established at Point Lookout in 1872; ironically, it was due to the tragic wreck of the ship Mexico on January 2, 1837, that a U.S. Life Saving Station was created; the service remained there until farmers grew salt hay on the marshes that stretch behind the site.

A series of hotel and seasonal bungalows was built, as was a seasonal railroad connecting Point Lookout to Long Beach, but nearly all these structures were destroyed over time by either winter storms or fire. During the summer months ferries from the Woodcleft Canal in Freeport brought hundreds of day-trippers to Point Lookout's beaches, and for those who lived in Point Lookout, or in the small community to the east called Nassau By the Sea, the barrier island was a paradise.

In October 2012, Point Lookout was hit by Hurricane Sandy but was largely protected by dunes constructed in the years prior.

During the fall and winter of 2018, with the beach undergoing construction, the Pavilion was torn down.

Point Lookout has small homes, densely packed into very small plots, and does not have sanitary or storm sewers.

== Places of worship ==
Our Lady of the Miraculous Medal Church is located at 75 Parkside Drive, Point Lookout, NY 11561.

Point Lookout Community Church is located at 60 Freeport Avenue, Point Lookout, NY 11569.

=== Emergency services ===
The Point Lookout–Lido Beach Fire Department provides fire protection and emergency medical services to Point Lookout, Lido Beach, and the Loop State Parkway. The department was organized in August 1931.

== Postal services ==
The Point Lookout post office is located at 110 Lido Boulevard in Point Lookout, NY 11569-9700. There are no mail delivery services in Point Lookout.

== Education ==
It is in the Long Beach City School District. Nearby independent schools include Chaminade High School and Kellenberg Memorial High School.

== Notable residents ==
Numerous New York Jets had homes at Point Lookout. Additionally:

- Charles Atlas had a home in Point Lookout
- Chris Burke, best known for his role as "Corky" from the Life Goes On TV series, was born in Point Lookout.
- Harry Chapin lived in and wrote songs about Point Lookout.
- Marlene Dietrich had a home in Point Lookout
- Sidney Hillman lived in Point Lookout in his later years.
- Burl Ives had a home in Point Lookout
- Balaram Stack is a professional surfer from Point Lookout.
- Oscar Wilde visited Point Lookout in 1882.
- Kevin Cahill had a home in Point Lookout.
