= Sarah Ann Barnum =

Sarah Ann Baldwin Barnum was a landowner and political force in late nineteenth century Queens County, NY, including what later became Nassau County. Barnum Island is named after her. She set in motion several important government land transactions. As a result, she gained political importance, in an age where, by law, she could not even vote or hold office.

By 1889, she was called "the best known woman on Long Island." She got out of politics when newspapers ridiculed her maneuvers. Until then, Barnum was able to make or break political careers.

She died on January 3, 1893.

== Political career ==
Barnum was a driving force behind the development of Garden City, NY. She convinced the Town of Hempstead to sell land to A. T. Stewart, which he used to build Garden City. In her other well-known land transaction, she obtained the Barnum Island for the county as a working farm for the homeless.

=== Real estate transactions ===
In 1862, the New York State passed a law allowing Queens County towns to hold votes to sell land to developers. Farmers voted twice against Hempstead selling any land. In the runup to a third vote in 1869, Barnum used her position in the county's Agricultural Society's Ladies Aid organization to educate farmers about the benefits of the sale. The law required the proceeds to be used to fund education and social services. This would offset taxes currently collected to meet the town budget. Her canvassing led to a close vote in favor of the sale, allowing A. T. Stewart to successfully bid on the area.

In 1874, Barnum found out that land speculators were planning to buy Hog Island and build a hotel resort. She had been discussing the status of the county poorhouse with county leaders, and the possibility of using Hog Island for it. The existing poorhouse in Freeport was substandard. During a storm, she found out about the development plans, immediately obtained the help of a neighbor to row across to Hog Island, and beat the developers with her own offer of $13,600 (far below the developers' budget). She turned around the property to the county at the same price, with no profit. A county-sponsored farm soon followed, bringing the poor and vagrants into better conditions, a chance at productivity, and (being an island) isolating them slightly from other population centers. The county renamed Hog Island in her honor.

=== Political rise ===
The two efforts in real estate helped her build strong working relationships with county supervisors, and she was treated as an "eighth member" of the board. Officeholders consulted with her frequently, and no candidate she endorsed ever lost an election.

Barnum was also responsible for the establishment of a mental health facility in Mineola, in the old post office/court house. It was demolished in 1900.

Barnum's influence, especially over the poor farm, was sometimes used to her personal advantage. She was known to take laborers from it for her own farm during the working summer months, and return them to the poor farm at the end of the season. Nevertheless, as head of a public/private partnership overseeing the farm, she made many reforms that were beneficial both to the poor and to the county treasury. She also had an 11-year-old orphan indentured to her by the county, despite the boy having foster parents and grandparents. He was not treated well, violating the indenture contract, which was later determined to be illegal regardless.

At some point, her activities became notorious in the press, and she got out of politics. However, her brother, Francis B. Baldwin, was able to piggyback an influential political career on her previous unofficial position. He became a state assemblyman in 1878, then county treasurer.

== Personal life ==
Barnum was a 7th-generation member of Hempstead's prominent Baldwin family. Her father was Thomas Baldwin. He settled in the Milburn section of Hempstead, opened several enterprises, and became the leading businessman of the area. In 1855, Milburn was renamed in honor of Thomas and his son Francis, eventually taking the name "Baldwin."

Sarah Ann was born c. 1815. Her first marriage was to Samuel Carmen in 1833, when she was 17. They had two daughters. He died in 1842.

She remarried in 1846, to Peter "P. C." Barnum, who had a farm and mansion along Front Street, in the East Meadow area of Hempstead. He owned several clothing stores in New York City (Manhattan), while allowing her to run the farm. She and Peter Barnum had two or three more children. One of these was a son named Joslin.

Peter Barnum died in 1889. Sarah Barnum caught pneumonia on January 2, 1893. She died the next day, and was buried in Greenfield Cemetery. She was 79 years old.
