= Kevin Cahill (physician) =

American physician (1936–2022)

Kevin M. Cahill
- Born: Kevin Michael Cahill; May 5, 1936; The Bronx, New York, U.S.
- Died: September 14, 2022 (aged 86); Point Lookout, New York, U.S.
- Education: Fordham University; Cornell University; London School of Hygiene and Tropical Medicine
- Occupation: Physician
- Spouse: Kathryn McGinity (m. 1961; died. 2004)
- Children: 5
- Relatives: 9 grandchildren

Kevin Michael Cahill (May 5, 1936 – September 14, 2022) was an American physician.

== Biography ==
Cahill was born in The Bronx, New York, the son of Genevieve Campion, a teacher and John Cahill, a physician. He was of Irish descent from his grandparents. Cahill attended Fordham University, graduating in 1957, and Cornell University, where he received his medical degree in 1961. Cahill moved to London, where he attended the London School of Hygiene and Tropical Medicine.

Cahill served in the United States Navy medical corps for two years, after which he established a medical practice in New York. Cahill worked at a clinic along with nun Mother Teresa. He served as senior advisor for 51st Governor of New York, Hugh Carey.

Cahill retired as senior advisor for Carey in 1980. He worked at the New York City Department of Health and Mental Hygiene.

In June 2022, he was sued by Colorado resident Megan Wesko for sexual assault and other matters. Wesko alleged that assaults occurred in January and February 2019.

Cahill died in September 2022 at his home in Point Lookout, New York, at the age of 86.
