= Balaram Stack =

American professional surfer (born 1991)

Personal information
- Born: September 5, 1991 (age 34) Sebastian, Florida, U.S.
- Years active: 2003–present
- Height: 5 ft 8 in (173 cm)
- Weight: 150 lb (68 kg)
- Website: https://www.instagram.com/_balaram

Surfing career
- Sport: Surfing
- Best year: 2019
- Sponsors: VOLCOM, Spy Optics, Chilli Surfboards, Unsound Surf Shop, Rockstar Energy Drink
- Major achievements: Quiksilver Pro New York 2011, WSL World Tour Event (25th); Mexpipe Warriors 2018, Puerto Escondido (1st); Volcom Pipe Pro 2019, WSL World Qualifying Series (4th Place); Red Bull Night Riders, Jacksonville, FL (1st); Da Hui Backdoor Shootout 2022 at Pipeline, North Shore, Oahy (2nd); Vans Pipe Masters 2022, WSL Specialty Event - Invite Only (1st)

Surfing specifications
- Stance: Goofy
- Shaper(s): Jamie Cheal, Chilli Surfboards, Erik Arakawa
- Favorite maneuvers: Airs and barrels

Balaram Stack (born September 5, 1991) is a professional surfer. The youngest of three surfing brothers, Stack was born in Sebastian, Florida, where he began riding waves on a boogie board at three. His family relocated to Long Island when he was five, settling a half-block from the beach in Point Lookout.

In 2004, Quiksilver, the surf industry's top brand, discovered Stack at a surfing camp in Montauk and added him to its team. In 2009, Stack opted for an independent study course load so that he could travel the world and surf. He spent a month on the North Shore of Oahu, surfing the Banzai Pipeline. He went to Tahiti with Clay Marzo, considered the sport's most creative aerialist. In February, Quiksilver sent him to Australia to train with the surf coach Mick Cain, who used video analysis and mental techniques to improve Stack's contest readiness. In April, at the national scholastic East Coast regional championships in Florida, Stack qualified for the finals in four divisions, winning the Air Show and Explorer Juniors divisions. Stack earned three perfect 10 scores during the tournament, an unprecedented performance for a surfer from the Northeast.

Stack won the wildcard and competed in the ASP 2011 Quiksilver Pro New York in September against the world's best. His short documentary "Stacked" premiered in Long Beach, NY on August 30, 2012.

Stack's considered one of the world's top free surfers of his generation. Splitting his time between his home in New York and winters on the North Shore of Oahu, Hawaii. When in Hawaii, Balaram is often found at the famed Banzai Pipeline break.

In 2022, Stack and filmer Ben Gulliver released Hail Mary, a three-year docu-biopic film project on Stack featuring his mother, Mary Stack. In the film, Stack credits his mother for being the guiding force behind his life and providing him the opportunity to pursue surfing from his early days all the way through his competitive achievements. Stack also pays homage to his home of New York, and his surfing community. As of December 2022, Hail Mary has won Best Soundtrack at the 2022 Florida Surf Film Festival, and Best Film and Soundtrack in the 2022 London Surf Film Festival.

At the age of 31, Stack is the first New Yorker to compete in the Pipe Masters (Vans Pipe Masters 2022). One of the most prestigious events in professional surfing at the acclaimed Banzai Pipeline, North Shore, Oahu, Hawai'i. He is also the first New Yorker to make a Pipe Masters Final, and the first New Yorker to ever win a Pipe Masters contest (Vans Pipe Masters 2022).

== Education ==
Balaram graduated from Long Beach High School in 2010.

== Profession ==
He currently is sponsored by Volcom, Spy Optics, Chilli Surfboards, Unsound Surf Shop, PP448, and Rockstar Energy Drink. He regularly participates in surfing competitions.
