= Lido Beach, New York =

- Hamlet and census-designated place
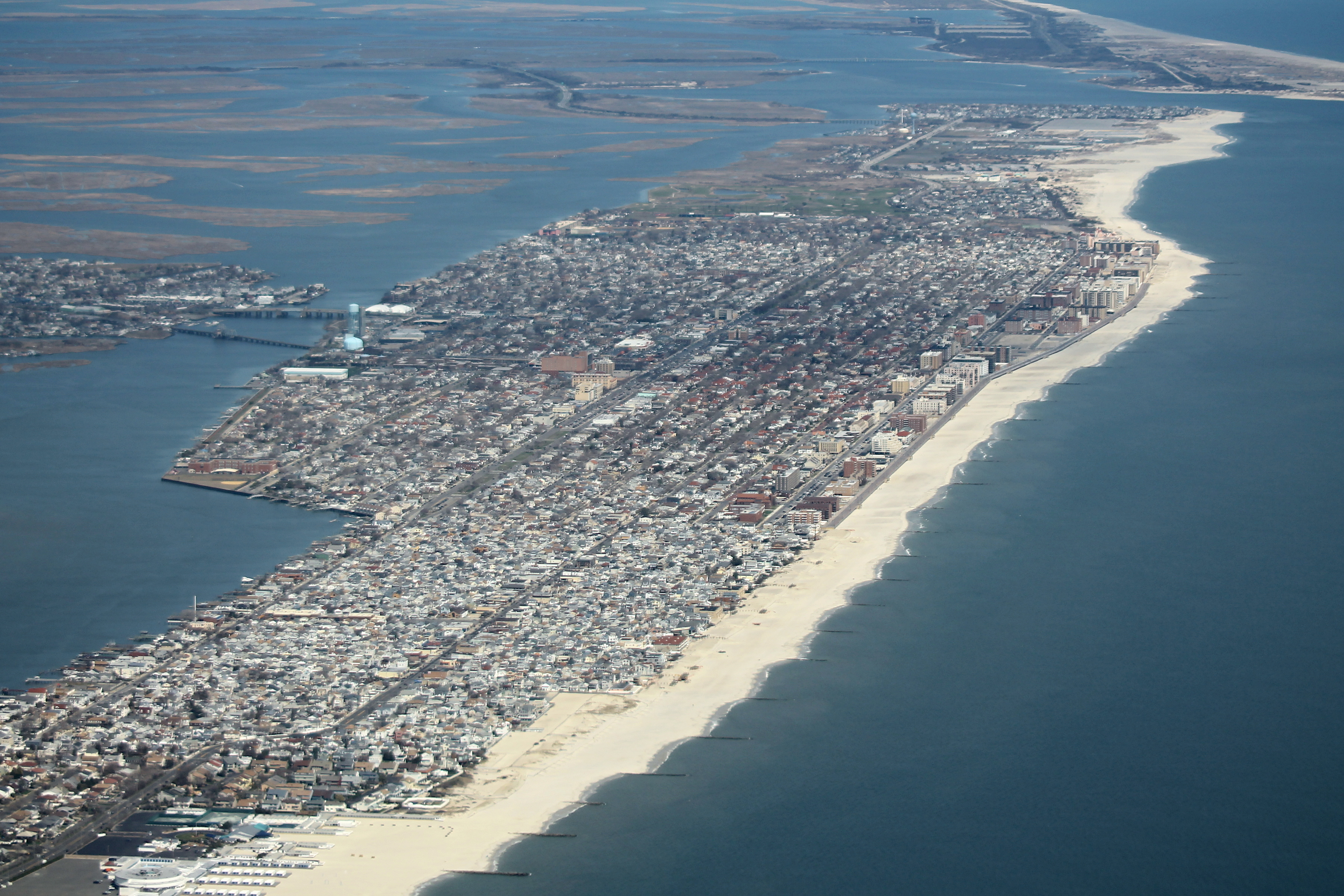
- Aerial image of Lido Beach

- Location in Nassau County and the state of New York.

- Location within the state of New York
- Coordinates: 40°35′17″N 73°37′29″W
- Country: United States
- State: New York
- County: Nassau
- Town: Hempstead

Area
  - Total: 4.42 sq mi (11.45 km^{2})
  - Land: 1.69 sq mi (4.38 km^{2})
  - Water: 2.73 sq mi (7.07 km^{2})
- Elevation: 0 ft (0 m)

Population (2020)
  - Total: 2,719
  - Density: 1,606.4/sq mi (620.25/km^{2})
- Time zone: UTC-5 (Eastern (EST))
  - Summer (DST): UTC-4 (EDT)
- ZIP code: 11561
- Area codes: 516, 363
- FIPS code: 36-42279
- GNIS feature ID: 0955289

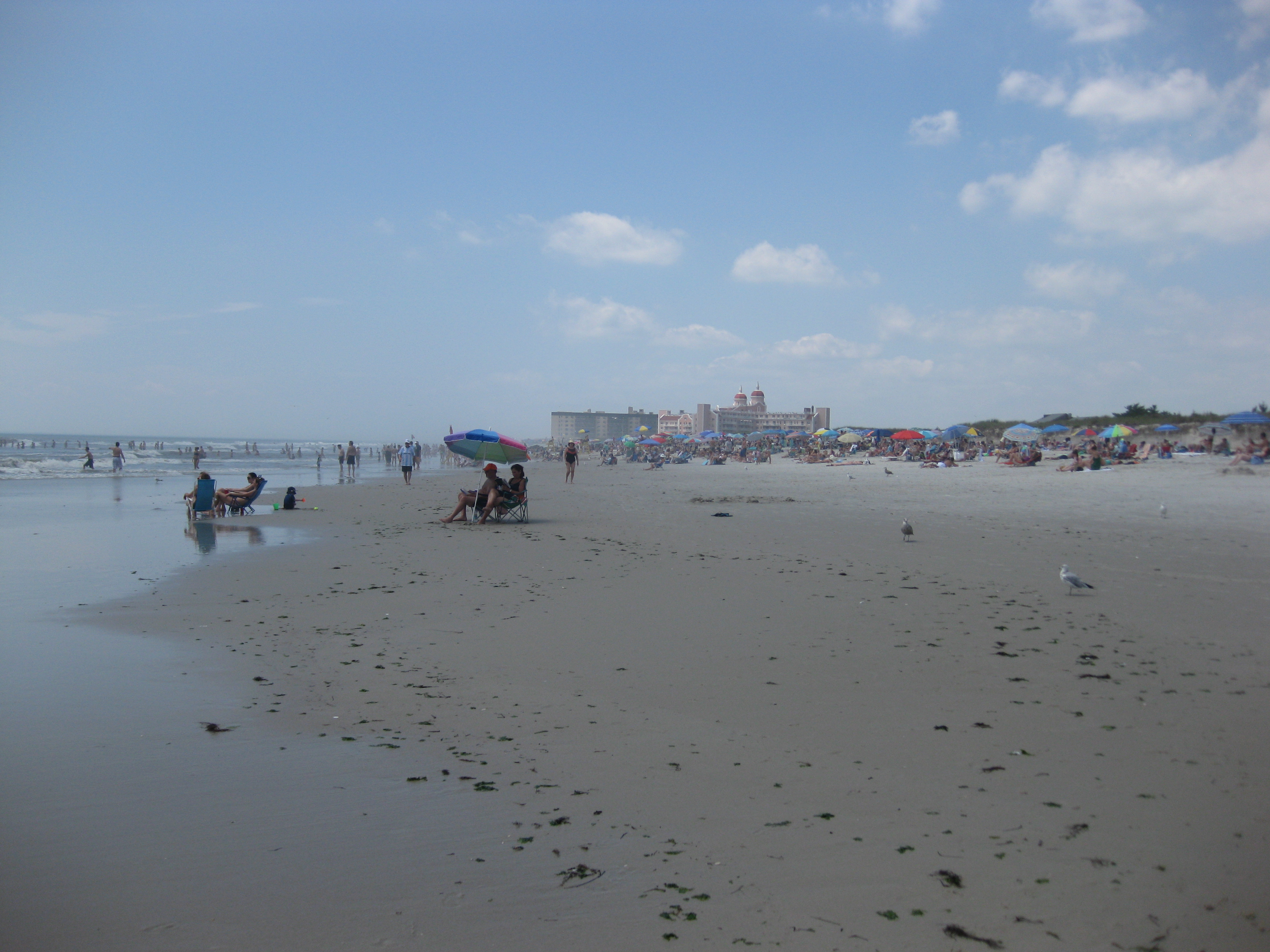
Lido West Town Park – one of several beaches in Lido Beach

Lido Beach is a hamlet and census-designated place (CDP) in the Town of Hempstead in Nassau County, New York, United States. Located on the Long Beach Barrier Island, it is a suburb of the City of Long Beach, and is in the immediate metropolitan area. The population was 2,719 at the time of the 2020 census.

== History ==
Lido Beach was developed by William H. Reynolds, in the early 1900s. The 39-year-old former state senator and real estate developer had already developed four Brooklyn neighborhoods (Bedford-Stuyvesant, Borough Park, Bensonhurst, and South Brownsville), as well as Coney Island's Dreamland, the world's largest amusement park. Reynolds also owned a theater and produced plays.

Beginning in 1906, he gathered investors and acquired the oceanfront from private owners and the rest of Long Beach island from the Town of Hempstead. He planned to build a boardwalk, homes, and hotels, and dredged Reynolds Channel to create the Long Beach, New York resort area. The dredging made the island more accessible to leisure boating.

The Lido Beach community was named after Venice Lido in Italy; "lido" means beach in Italian. In 1929, after Reynolds was defeated for re-election as the Long Beach mayor, he turned his attention to the unincorporated area just east of the city and constructed the Moorish-style Lido Beach Hotel.

== Geography ==
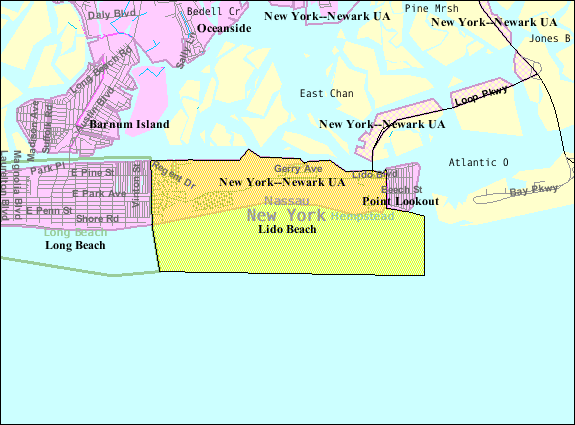
U.S. Census map of Lido Beach.

Lido Beach is located between Long Beach and Point Lookout.

According to the United States Census Bureau, the CDP has a total area of 4.3 square miles (11 km^{2}), of which 1.7 square miles (4.4 km^{2}) is land and 2.5 square miles (6.5 km^{2}), or 59.62%, is water.

== Demographics ==
Historical population
Census	Pop.	Note	%±
2020	2,719		—
U.S. Decennial Census

=== 2020 census ===
As of the 2020 census, Lido Beach had a population of 2,719, with 1,161 households and 813 families residing in the CDP. The median age was 54.5 years. 15.4% of residents were under the age of 18 and 29.9% were 65 years of age or older. For every 100 females there were 89.9 males, and for every 100 females age 18 and over there were 86.4 males age 18 and over.

100.0% of residents lived in urban areas, while 0.0% lived in rural areas. The population density was 1,666.0 inhabitants per square mile (643.2/km^{2}). There were 1,302 housing units at an average density of 806.8 per square mile (311.5/km^{2}).

There were 1,161 households in Lido Beach, of which 20.2% had children under the age of 18 living in them. Of all households, 55.6% were married-couple households, 14.7% were households with a male householder and no spouse or partner present, and 25.7% were households with a female householder and no spouse or partner present. About 30.9% of all households were made up of individuals and 18.4% had someone living alone who was 65 years of age or older.

There were 1,302 housing units, of which 10.8% were vacant. The homeowner vacancy rate was 0.9% and the rental vacancy rate was 4.4%.

Racial composition as of the 2020 census
Race	Number	Percent
White	2,522	92.8%
Black or African American	10	0.4%
American Indian and Alaska Native	0	0.0%
Asian	52	1.9%
Native Hawaiian and Other Pacific Islander	0	0.0%
Some other race	13	0.5%
Two or more races	122	4.5%
Hispanic or Latino (of any race)	148	5.4%

=== Income and poverty ===
The median income for a household in the CDP was $172,857, and the median income for a family was $107,365. Males had a median income of $77,193 versus $68,542 for females. The per capita income for the CDP was $47,604. About 1.8% of families and 11.5% of the population were below the poverty line, including 3.1% of those under age 18 and 8.4% of those age 65 or over.

== Parks and recreation ==
Activities and attractions at Lido Beach include:

- Areas for barbecuing, picnicking, and large gatherings, "with long picnic tables shaded by canopies"
- Carts are available for beachgoers to tote their gear (e.g., coolers and chairs) down to the "sandy beach shore"
- Live entertainment: live concerts are held in the parking lot every summer weekday afternoon
- Sports facilities on land: basketball, bocce, handball, shuffleboard, and volleyball courts
- Water sports: "fishing is allowed in the early hours of the day, and special body boarding areas have been designated on the beach". Surfing is not allowed on Lido Beach but is permitted at Lido West.

Children's activities amenities, and attractions include:

- Arts and crafts lessons
- Spray pools
- Storytelling programs

== Education ==
It is in the Long Beach City School District.

== Notable people ==
(Alphabetized by surname)

- Lester Bernstein, former editor-in-chief of Newsweek
- Rick Rubin, hip hop producer
- Debbie Wasserman-Schultz, Democratic politician

== In popular culture ==
- The movie, Still Alice (2014), was partially filmed in Lido Beach.
- The movie The Godfather was partially filmed at the Lido Beach Hotel in 1969.
- The movie Teenage Mother was filmed in Lido Beach and Long Beach in the late 1960s.
- The alternative rock band Lido Beach is named after the town. Singer/guitarist Scott Waldman is from Lido and previously played bass for The City Drive.
