= Long Beach High School (New York) =

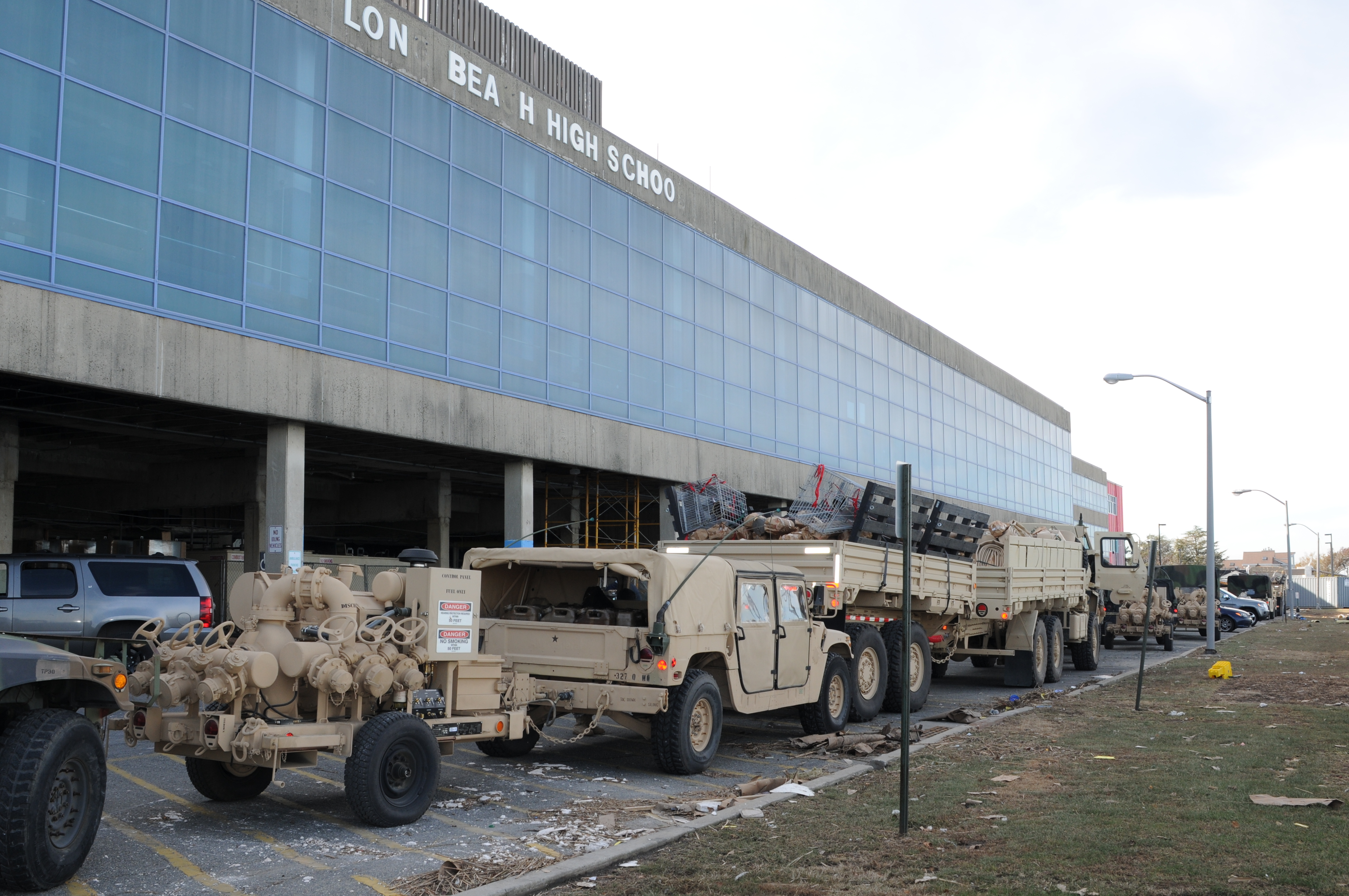
- The school following Hurricane Sandy in 2012.

Location
- 322 Lagoon Drive West; Lido Beach, New York 11561; United States
- Coordinates: 40°35′39″N 73°38′05″W

Information
- Type: Public secondary education in the United States
- Established: 1971
- School district: Long Beach City School District
- Principal: Andrew Smith
- Faculty: 123.69 FTEs
- Enrollment: 1,300 (2023-2024)
- Student to teacher ratio: 10.51
- Colors: Blue, White
- Nickname: Marines
- Publication: Fragments Literary Magazine
- Newspaper: The Tide
- Website: lbeach.org/schools/highschool

Long Beach High School is a public high school in Lido Beach, New York, serving the Long Beach City School District in Long Beach, New York. The school has a 30-acre (12 ha) campus.

As of the 2014-15 school year, the school had an enrollment of 1,324 students and 109.4 classroom teachers (on an FTE basis), for a student–teacher ratio of 12.1:1. There were 302 students (22.8% of enrollment) eligible for free lunch and 40 (3.0% of students) eligible for reduced-cost lunch.

== History ==
Long Beach Junior Senior High School was built in 1939 on Lindell Boulevard in Long Beach. Later, this building was converted to an elementary school and the high school moved to Lido Beach, at the site of what is now the Lido Elementary/Long Beach Middle School complex. Construction of the current location of Long Beach High School, between Lagoon Drive West and Blackheath Road, was completed in 1971. Recently, the school adopted the International Baccalaureate program and currently offers the IB Diploma.

Circa 2008, Island Park Union Free School District began allowing residents to send their high school aged children to Long Beach High, and as increasing numbers of district residents preferred Long Beach High over West Hempstead High School, Long Beach High became the only permitted choice effective the 2019-2020 school year.

== Athletics ==
The school's teams are known as the Marines with a Bulldog as the mascot. They currently compete in District Eight of the New York State Public High School Athletic Association. The sports offered at the school include:

Fall Sports: Cross Country (Separate Male and Female Teams), Football, Cheerleading, Soccer (Separate Male and Female Teams), Badminton (Male Team), Swimming (Female Team), Volleyball (Separate Male and Female Teams), Tennis (Female Team), and the Surf Team (New York State's Only High School Surf Team (Co-Ed))

Winter Sports: Basketball (Separate Male and Female Teams), Swimming (Male Team), Cheerleading, Gymnastics, Winter Track (Separate Male and Female Teams), Wrestling (4X New York State Champions, 16 individual New York State Champions (the most in Nassau County history). and Ice Hockey (Male Team)(Three time New York state small school high school champions 2005, 2010–11 and 2011–12)

Spring Sports: Baseball (Male Team), Softball (Female Team), Golf (Separate Male and Female Teams), Spring Track (Separate Male and Female Teams), Lacrosse (Separate Male and Female Teams), Tennis (Male Team), and Badminton (Female Team)

== Notable alumni ==
- Paul Boesch (1912–1989, class of 1929), professional wrestling promoter and decorated World War II veteran
- Larry Brown (born 1940, class of 1958), professional basketball player and coach
- Billy Crystal (born 1948, class of 1965), actor and comedian
- Jim Fiore (born 1968), Director of Athletics at Stony Brook University from 2003 to 2013
- Eric Foner (born 1943, class of 1959), historian
- Mike Francesa (born 1954, class of 1972), WFAN-NY Sports Radio host
- Andrew Fried (born 1976, class of 1994), producer
- Roger Gengo (born 1992), music entrepreneur
- Scottie Graham (born 1969, class of 1987) former NFL running back
- Louis Ignarro (born 1941, class of 1958), pharmacologist who was awarded the Nobel Prize in Medicine in 1998
- Pete Johnson (born 1954, class of 1972), former NFL running back who played most of his career with the Cincinnati Bengals
- Todd Kaminsky (class of 1996), member of the New York State Senate
- Ed Lauter (1938-2013, class of 1956), actor
- Steven Libutti (born 1964, class of 1982), surgeon and scientist
- Lil Peep (1996–2017, class of 2014), rapper and singer
- Charlie McAvoy (born 1997, class of 2015), NHL defenseman, Boston Bruins
- Mike Portnoy (born 1967, class of 1985), drummer
- Jeffrey Robinson (born 1945, class of 1963), author
- Phil Alden Robinson (born 1950, class of 1967), director and writer
- Rick Rubin (born 1963, class of 1981), record producer
- Edgar Scherick (1924-2002, class of 1941), ABC Television Network executive, Emmy Award-winning producer, and Wild World of Sports creator
- Alan Siegel (born 1938), CEO of Siegelvision, a brand identity consultancy
- Will Skudin (class of 2003), professional surfer
- Balaram Stack (born 1991, class of 2010), professional surfer
- Don Taussig (born 1932), Major League Baseball player
- David Taylor (class of 1978), professional basketball player
- Harvey Weisenberg (born 1933, class of 1952), former member of the New York State Assembly
