= West Hempstead Union Free School District =

School district in the U.S. state of New York

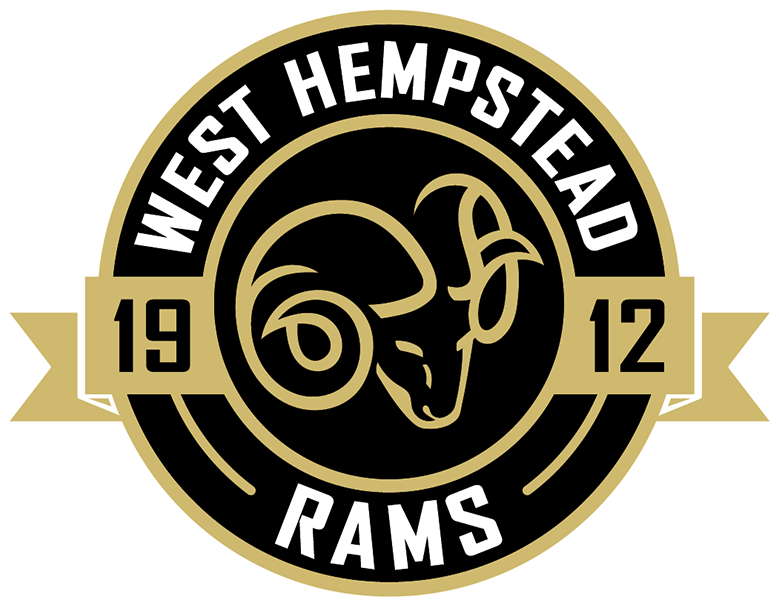
- WHUFSD Rams Logo used since 2025

Address
- 252 Chestnut Street West Hempstead, Nassau County, New York, 11552; United States
- Coordinates: 40°41′5″N 73°39′5″W

District information
- Type: Union Free School District
- Grades: K-12
- President: Karen Brohn
- Vice-president: Kurt Rockensies
- Superintendent: Daniel Rehman
- Asst. superintendent(s): Dina Reilly; Brian Phillips
- School board: Burt Blass; Byars Cole; Joseph Magaraci; Andrea Shinsato; David Lazar
- Schools: 4 (1 kindergarten, 1 primary, 1 intermediate, 1 secondary)
- Budget: $79,908,448.00 (2025–26)
- NCES District ID: 3630660
- District ID: NY-280227030000

Students and staff
- Students: 1,634
- Teachers: 125.00 (on FTE basis)
- Student–teacher ratio: 13.07
- District mascot: Ram
- Colors: Black and Gold

Other information
- Website: www.whufsd.com

The West Hempstead Union Free School District (or West Hempstead School District) is a union free school district situated on Long Island in the hamlet of West Hempstead, Nassau County, New York.

As of the 2024–25 school year, the district had an enrollment of 1,596 students in grades K-12. The district comprises one secondary school (grades 7–12), one intermediate school (grades 4–6), one elementary school (grades 1–3), and one kindergarten.

== History ==
The West Hempstead School District was established in the early 19th century to serve the children residing in the western rural areas of Hempstead. The Chestnut Street School was the first schoolhouse in the district to be established. The school was a single-room building, crowned by a bell tower on the intersection of Chestnut and School Street. Originally, the institution was known as the Trimming Square School, named after the hamlet Trimming Square (now Franklin Square), a village located directly west of West Hempstead. The name has since been changed to the Chestnut Street School, after the street it resides on.

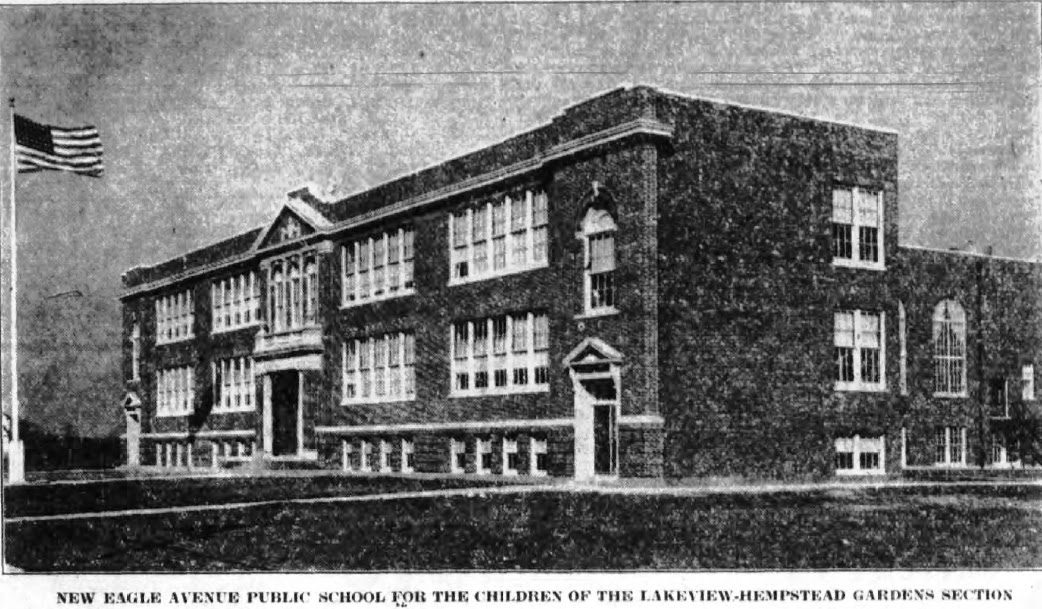
Eagle Avenue Public School

After the establishment of the Chestnut Street School, to accommodate the growing student population, the West Hempstead UFSD began construction on a second school on Eagle Avenue, known as the Eagle Avenue Public School, being opened on November 5, 1928. The school was renamed the Marion M. Delaney school following the retirement in 1963 of the then principal, Marian Delaney, in favor of her 35 years of working with the district. After enrollment took a significant decline in the early 1980s, the district vacated the Marion M. Delaney school building, which was then rented to Nassau County educational officials for usage for the BOCES program, which lasted until 2013. As of 2024, the building is currently leased to the Gersh Academy, a K-12 autism academy.

== Demographics ==
According to the American Community Survey Education Tabulation (ACS-ED) for 2019–23, the West Hempstead UFSD has a population of 19,040 residents total across 5,515 households. The total median household income is $155,506, with 6.4% below the poverty line, and 6.3% receiving SNAP benefits. 92.3% of dwellings are houses, with 7.8% being some other form of lodging. 91.5% of houses have access to Broadband Internet.

Among public school parents, the median household income is $148,558, with 85.3% of parents in the labor force. 86.3% of public school households live in dwellings owned by the householder, while 13.5% are renters. 37.5% of public school parents in West Hempstead have a bachelor's degree or higher, 28.8% with an alternative college degree or associate degree, 25.7% are high school graduates or equivalent, and 7.9% did not complete high school nor have equivalent qualification. Of the district's 1,634 enrolled students, 59.9% of students aged 5 years or over speak only English at home, 32.9% speak English well, and 7.2% speak English less than well. 3.1% of students are classified as having a disability, and 93.6% of students have health insurance coverage.

According to the ACS-ED and National Center for Education Statistics, the estimated racial/ethnic identification makeup of the residents in the area, generally including the school district's enrolled students specifically, is as follows:

- White: 53%
- Black or African American: 12%
- Hispanic or Latino: (Note: Those identifying as Hispanic may also identify as being of any race; anyone identifying as Hispanic is counted once, in this category only.) 26%
- Asian: 5%
- American Indian/Alaska Native: 0%
- Native Hawaiian and other Pacific Islander: 0%
- Some other race alone (Note: Category is excluded from NCES report): 2%
- Two or more races: (Note: Those identifying as two or more races are not included in the count of any other categories; excluding "Hispanic".) 2%

== List of schools ==
=== Current schools ===
The West Hempstead Union Free School District currently operates the four following schools:

- Secondary Schools (Grades 7–12):
  - West Hempstead Secondary School (as of September 1, 2022)
- Intermediate Schools (Grades 4–6):
  - George Washington School
- Primary Schools (Grades 1–3):
  - Cornwell Avenue School
- Kindergartens:
  - Chestnut Street School

=== Former schools ===
As of September 1, 2022, the West Hempstead School District merged West Hempstead High School and West Hempstead Middle School into a single institution, now known as West Hempstead Secondary School.

== Allegations of abuse ==
In April 2025, multiple families filed legal complaints against a former teacher at Cornwell Avenue Elementary School, alleging that six special education students were subjected to physical and emotional abuse by former second-grade teacher, John O'Dwyer. According to a report published by the New York Post, O'Dwyer allegedly "abused one terrified boy, dragged him across the classroom, and even locked him in a dark closet while he screamed for help." Despite concerns reportedly raised by parents and staff regarding the teacher's conduct, district administrators allegedly failed to take action for several months. In a statement to News 12 Long Island, the district confirmed that O'Dwyer has not been employed since the 2023–24 school year.
