= West Hempstead Secondary School =

Location
- 400 Nassau Boulevard; West Hempstead, (Nassau County), New York 11552; United States
- Coordinates: 40.6933°N 73.6610°W

Information
- School type: Public school (government funded), middle school and high school
- Established: c. 1953
- School district: West Hempstead Union Free School District
- NCES District ID: 3630660
- Superintendent: Daniel Rehman
- CEEB code: 335895
- NCES School ID: 363066004124
- Principal: Joseph Pumo
- Faculty: 47.4 FTEs
- Grades: 7–12
- Gender: Coeducational
- Enrollment: 730 (as of 2016-17)
- Student to teacher ratio: 16.8:1
- Campus: Suburb: Large
- Colors: Black and Gold
- Mascot: Rams

West Hempstead Secondary School, formerly West Hempstead High School, is a public middle and high school located in West Hempstead, Nassau County, New York, U.S.A., and is the only secondary school operated by the West Hempstead Union Free School District.

As of the 2014–15 school year, the school had an enrollment of 798 students and 47.4 classroom teachers (on an FTE basis), for a student–teacher ratio of 16.8:1. There were 248 students (31.1% of enrollment) eligible for free lunch and 58 (7.3% of students) eligible for reduced-cost lunch.

As of September 1, 2022, the West Hempstead School District merged West Hempstead High School and West Hempstead Middle School into a single institution, now known as West Hempstead Secondary School.

== History ==
Following the conclusion of World War II, the population in the areas of West, East Hempstead, Roosevelt, and East Meadow had a significant rise. In response to this, the West Hempstead area sought funding for an educational facility, facing initial setbacks in a failed vote. Considerations for temporary classrooms, and multiple site options occurred before the community approved the site on Gustke-Linder in a subsequent vote. Construction commenced on March 17, 1952, but faced minor delays due to a fire. The West Hempstead High School officially opened its doors on September 8, 1953. Originally, students in the area were enrolled at the neighboring, Hempstead High School, but with the creation of a closer school, many students transferred locations. The school's ram mascot, and black-and-gold color scheme were chosen by students, prior to the opening of the district.

From circa 1968 to 2008, the Island Park Union Free School District sent high school students only to West Hempstead High. From circa 2008 to 2018, people living in the Island Park district could select between West Hempstead High and Long Beach High School for high school education. In 2018 the Island Park school district stopped paying for Island Park residents to have the West Hempstead choice, and this was effective the 2019-2020 school year.
