= National Register of Historic Places listings in Long Beach, New York =

This is a list of all National Register of Historic Places listings in the City of Long Beach in Nassau County, New York. The locations of National Register properties for which the latitude and longitude coordinates are included below, may be seen in an online map.

== Listings ==
	Name on the Register	Image	Date listed	Location	City or town	Description
1	Barkin House	Barkin House	May 18, 2015 (#15000234)	84 E. Olive St. 40°35′12″N 73°39′49″W	Long Beach	Late 1940s International Style beach house
2	Cobble Villa	Cobble Villa	January 27, 2015 (#14001214)	657 Laurelton Blvd; 40°35′33″N 73°40′31″W	Long Beach	1912 Mediterranean Revival villa is one of the few remaining properties from seaside resort community developed by William H. Reynolds
3	Pauline Felix House	Pauline Felix House	February 24, 2005 (#05000090)	151 West Penn Street; 40°35′08″N 73°40′20″W	Long Beach	
4	Granada Towers	Granada Towers	May 31, 1984 (#84002750)	310 Riverside Boulevard; 40°35′17″N 73°39′40″W	Long Beach	
5	House at 226 West Penn Street	House at 226 West Penn Street	September 24, 2008 (#08000932)	226 West Penn Street; 40°35′07″N 73°40′15″W	Long Beach	Headquarters for the Long Beach Historical Society.
6	US Post Office-Long Beach	US Post Office-Long Beach	May 11, 1989 (#88002347)	101 East Park Avenue; 40°35′19″N 73°39′39″W	Long Beach	
7	Samuel Vaisberg House	Samuel Vaisberg House	October 5, 2005 (#05001137)	257 West Olive Street; 40°35′13″N 73°40′22″W	Long Beach	

== See also ==
- National Register of Historic Places listings in New York
- National Register of Historic Places listings in Nassau County, New York
