= Long Beach Police Department =

Long Beach Police Department may refer to:

- Long Beach Police Department (California) in California, United States
- Long Beach Police Department (Indiana) in Indiana, United States
- Long Beach Police Department (Mississippi) in Mississippi, United States
- Long Beach Police Department (New York) in New York, United States
- Long Beach Police Department (Washington) in Washington, United States
- Long Beach Township Police Department in New Jersey, United States
