= Long Beach City Hall =

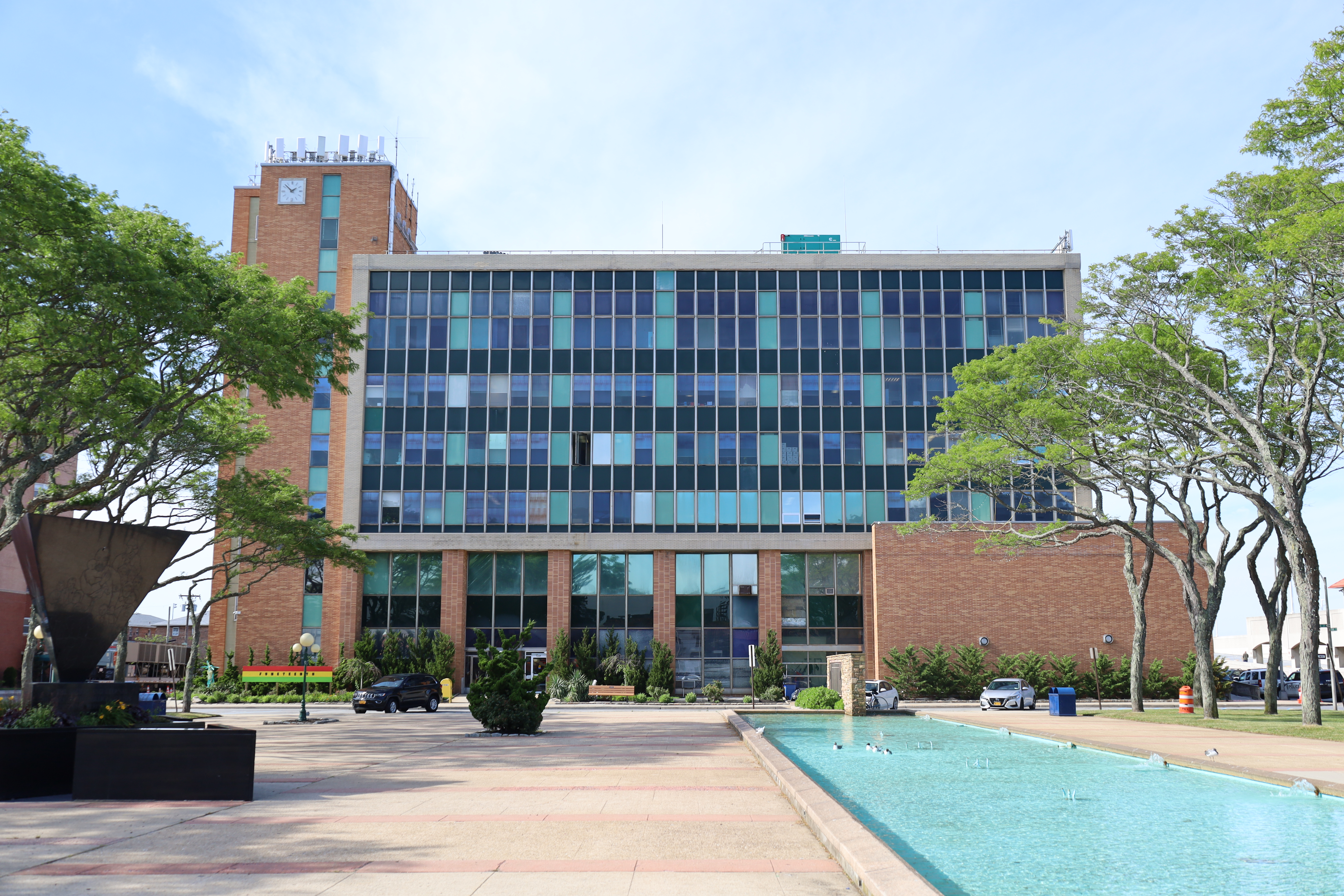
- Long Beach City Hall in 2021, viewed from Kennedy Memorial Plaza
- Interactive map of the Long Beach City Hall area

General information
- Type: Government office
- Architectural style: Mid-century modern
- Location: 1 West Chester Street, Long Beach, NY 11561
- Coordinates: 40°35′23″N 73°39′59″W
- Groundbreaking: March 12, 1962
- Completed: 1964
- Inaugurated: September 27, 1964
- Cost: ~$2,200,000 (1962 USD)
- Owner: City of Long Beach

Technical details
- Floor count: 6

Design and construction
- Architect: Leonard S. Wegman

Other information
- Parking: Yes

Long Beach City Hall is a city hall building within the City of Long Beach, in Nassau County, New York, United States. It serves as the seat and headquarters of Long Beach's municipal government – including the Long Beach City Council, Long Beach Fire Department, Long Beach Police Department, the city's municipal courthouse and jail, and all other municipal officials and agencies.

== Description ==
Long Beach City Hall is located adjacent to the city's Long Island Rail Road station and bus terminal. It was designed in the mid-century modern style by New York-based architect and engineer Leonard S. Wegman. It is six stories tall and was built at a cost of approximately $2,200,000 (1962 USD) – including roughly $50,000 (1957 USD) in federal funds from the Community Facilities Administration; the original construction cost estimate in 1957 was $1,830,000 (1957 USD).

== History ==
The original, Spanish Revival-style Long Beach City Hall, which was located just south of the current structure, was originally built circa 1908, as the sales office of William H. Reynolds – the primary developer and founder of Long Beach.

By 1955, as the Long Beach grew in the post-war era, it was felt by officials and the public that a new, modern building was needed to house the city's government and to better serve the needs of the city; moreover, the existing structure was found to be in a state of disrepair. The proposal continued to be discussed, and in the late fall of 1957, after federal funds were secured that year, the plans for the new structure were officially unveiled to the public. The new structure would be constructed immediately behind the original structure, which would be demolished for parking and a park; the new park would ultimately be known as Kennedy Memorial Plaza, in honor of President John F. Kennedy – whose 1963 assassination in Dallas, Texas occurred while the construction work was taking place.

After years of delays caused by questions on financing and a debate over whether to include the building's construction in an urban renewal project being considered in the immediate vicinity, the current structure's construction was approved in February 1962, with the groundbreaking ceremony and commencement of work occurring on March 12 of that year. Work was completed by mid-1964, and the final City Council meeting to be held in the original building occurred on September 1 of that year. All city offices moved to the new building on September 25, and the official dedication ceremony was held two days later, on September 27, 1964.

The Long Beach City Council initially planned to preserve the original structure's clock tower and make it the centerpiece of Kennedy Memorial Plaza. However, the tower was found to be structurally unsound, forcing its demolition in July 1965.

In 1987, a monument to the six million Jewish victims of the Holocaust and Nazi persecution – and to the non-Jews who fought to save and protect them – was dedicated in front of Long Beach City Hall, in Kennedy Plaza. The dedication occurred on June 7 of that year.

== See also ==
- Long Beach Holocaust Memorial Monument
- Bellerose Village Municipal Complex
