= Long Beach Fire Department =

Long Beach Fire Department may refer to:

- Long Beach Fire Department (California) - The fire department for Long Beach, California.
- Long Beach Fire Department (New York) - The fire department for Long Beach, New York.
