= Harriet Eisman Community School =

School in New York, United States

Coordinates: 40°35′20.2″N 73°39′32.6″W

The Harriet Eisman Community School is an alternative high school located in Long Beach, New York, United States. Although this is an alternative high school, this school is registered with the New York State Education Department, therefore students who complete the necessary requirements will graduate with a High School Diploma.
