= Ocean Beach Park (Long Beach, New York) =

Park and beach in Long Beach, New York, United States

- Long Beach
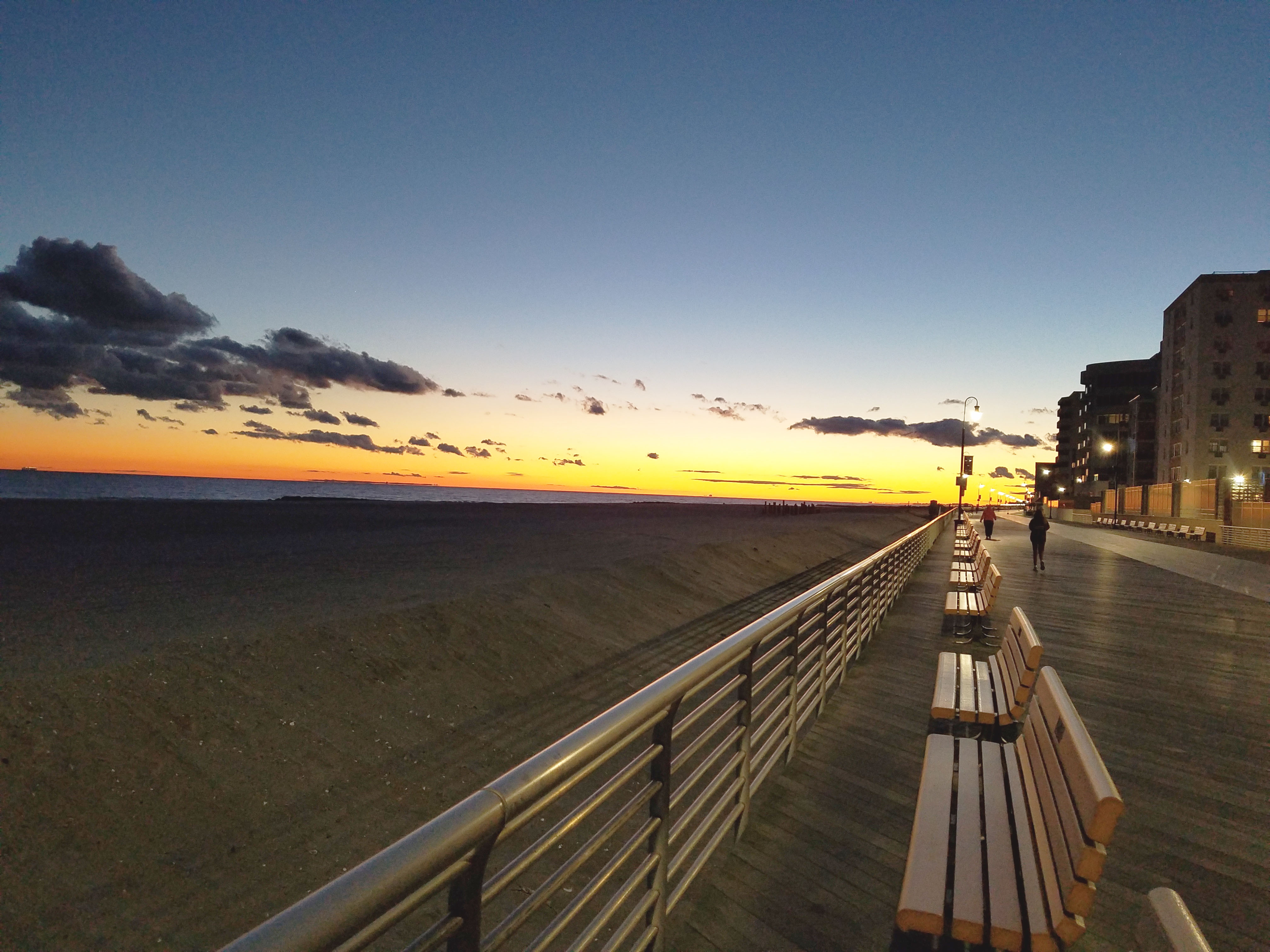
- Ocean Beach Park in 2019
- Interactive map of Ocean Beach Park
- Type: Public
- Location: Long Beach, New York
- Coordinates: 40.58352°N 73.67288°W
- Area: 4.1 miles (6.6 km) in length
- Owner: City of Long Beach
- Operator: City of Long Beach
- Website: www.longbeachny.gov/beach

Ocean Beach Park (more commonly known as Long Beach) is a public park and beach owned and operated by the City of Long Beach, in Nassau County, New York, United States. It fronts the Atlantic Ocean.

The beach is one of the region's best-known destinations, and both it and the city of Long Beach are often considered by the media and public as being synonymous with one another.

== Description ==
Ocean Beach Park is located along the southern shore of the Long Beach Barrier Island, within the City of Long Beach and fronting the Atlantic Ocean. The beach stretches for 4.1 miles (6.6 km) along the shoreline, and additionally contains a 2.1-mile (3.4 km) boardwalk.

During the summer season, a fee or beach pass is required to use the beach. Revenues raised are collected by the city, and the beach is among the largest sources of revenue for the city.

On the north side of the boardwalk, there are various buildings, including condominiums, apartments, and eateries. It also serves as a center for the community, hosting events such as crafts fairs. The benches on the boardwalk contain plaques, which can be purchased to memorialize others.

The Transcontinental Pipeline passes beneath the beach, where it comes ashore after traveling beneath New York Bay and the Atlantic Ocean from New Jersey across the New York–New Jersey Bight; from its landing point beneath Ocean Beach Park, the pipeline continues a short distance north to its terminus: the Island Park Energy Center on nearby Barnum Island.

== History ==
Ocean Beach in 1923

Ocean Beach Park can trace its origins in its modern form back to the development of Long Beach by William H. Reynolds at the turn of the 20th century into a resort community. Its original boardwalk was first built in 1907, with access by invitation only; it later became a public amenity open to the general public. To draw attention to the project, Reynolds brought in two elephants, named Roger and Alice, from the nearby Dreamland in Coney Island. The boardwalk was intended to be five miles, with two miles completed by 1909. Over time, the boardwalk sustained damage from storms and fires, and had sections rebuilt.

Damage to the boardwalk following Hurricane Sandy

The beach sustained significant erosion and damage to many of its facilities in 2012 from Hurricane Sandy – including the destruction of its boardwalk. The beach was subsequently restored, and the boardwalk and other damaged its facilities were rebuilt the following year; the boardwalk was rebuilt at a cost of $42 million.

Since 1998, a polar bear plunge has been held at Ocean Beach annually on Super Bowl Sunday to raise donations for the Make-A-Wish Foundation. In 2015, the Long Beach City Council enacted a new local law, banning smoking on the beach and boardwalk.

== See also ==
- Jones Beach State Park
- Rockaway Beach and Boardwalk
