= Long Beach Public Library (New York) =

Public library in Long Beach, New York

Coordinates: 40°35.33′0″N 73°40.04′0″W

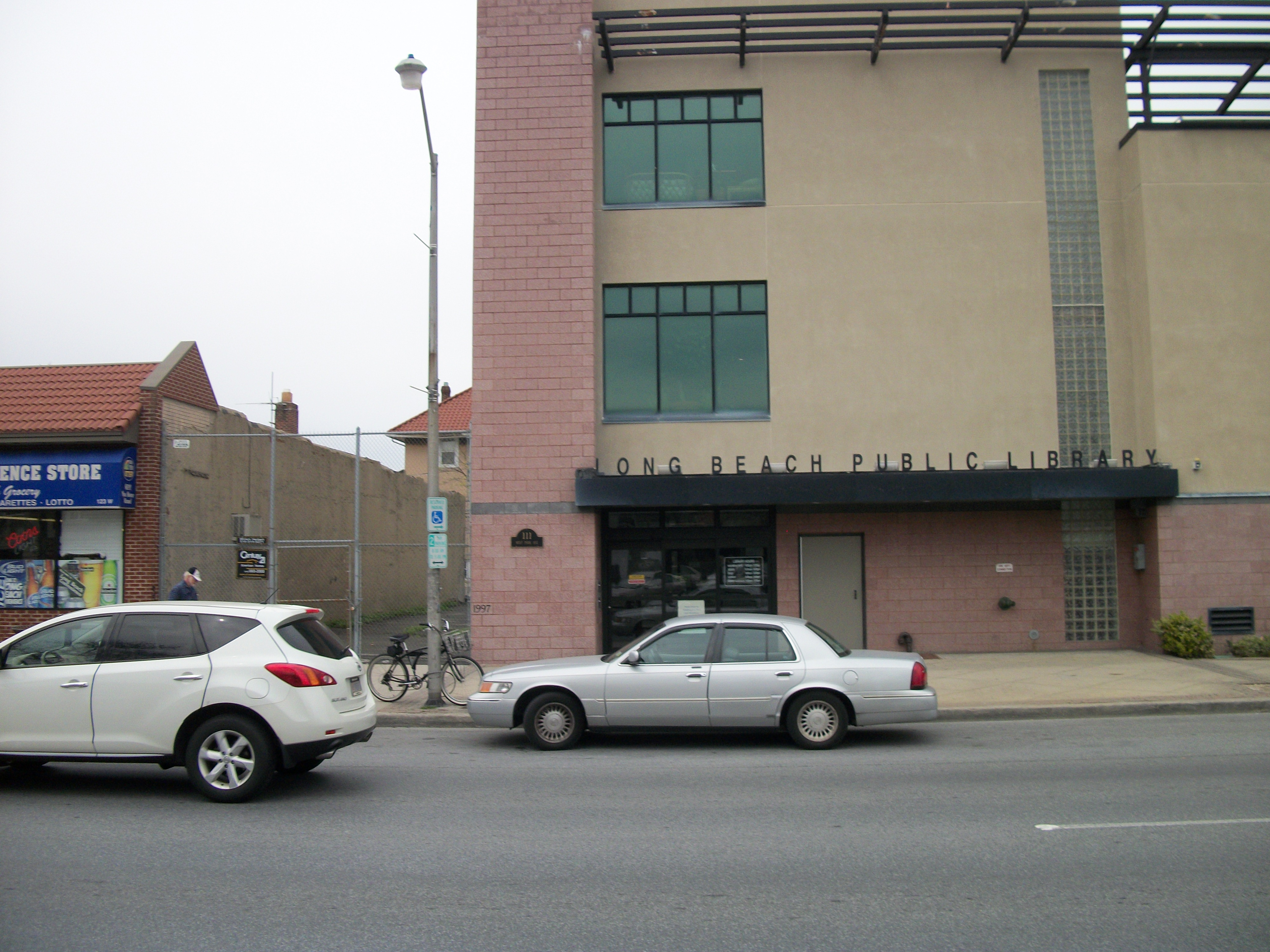
- Headquarters for the Long Beach Public Library
- Location: Long Beach, New York
- Type: Public library
- Established: 1928
- Branches: 2 (Point Lookout; West End)

Other information
- Website: www.longbeachlibrary.org

The Long Beach Public Library is the public library of Long Beach, New York, serving the civic, cultural, educational and recreational needs of the community. The central library has two branches: one in Point Lookout and the other in the West End neighborhood of the City of Long Beach, off New York Avenue.

== History ==
The Long Beach Public Library was founded in 1928 and had its first site at 124 West Park Avenue. The original site has been declared a landmark by the Long Beach Historical Society just above the popular Sutton Place Bar and Grill. in 2018, the owners of Sutton Place destroyed the original library.

The first year the Library was open, more than 2000 people registered for library cards. Seven years later the Library needed a bigger space so it moved its location near the Long Island Rail Road. Although the space was bigger, many patrons complained about noise, so a new location was needed.

The library moved to its current three-story building in 1954. In 1997, the Library underwent a major renovation.

Damage from Hurricane Sandy in late October 2012 closed the main library until the following March. The much smaller West End branch remained closed.

== Special features ==
=== Youth Services Department ===
The Long Beach Public Library is expanding the traditional role of library services; Family Place Libraries are centers of early childhood information, parent education, emergent literacy, socialization, and support for families with children from birth through high school. Long Beach is one of 26 Family Place Libraries on Long Island and 122 communities in 22 states.

The Library offers several story-times.

=== Classes and programs ===
Live Homework Help: Live Tutors for Children and Adults: Children in grades k–12, college students, and adult learners can work with live tutors between 2-10pm; 7 days a week from home or in the Library. Students working from home need a PC and their library barcode. This Service is free. Patrons can click on the LIVE HOMEWORK HELP icon on the Library's main webpage.

Tutors work with students, one at a time, in English or Spanish va a chat box and a white board. There is no time limit per session. Subjects include English, Math, Science and Social Studeies and study for standardized tests for K–12. Help is available for Science Fair, final exams and entrance exams. All tutorials are based on New York State Education department curriculum.

=== Book sales ===
The library has a continuous Book Sale occurring on the library's Main Floor. The library accepts donations of books, tapes/CDs, old maps, old postcards, children's books, and magazines.
