= Long Beach Holocaust Memorial Monument =

Holocaust memorial in New York, United States

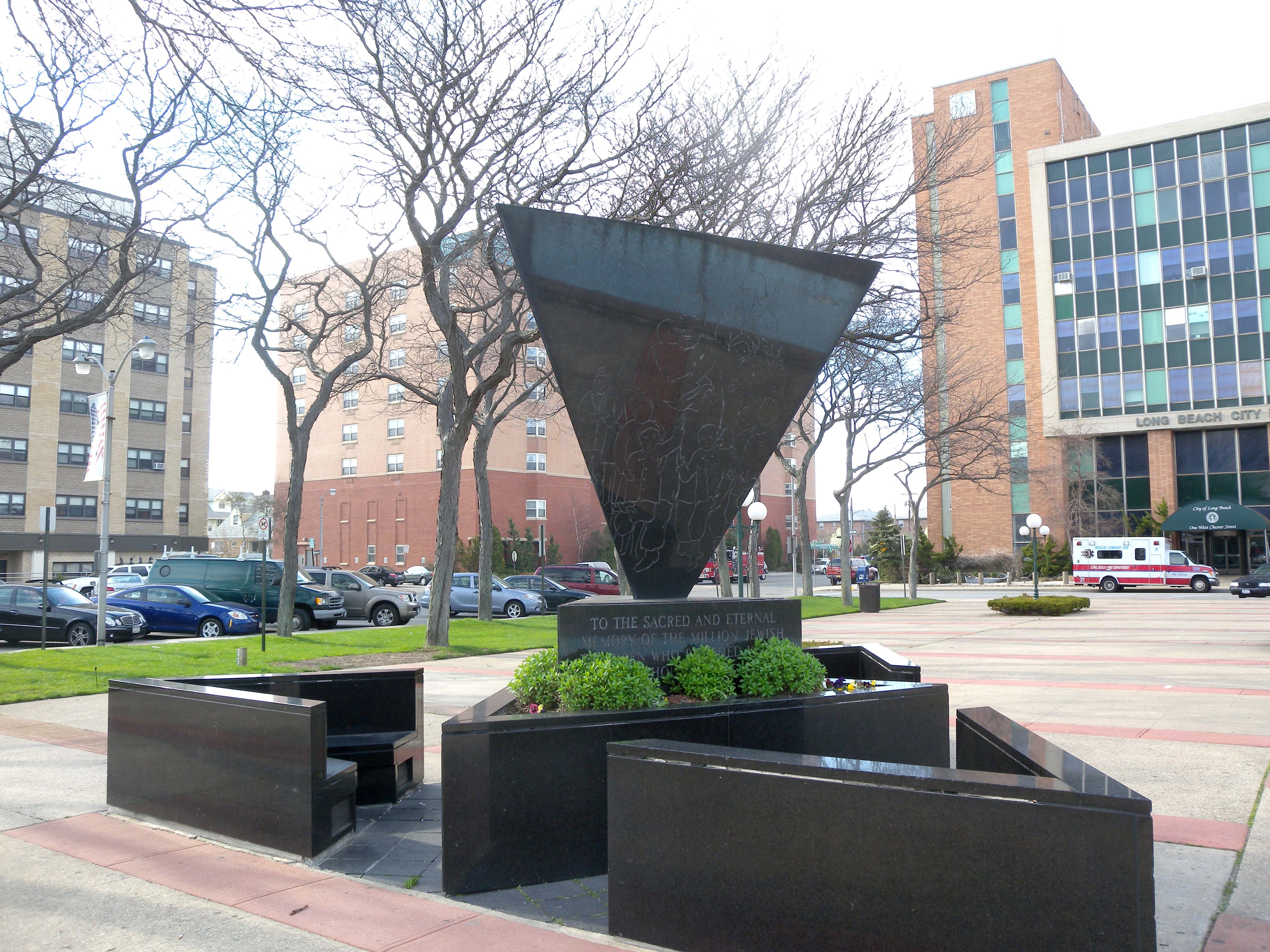
- Interactive map of Long Beach Holocaust Memorial Monument
- Location: Kennedy Plaza at the Long Beach City Hall, Long Beach, Nassau County, New York
- Coordinates: 40.589138°N 73.666464°W
- Type: Public Holocaust memorial
- Material: Black granite
- Dedicated date: June 7, 1987
- Dedicated to: the six million Jews who were victims of Nazi persecution and the non-Jews who tried to save them

The Long Beach Holocaust Memorial Monument is a public Holocaust memorial situated in Kennedy Plaza at the Long Beach City Hall W. Park Ave between Center St. and National Blvd. in Long Beach, New York, USA.

The Monument was dedicated June 7, 1987, by the Holocaust Memorial Committee as a memorial to the six million Jews who were victims of Nazi persecution and the non-Jews who tried to save them.

== History ==
The Monument was designed by Dr. Stanley Robbin and Architect Monte Scott Leeper. Robbin was a holocaust survivor from the Schindlerjuden and Oskar Schindler’s physician and the chairman and founder of the Long Island Holocaust Memorial Commission.

Robbin first started working on the idea in 1982, and the dedication took place on June 7, 1987. It was joined by 250 people, Including New York senator Al D'Amato, Lieutenant Governor of New York Stan Lundine United states Congressman Raymond J. McGrath, NYS Assemblyman Jerry Kremer and Long Beach Supervisor Bruce Nyman. Upon its unveiling, the memorial received international recognition and was the subject of an Austrian Broadcasting Corporation’s documentary.

A steel sculpture by artist Allen Bertoldi called "Homage to Noguchi" erected in 1979 was removed to make place for the Holocaust Monument. The sculpture was moved to Nassau County Museum of Art in Roslyn Harbor.

== Design ==
The monument consists of an inverted pyramid made of highly polished black granite containing white etchings on each of its sides. It is mounted on a three-sided base also containing etched inscriptions which is itself set in a larger three-sided base filled with plantings. The sculpture and its base are surrounded by three triangular-shaped benches.

The monument is 12 feet high and the base is 10 by 10 by 10 feet.

Each site of the inverted pyramid and three-sided base are etched with inscriptions.

One panel of the pyramid depicts Janusz Korczak accompanying a group of Jewish orphans from the Warsaw Ghetto to death in the gas chambers of the Treblinka extermination camp. A Nazi SS guard stands in the background. Korczak is bearded and cradles a young child in his proper left arm as other children surround him and hold on to his coat.

On the base beneath this panel are the words: “To the sacred and Eternal Memory of the Million Jewish Children; who perished in the Holocaust”.

Another panel of the pyramid is an etching of the Burning bush with barbed wire across the fire. Commemorating the Extermination camp.

On the base beneath this panel are the words: “The Burning Bush which was not consumed”.

The third panel contains the names of Raoul Wallenberg, Oskar Schindler and Maximillian Kolbe. On the base beneath this panel are the words: “Their Brother Keepers”.

On the lower base are five plaques.

On Plaque one: The erection of this monument was funded by Honorary Chairman Dr. NATAN CELNIK in memory of his wife URSULA Resistance Fighters.

On Plaque two: This monument was proposed and erected by the HOLOCAUST MEMORIAL COMMITTEE of LONG ISLAND Executive Committee: Stanley R. Robbin MD Chairman and Founder Artist of the 3 Triangular Panels Vice Presidents: Robert E. Link Matthew McCarthy Henry D. Zukor Treasurer: Hon. Pearl Weill Celia L. Avnet Simon Berger Rev. Thomas Donohoe Hon. Jerome B. Fleischman Rev. Michael F. Guinan Rabbi Abraham M. Mann Executive Director: Joseph S. King.

On Plaque three: This monument has been erected with the advice, consent and support of the officials of the City of Long Beach 1981-1987 City Council: Hon. Kevin Braddish, president Hon. Pearl Weill, vice-president Hon. Bruce Bergan Hon. Stanley Smolken Hon. Harvey Weisenberg City Court Judge: Hon. Roy Tepper City Manager: Edwin L. Eaton Supervisors: Hon. Hannah Komanoff Hon Bruce Nyman.

On Plaque four: The concept, design and structure of this monument is an original creation of architect Monte Leeper.

On Plaque five: The pictorial part of this monument consisting of white colored etchings and inscriptions engraved on black granite, was an original design of Stanley R. Robbin, MD.

== Restoration ==
After years of decay and the physical impacts of Hurricane Sandy the monument underwent a two-year restoration completed in June 2016.

The restoration was largely paid by Assemblyman Harvey Weisenberg and the General Restoration Associates.
