= Pauline Felix House =

Historic house in New York, United States

- U.S. National Register of Historic Places
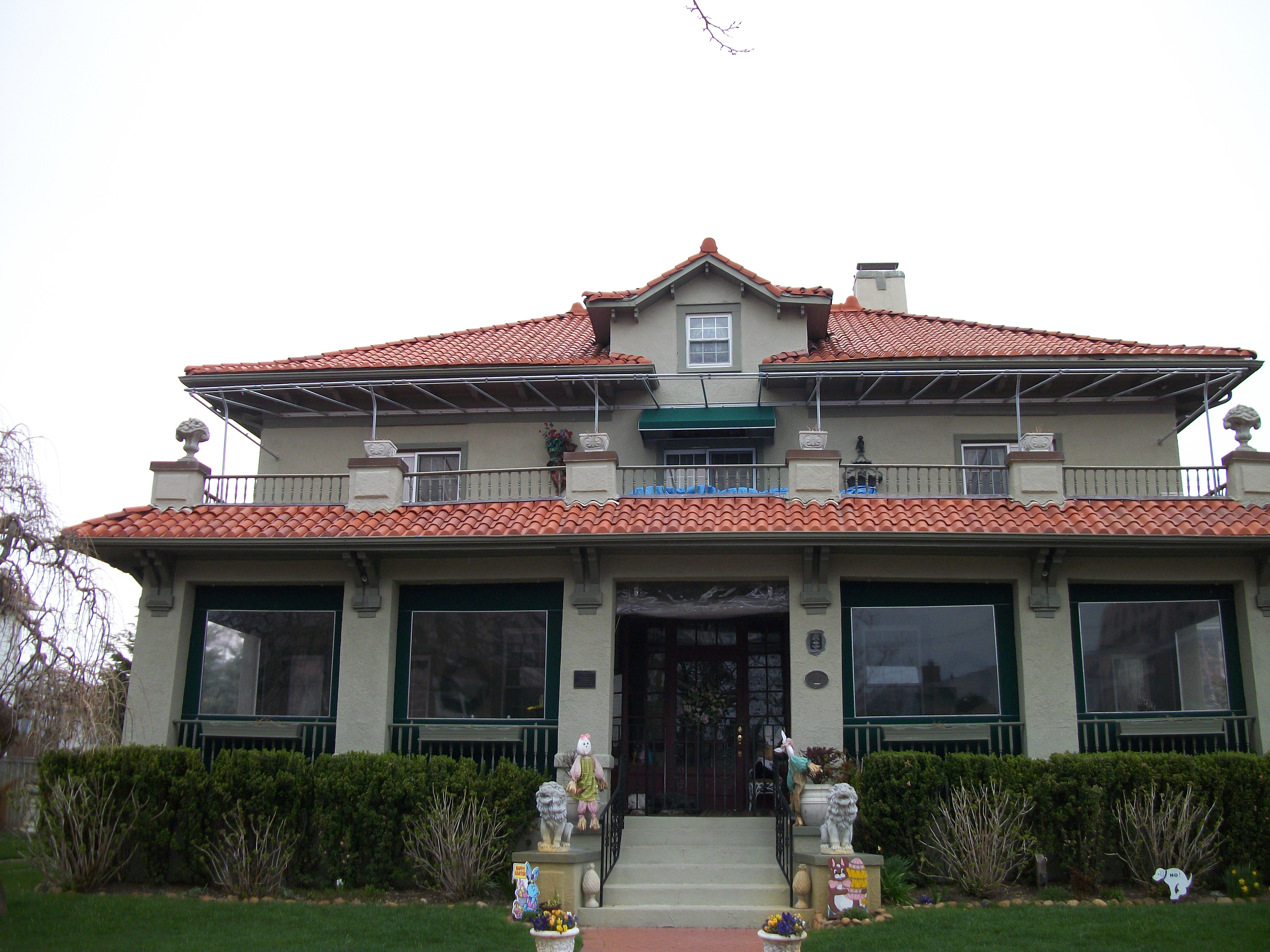
- The Pauline Felix House

- Location within New York Location within the United States
- Location: 151 West Penn Street; Long Beach, New York
- Coordinates: 40°35′8″N 73°40′20″W
- Area: less than one acre
- Built: 1909
- Architectural style: Renaissance
- NRHP reference No.: 05000090
- Added to NRHP: February 24, 2005

Pauline Felix House is a historic home located at Long Beach in Nassau County, New York. It was built in 1909 and is a 2 1/2-story, Italian Renaissance–style residence with a stucco exterior and a clay tile hipped roof. It features a portico supported by six evenly spaced square posts and running the full width of the facade.

It was listed on the National Register of Historic Places in 2005.
