= United States Post Office (Long Beach, New York) =

- US Post Office-Long Beach
- U.S. National Register of Historic Places
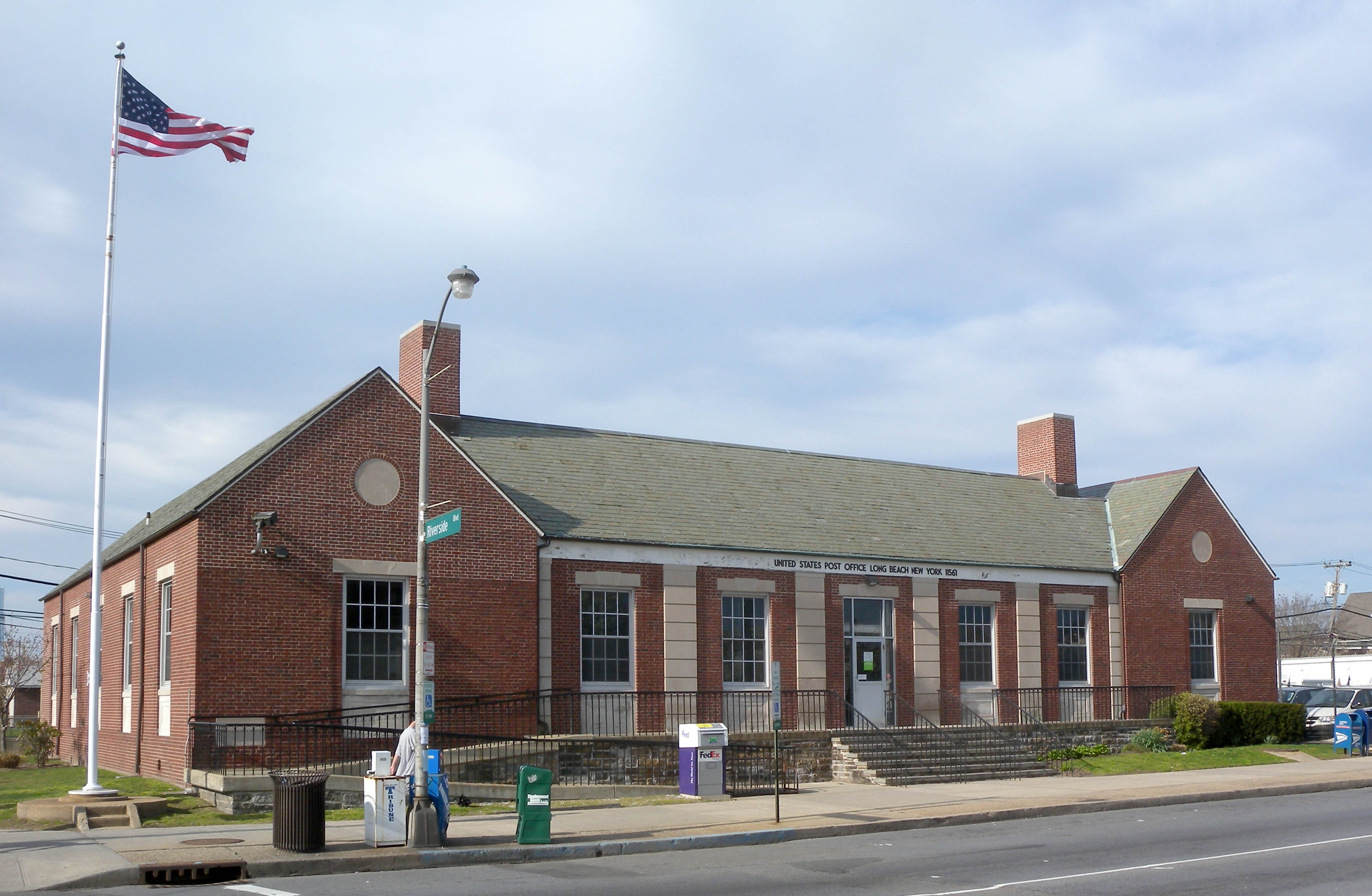
- Long Beach Post Office, April 2009

- Location within New York Location within the United States
- Location: 101 East Park Avenue; Long Beach, New York
- Coordinates: 40°35′19″N 73°39′39″W
- Area: less than one acre
- Built: 1936
- Architect: Simon, Louis A.
- Architectural style: Colonial Revival
- MPS: US Post Offices in New York State, 1858-1943, TR
- NRHP reference No.: 88002347
- Added to NRHP: May 11, 1989

US Post Office-Long Beach is a historic post office building located at Long Beach in Nassau County, New York, United States. It was built in 1936 and designed by the Office of the Supervising Architect under the direction of Louis A. Simon. It is a one-story, symmetrically massed building faced with red brick in the Colonial Revival style. It features a central five bay wide section with a gable roof, flanked by single bay end pavilions with gable roofs perpendicular to the central section. The lobby features a Treasury Section of Fine Arts mural by Jon Corbino titled The Pleasures of the Bathing Beach (1939).

It was listed on the National Register of Historic Places in 1989.
