= Cobble Villa =

Historic house in New York, United States

- U.S. National Register of Historic Places
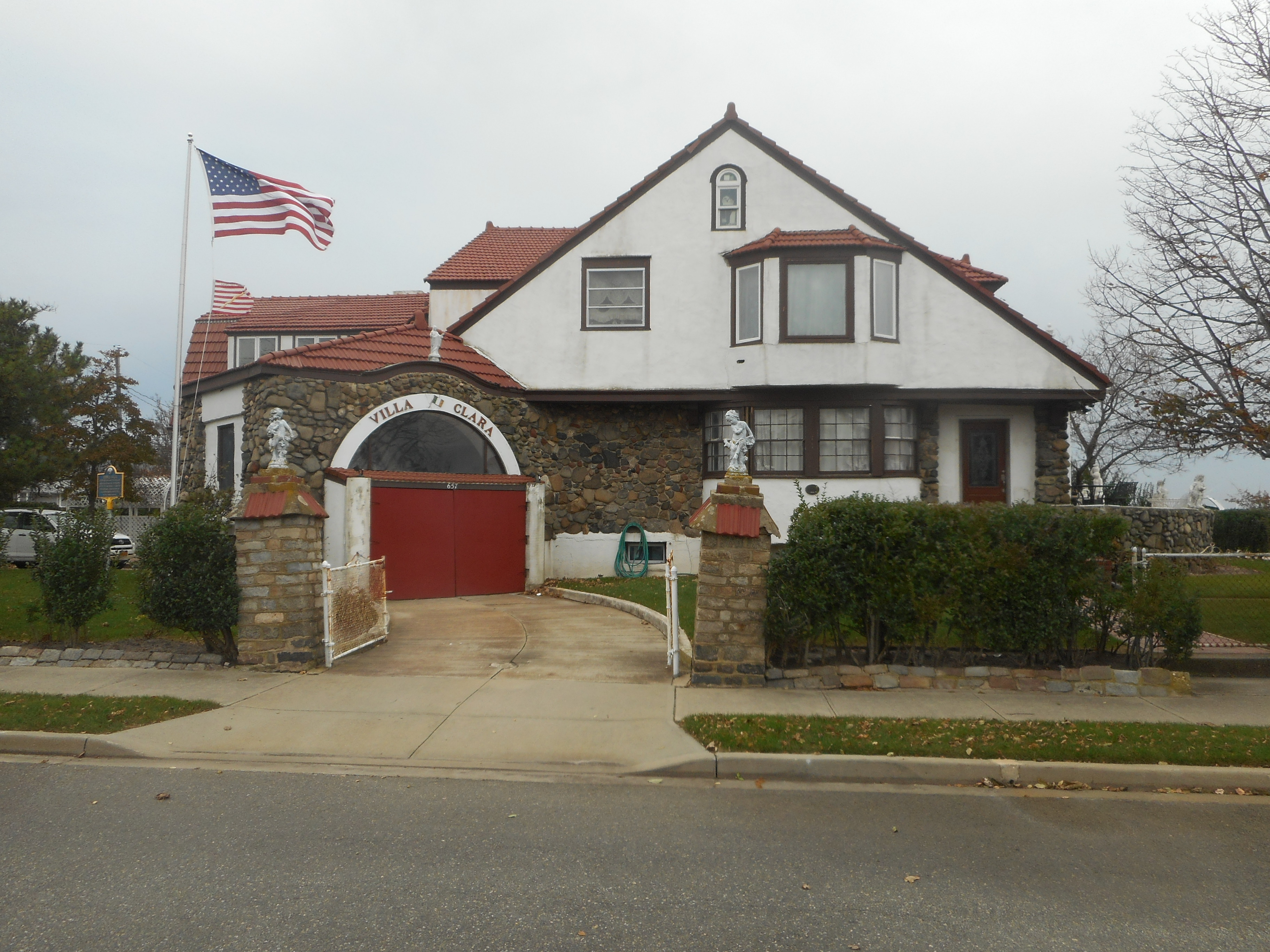
- Cobble Villa in November 2017

- Location within New York Location within the United States
- Location: 657 Laurelton Blvd, Long Beach, New York
- Coordinates: 40°35′33.3″N 73°40′22.1″W
- Area: 0.32 acres (0.13 ha)
- Built: c. 1912
- Built by: Elmohar Company
- Architectural style: Mediterranean Revival
- Demolished: November 2025
- NRHP reference No.: 14001214
- Added to NRHP: January 27, 2015

Cobble Villa, also known as Villa Clara, was a historic home located at Long Beach in Nassau County, New York. It was built about 1912, and was a 2 1/2-story, asymmetrical Mediterranean Revival style brick and stuccoed dwelling. It consisted of an L-shaped core, a two-story gambrel roofed addition, and a one-story porte cochere. The building featured a varied, multi-gabled roofline covered in red terra cotta tile. It was built as the nascent resort's first showpiece and a demonstration of its developer's vision.

It was listed on the National Register of Historic Places in 2015 and despite a dedicated preservation effort from the community, the home was ultimately demolished by the property owner in 2025 due to its state of decay and burden in repairs.
