= Barkin House (Long Beach, New York) =

Historic house in New York, United States

- U.S. National Register of Historic Places
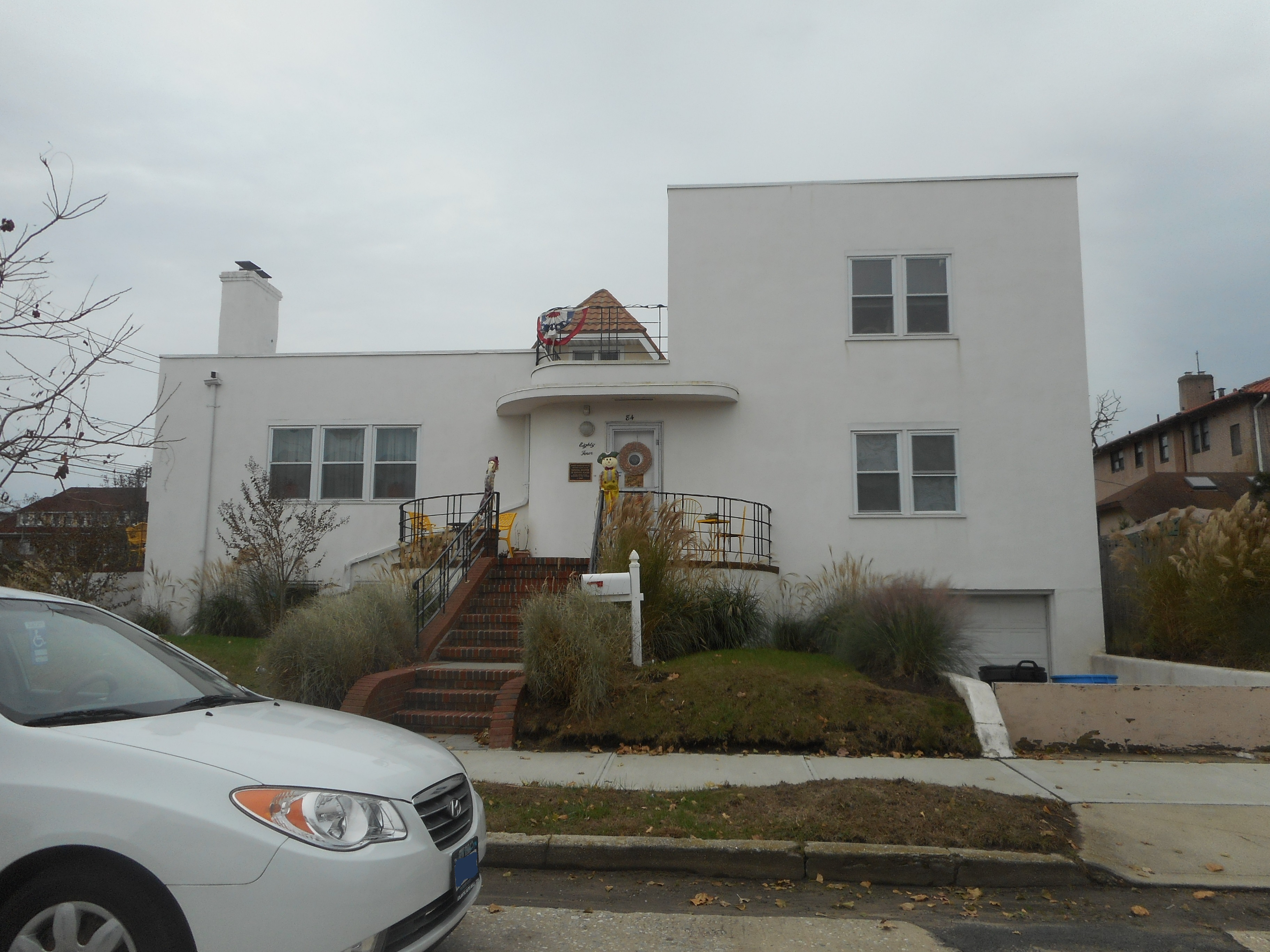
- The William Barkin House in November 2017.

- Location within New York Location within the United States
- Location: 84 E. Olive St., Long Beach, New York
- Coordinates: 40°35′13″N 73°39′41″W
- Area: 0.14 acres (0.057 ha)
- Built: c. 1946-1947
- Built by: William Barkin
- Architect: S. Walter Katz
- Architectural style: International Style
- NRHP reference No.: 15000234
- Added to NRHP: May 18, 2015

The Barkin House is a historic house located at 84 East Olive Street in Long Beach, Nassau County, New York.

== Description and history ==
It was built in 1946–1947 by William Barkin, and is a multi-story International Style, stuccoed concrete block dwelling with a flat roof. It consists of a three-bay wide, two-story section, an entry bay, and a three-bay wide, one-story section. The house features sun porches with tubular metal railing and playful nautical touches.

It was listed on the National Register of Historic Places on May 18, 2015.
