= House at 226 West Penn Street =

Historic house in New York, United States

- U.S. National Register of Historic Places
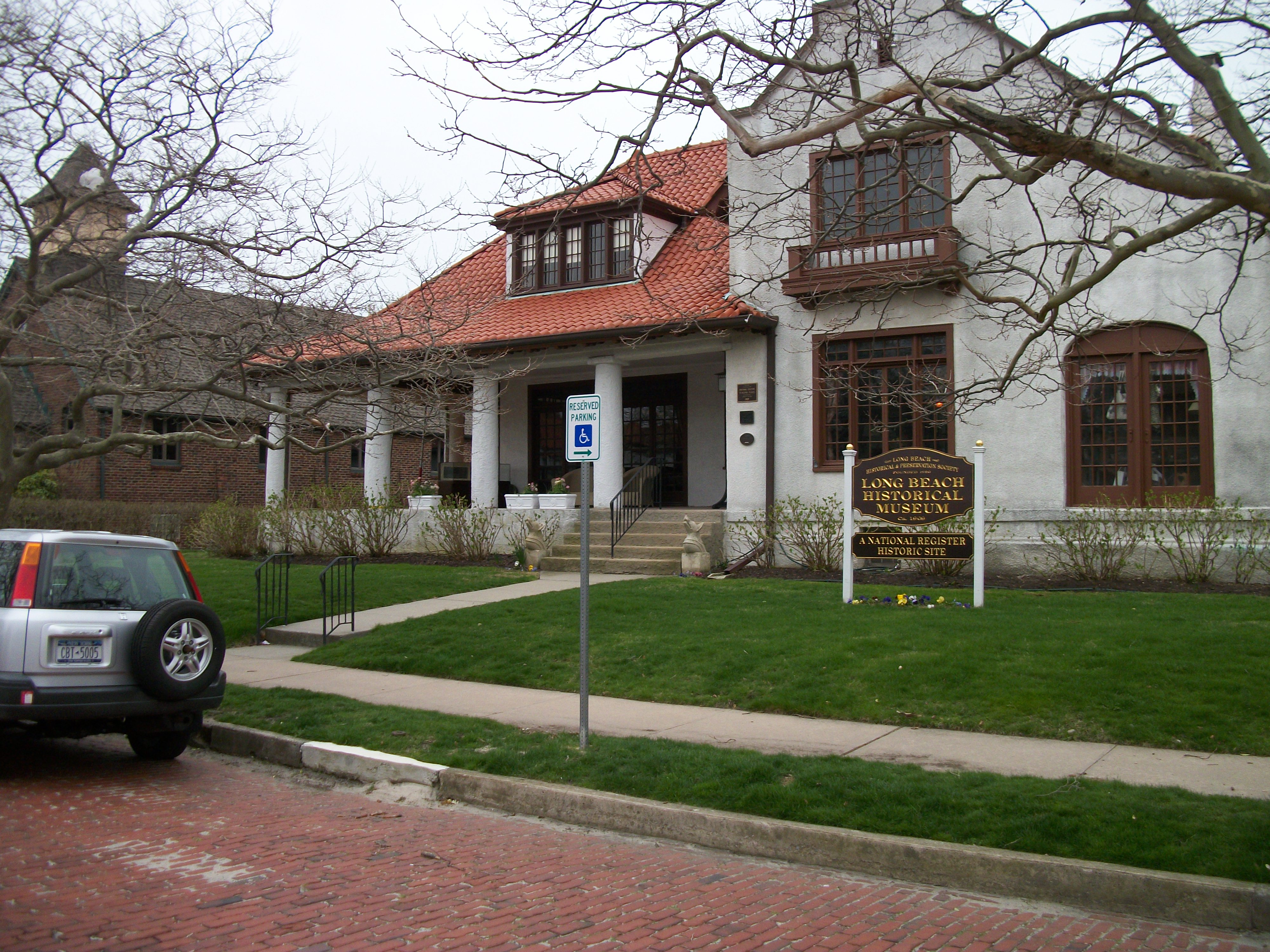
- Long Beach Historical Museum, a historic former private house at 226 West Penn Street.

- Location within New York Location within the United States
- Location: 226 West Penn Street; Long Beach, New York
- Coordinates: 40°35′6.93″N 73°40′15.39″W
- Area: less than one acre
- Built: 1909
- Architect: Elmohar Company
- Architectural style: Bungalow/Craftsman
- NRHP reference No.: 08000932
- Added to NRHP: September 24, 2008

House at 226 West Penn Street, also known as Long Beach Historical Museum, is a historic home located at Long Beach in Nassau County, New York. It was built in 1909 and is a two-story, American Craftsman / bungalow style residence with a stucco exterior and a clay tile hipped roof. It features a large stucco colonnaded wraparound porch supported by eight thick columns. Also on the property is a contributing early 20th century garage. It has housed the Long Beach Historical Museum since 1997.

It was listed on the National Register of Historic Places in 2008.
