= Samuel Vaisberg House =

Historic house in New York, United States

- U.S. National Register of Historic Places
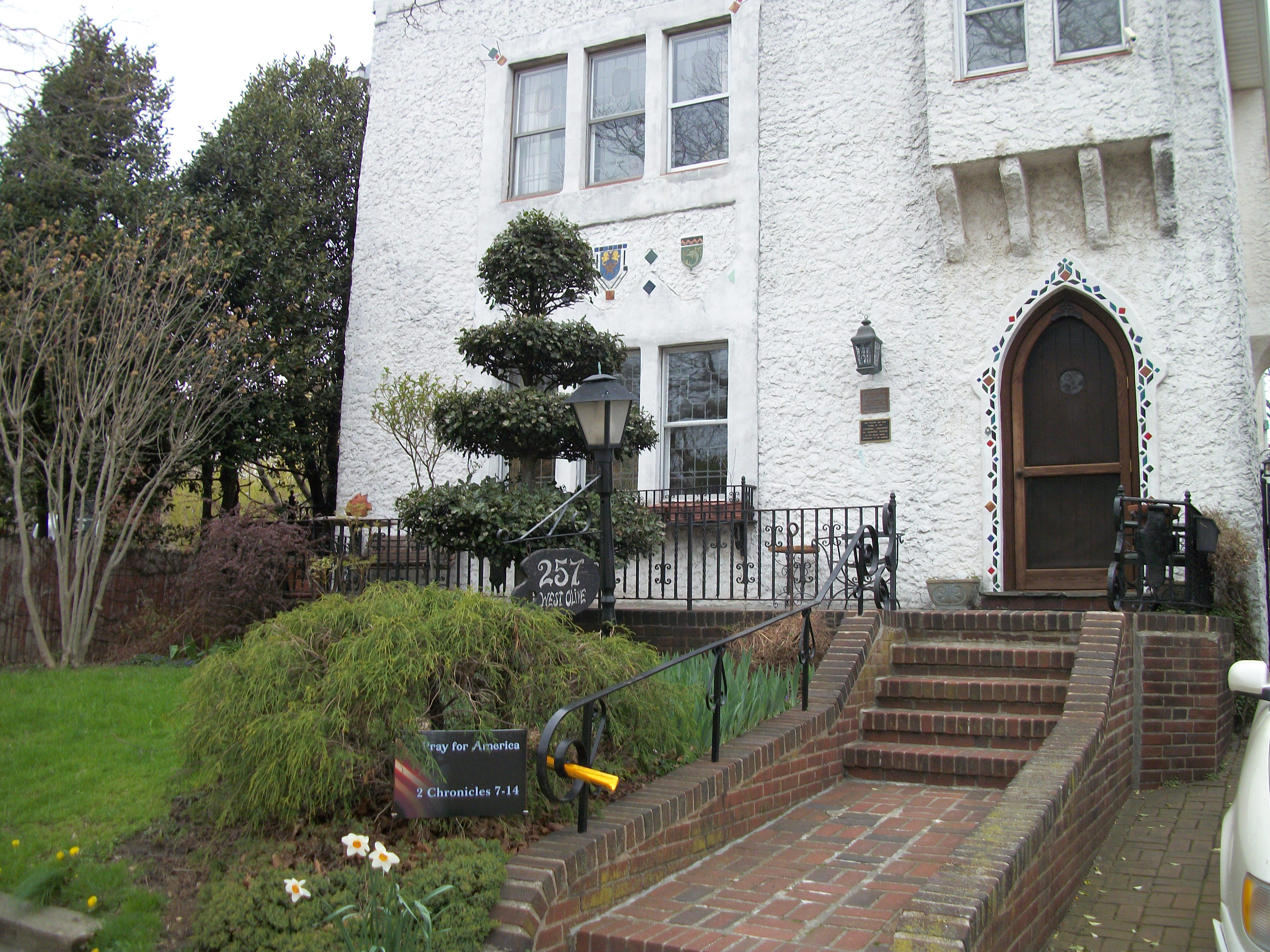
- Samuel Vaisberg House

- Location within New York Location within the United States
- Location: 257 West Olive Street; Long Beach, New York
- Coordinates: 40°35′13″N 73°40′22″W
- Area: less than one acre
- Architect: Dorfmann, D.W.
- Architectural style: Mission/Spanish Revival
- NRHP reference No.: 05001137
- Added to NRHP: October 5, 2005

Samuel Vaisberg House is a historic home located at Long Beach in Nassau County, New York. It was built in 1927 in the boom years before the Great Depression. It is a rectangular, 2 1/2-story, Spanish Revival-style residence with a stucco exterior and a clay tile, hipped roof. It features decorative art glass windows. Also on the property is a stucco garage.

It was listed on the National Register of Historic Places in 2005.
