= Granada Towers =

- U.S. National Register of Historic Places
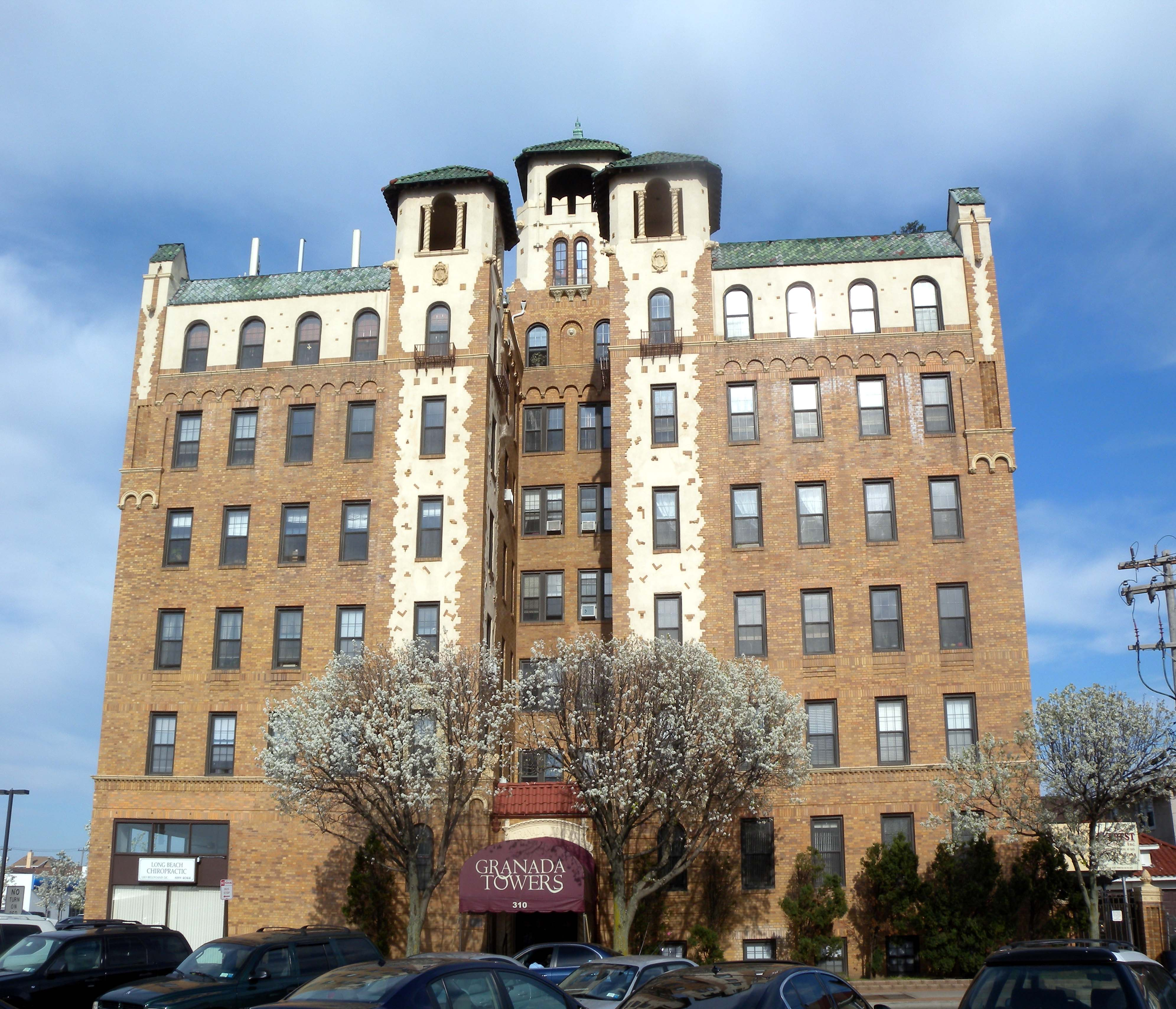
- Granada Towers, April 2009

- Location within New York Location within the United States
- Location: 310 Riverside Blvd., Long Beach, New York
- Coordinates: 40°35′17.5″N 73°39′39.5″W
- Area: less than one acre
- Built: 1929
- Architect: Lang & Rosenberg
- Architectural style: Mission/Spanish Revival
- NRHP reference No.: 84002750
- Added to NRHP: May 31, 1984

Granada Towers is a historic apartment building located at Long Beach in Nassau County, New York. It was designed in 1929 in the Spanish Revival style. It consists of three connected towers, each seven stories tall. It is built of orange-brown brick with terra cotta and stucco trim. The entry has terra cotta pilasters, with spindle shafts and composite capitals.

It was listed on the National Register of Historic Places in 1984.
