= Long Beach Police Department (New York) =

Coordinates: 40°35′21.95″N 73°39′57.76″W

- Seal of the Long Beach Police Department
- Common name: Long Beach Police
- Abbreviation: LBPD

Agency overview
- Formed: 1911

Jurisdictional structure
- Operations jurisdiction: Long Beach, New York, USA
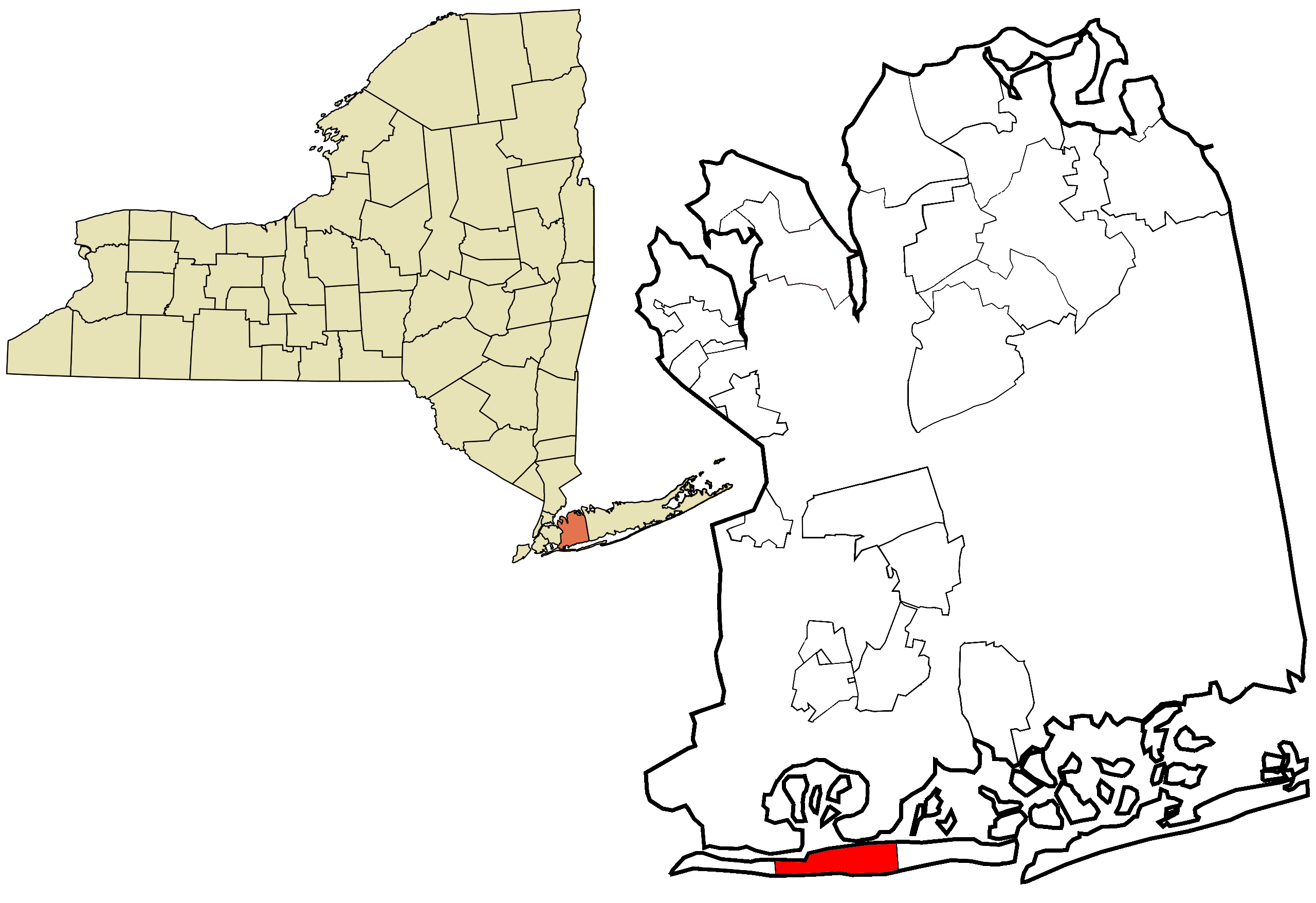
- Map of Long Beach Police Department's jurisdiction
- Area: 3.9 square miles
- Population: 35,029 (2020)
- Legal jurisdiction: Long Beach, New York
- General nature: Local civilian police

Operational structure
- Headquarters: 1 West Chester Street, Long Beach, New York 11561
- Police Officers: 76 (2024)
- Unsworn members: 25 (2024)
- Agency executive: Richard DePalma, Acting Police Commissioner

Website
- www.lbpd.com

The Long Beach Police Department (also known as the Long Beach Police and abbreviated as LBPD) is the primary law enforcement agency serving the City of Long Beach, in Nassau County, New York, United States. It exclusively serves the City of Long Beach.

== History ==
The Long Beach Police Department was established in 1911. The police department originally started with 36 police officers. By the early 1930s, the number of Long Beach officers rose to 58.

The LBPD opened a second precinct, serving the West End neighborhood of the city, in 1923 – one year after the Village of Long Beach re-incorporated as the City of Long Beach. This short-lived precinct was established in light of continued growth in the city. The Second Precinct lasted until the Great Depression, when it was shut down.

In 1931, during the Prohibition era, the Long Beach Police Department was investigated for rum-running operations – smuggling alcohol while such sales were prohibited in the United States. The Chief of the police department, Morris Grossman, was indicted by Federal agents in October of that year on conspiracy charges for having smuggling $10,000,000 (1931 USD) in alcohol over between 1929 and 1931; Grossman was one of nine individuals indicted – seven of the others being subordinates of his in the Long Beach Police Department.

On May 22, 1944, the Long Beach Police Department hired the first two permanent female cops in Nassau County.

In 1975, the Long Beach Police Department considered merging into the Nassau County Police Department. This proposal was backed by the Long Beach PBA, which argued that by merging its police force into Nassau County's, the City of Long Beach could have potentially saved up to $650,000 – and that the proposal could have led to enhanced policing services. Such a merger was ultimately called off, with the Long Beach Police Department remaining operational.

In 1977, the Long Beach Police Department was investigated over possible corruption and political influence.

In the summer of 2007, the LBPD started using two Segway people movers on the boardwalk for patrol. Long Beach police were the first to use Segways on Long Island. The Segway initiative ended abruptly and was never reinstated.

In 2020, LBPD member Alexandra Nielsen became the department's first female to be promoted to the ranks of Sergeant.

In late 2023 and early 2024, the Long Beach Police Department began equipping its officers with police body cameras. In the period between December 2023 and late January 2024, roughly half of the LBPD's officers received cameras.

== Operations ==
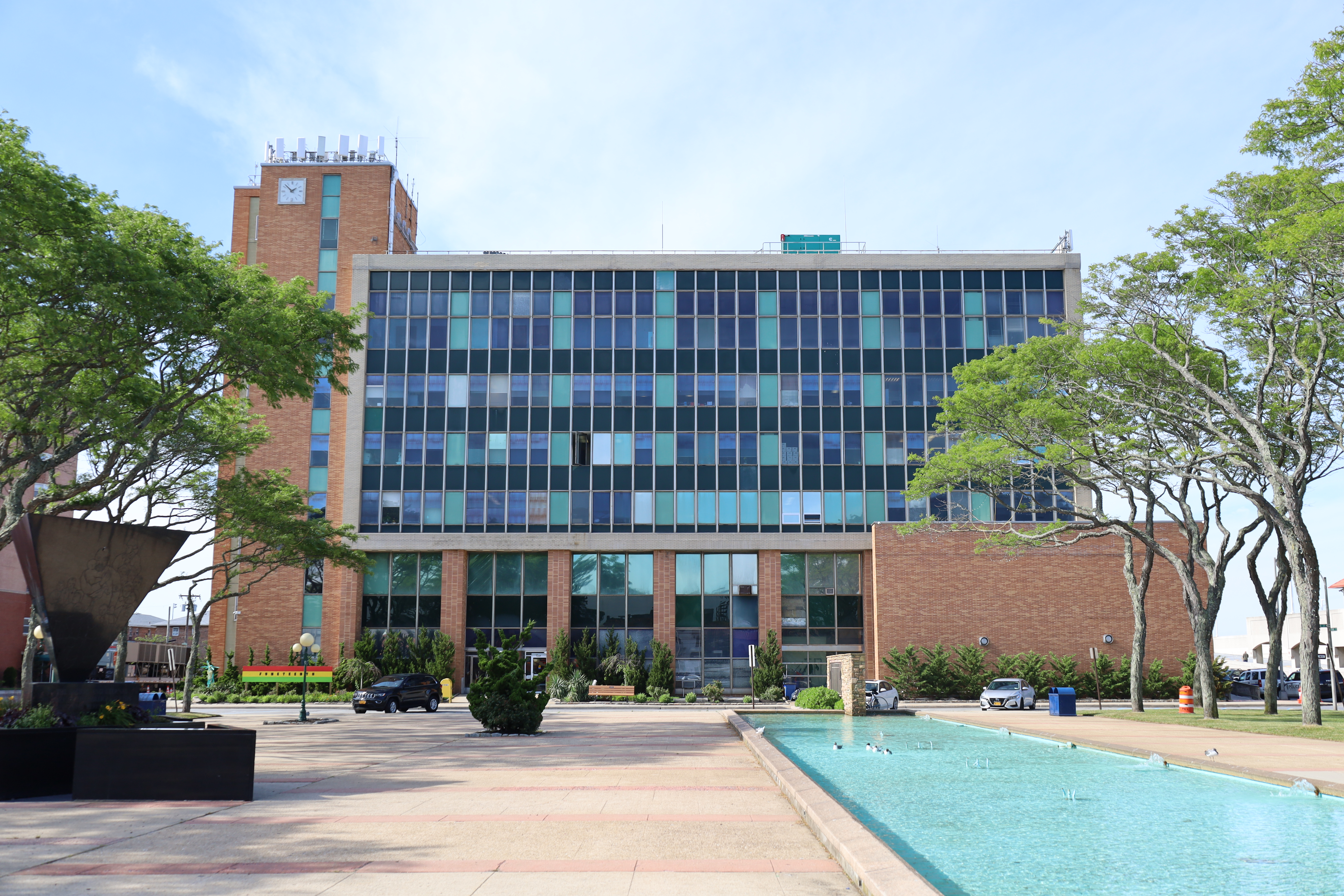
Long Beach City Hall, the department's headquarters, in 2021

The Long Beach Police Department serves the City of Long Beach, with 35,029 residents within its 3.9-square-mile (10 km^{2}) jurisdiction. Commissioner Philip L. Ragona, a decades-long City of Long Beach Police supervisor, lead the Department until Inspector Richard DePalma became the Acting Police Commissioner in December 2020. In addition to the Uniformed Patrol Force, the department has the following specialized units: Detective Division, Narcotics Task Force, Traffic Division, Motorcycle Unit and Identification Division.

The Department employs Bicycle Patrols on the Boardwalk and for major events such as races or bike tours and Four Wheel Drive vehicle's patrol on the beach.

Aside from officer's service weapons, the department also utilizes a wide variety of non-lethal weapons, such as expandable batons, TASERs.

As of 2021, the Long Beach Police Department consisted of 76 sworn police officers and 25 unsworn officers. The agency is headquartered at Long Beach City Hall. During the busy summer months, an average of 25 Special Officers are recruited from criminal justice programs at local colleges to assist with crowd control and enforcement at the Ocean Beach Park and other areas.

As of February 2024, the Acting Commissioner of Police is Richard DePalma, following the resignation of Commissioner Ronald Walsh in January 2024.

== Rank structure ==
The Long Beach Police Department uses the following rank structure:

Title	Insignia
Commissioner	
Inspector	
Deputy Inspector	
Lieutenant	
Sergeant	
Police Officer/Detective	

== Long Beach Auxiliary Police Department ==
The Long Beach Police Department also has an Auxiliary Unit, known as the Long Beach Auxiliary Police Department (LBAPD). Members are certified in CPR/AED, and assist with parade crowd control, bike patrols, and beach and boardwalk patrols – in addition to school patrols. Members carry a baton, handcuffs, pepper spray, a flashlight, and a radio.

During the busy summer months, an average of 25 Special Officers are recruited from criminal justice programs at local colleges to assist with crowd control and enforcement at the Ocean Beach Park and other areas.

== See also ==
- List of law enforcement agencies in New York
- List of Long Island law enforcement agencies
- Long Beach, New York
