= Long Beach, New York =

- City
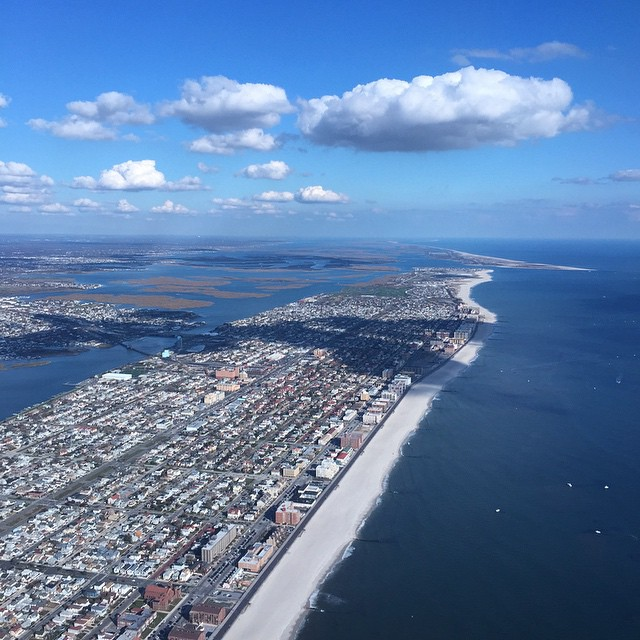
- Aerial photograph of Long Beach and environs on the South Shore of Long Island, as seen from the west-by-southwest

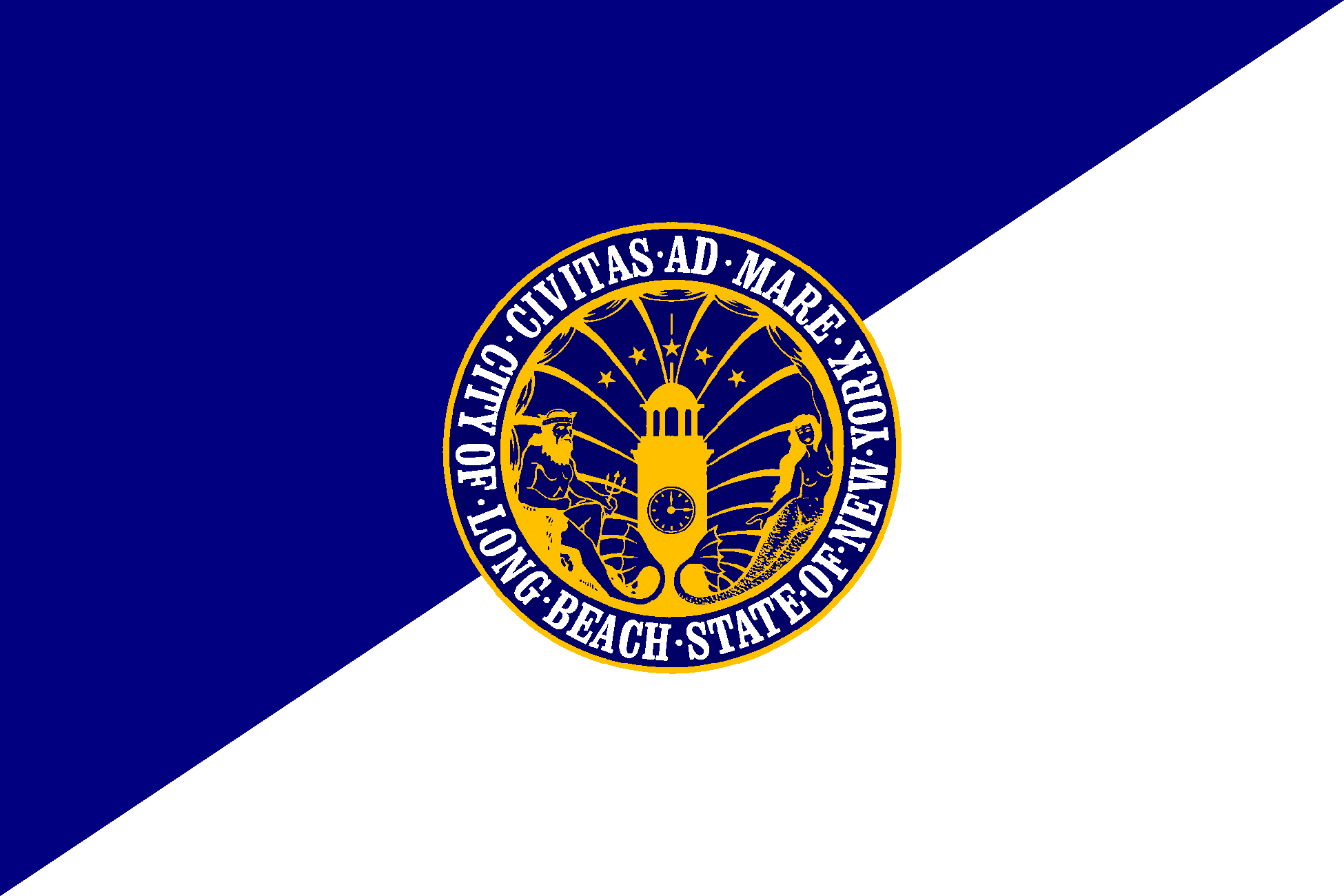
- Flag Seal
- Nickname: The City by the Sea
- Motto(s): Civitas ad mare (City by the Sea)
- Interactive map of Long Beach, New York
- Coordinates: 40°35′17″N 73°41′17″W
- Country: United States
- State: New York
- County: Nassau
- Settled: 1623
- Incorporated Village: 1913
- City of Long Beach: 1922
- Founder: William H. Reynolds

Government
  - Type: Council-Manager
  - City Manager: Daniel Creighton

Area
  - Total: 3.90 sq mi (10.09 km^{2})
  - Land: 2.22 sq mi (5.74 km^{2})
  - Water: 1.68 sq mi (4.34 km^{2})
- Elevation: 0 ft (0 m)

Population (2020)
  - Total: 35,029
  - Density: 15,795.5/sq mi (6,098.69/km^{2})
- 34th densest in US
- Time zone: UTC-5 (EST)
  - Summer (DST): UTC-4 (EDT)
- ZIP code: 11561
- Area codes: 516, 363
- FIPS code: 36-43335
- GNIS feature ID: 0955835
- Website: longbeachny.gov

Long Beach is an oceanfront city in Nassau County, New York, on Long Island. The city rests on a central section of the Long Beach Barrier Island, which is the westernmost of the outer barrier islands off the South Shore of Long Island. The city's population was 35,029 at the 2020 United States census.

The City of Long Beach was incorporated in 1922, and is nicknamed "The City by the Sea" (the Latin form, Civitas ad mare, is the city's motto). Long Beach is bordered by East Atlantic Beach to the west, and Lido Beach to the east, on the Long Beach Barrier Island—which in turn is surrounded by the Reynolds Channel to the north, east and west, and the Atlantic Ocean to the south.

In 2022, Long Beach was named one of the best East Coast towns for a summer getaway by Time Out magazine.

== History ==
=== Pre-settlement ===
The city of Long Beach's first inhabitants were the Algonquian-speaking Lenape, who sold the area to English colonists in 1643. From that time, while the barrier island was used by baymen and farmers for fishing and harvesting salt hay, no one lived there year-round for more than two centuries. The barque Mexico, carrying Irish immigrants to New York, ran aground on a sandbar 200 yards off of Long Beach on January 2, 1837; 115 of its passengers would freeze to death on the deck of the ship.

Austin Corbin, a builder from Brooklyn, was the first to attempt to develop the island as a resort. He formed a partnership with the Long Island Rail Road (LIRR) to finance the New York and Long Beach Railroad Co., which laid track from Lynbrook to Long Beach in 1880. That same year, Corbin opened Long Beach Hotel, a row of 27 cottages along a 1,100-foot (340 m) strip of beach, which he claimed was the world's largest hotel. In its first season, the railroad brought 300,000 visitors to Long Island. By the next spring, tracks had been laid the length of the island, but they were removed in 1894 after repeated washouts from winter storms.

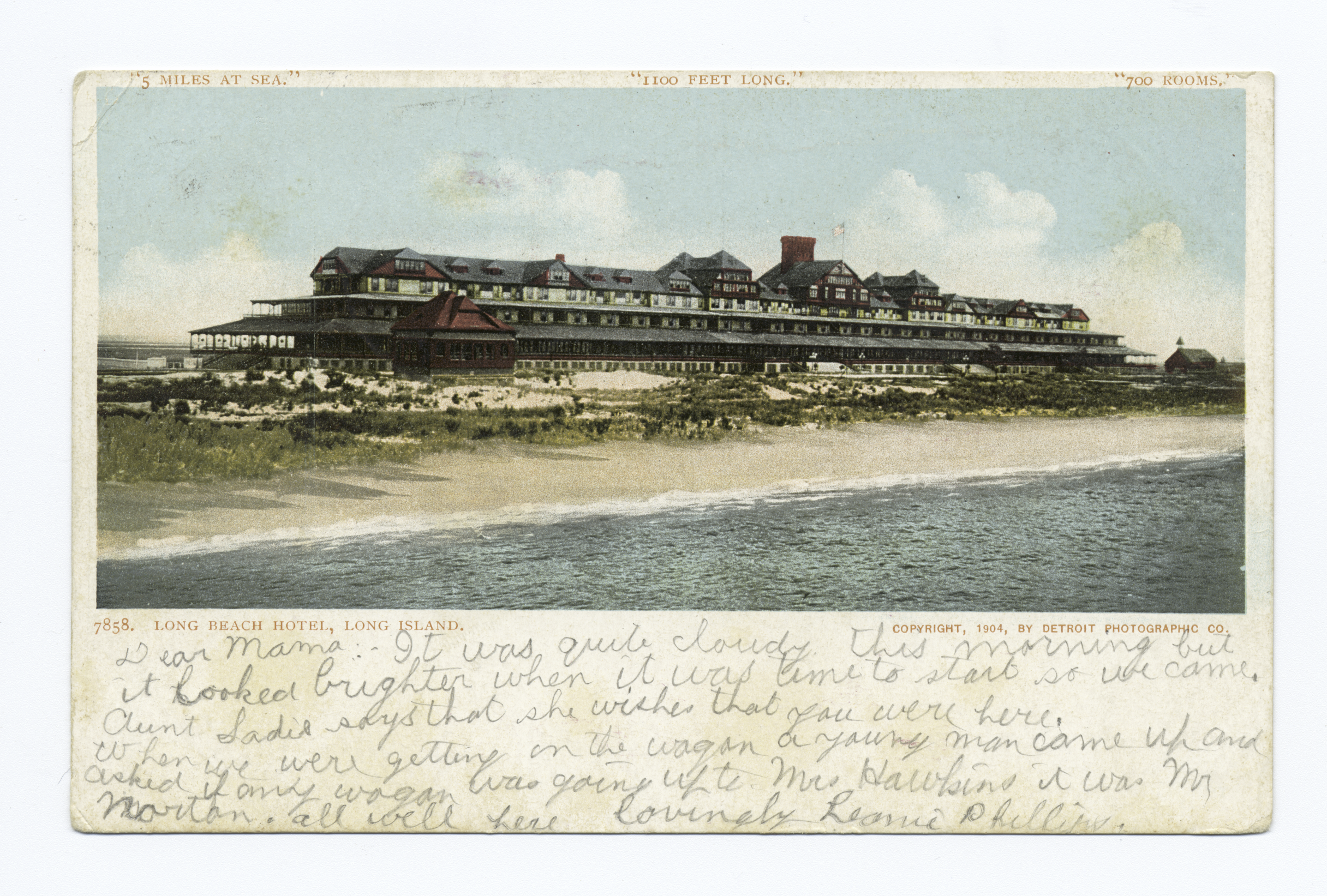
Long Beach Hotel

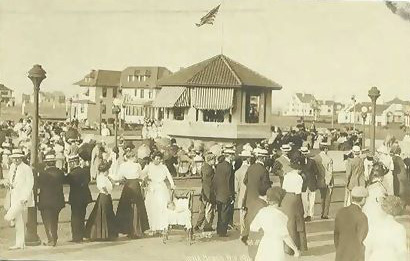
Long Beach boardwalk, c. 1911

Crowded beach, c. 1923

=== 20th century ===
In 1906, William H. Reynolds, a 39-year-old real estate developer and former state senator, became involved in the area. Reynolds had already developed four Brooklyn neighborhoods (Bedford–Stuyvesant, Borough Park, Bensonhurst, and South Brownsville), as well as Coney Island's Dreamland, the world's largest amusement park at the time. Reynolds also owned a theatre and produced plays.

He gathered investors, and acquired the oceanfront from private owners and the rest of the island from the Town of Hempstead in 1907; he planned to build a boardwalk, homes, and hotels. Reynolds had a herd of elephants marched in from Dreamland, ostensibly to help build the Long Beach Boardwalk; he had created an effective publicity stunt. Dredges created a channel 1,000 feet (300 m) wide on the north side of the island to provide access by large steamboats and seaplanes to transport more visitors; the new waterway was named Reynolds Channel. To ensure that Long Beach lived up to his billing it "The Riviera of the East", he required each building to be constructed in an "eclectic Mediterranean style", with white stucco walls and red-clay tile roofs. He built a theatre called Castles by the Sea, with the largest dance floor in the world, for dancers Vernon and Irene Castle.

After Reynolds' corporation went bankrupt in 1918, the restrictions were lifted. The new town attracted wealthy business people and entertainers from New York and Hollywood.

On July 29, 1907, a fire broke out at the Long Beach Hotel and burned it to the ground. Of the 800 guests, eight were injured by jumping from windows, and one woman died. The fire was blamed on defective electric wiring. A church, several cottages, and the bathing pavilion were also destroyed. Trunks belonging to the guests, which had been piled on the sand to form "dressing rooms", were looted by thieves. A dozen waiters and others were apprehended by the police, who recovered $20,000 worth of jewelry and other stolen property.

The community became an incorporated village in 1913. Seeking further autonomy, the growing village re-incorporated – this time as a city – in 1922, effectively separating it completely from the Town of Hempstead.

In 1923, the prohibition agents known simply as Izzy and Moe raided the Nassau Hotel and arrested three men for bootlegging. In 1930, five Long Beach Police officers were charged with offering a bribe to a United States Coast Guard officer to allow liquor to be landed. The police had another problem a year later in the summer of 1931, when a beachcomber found the body of a young woman named Starr Faithfull, who had drowned. She had left behind a suicide note, but others believed she had been murdered, and the circumstances of her death were never resolved. Corruption became rampant in Long Beach by then; in 1922, the state Legislature designated Long Beach a city, and William H. Reynolds was elected the first mayor. Soon afterward, Reynolds was indicted on charges of misappropriating funds. When he was found guilty, the clock in the tower at city hall was stopped in protest. When a judge released Reynolds from jail later that year on appeal, almost the entire population turned out to greet him, and the clock was turned back on.

On November 15, 1939, Mayor Louis F. Edwards was fatally shot by a police officer in front of his home. Officer Alvin Dooley, a member of the police motorcycle squad and the mayor's own security detail, killed Edwards after losing his bid for PBA president to a candidate the mayor supported. Jackson Boulevard was later renamed Edwards Boulevard in honor of the late mayor. After the murder, the city residents passed legislation to adopt a city manager system, which still exists to this day. The city manager is hired by and reports to the City Council.

In the 1940s, José Ferrer, Zero Mostel, Mae West, and other famous actors performed at local theaters. John Barrymore, Humphrey Bogart, Clara Bow, James Cagney, Cab Calloway, Jack Dempsey, Lillian Roth, Rudolph Valentino, and Florenz Ziegfeld lived in Long Beach for decades.

By the 1940s and 1950s, with the advent of cheap air travel attracting tourists to more distant places, and air-conditioning to provide year-round comfort, Long Beach had become primarily a bedroom community for commuters to New York City. It still attracted many summer visitors into the 1970s. The rundown boardwalk hotels were used for temporary housing for welfare recipients and the elderly until a scandal around 1970 led to many of the homes losing their licenses. At that time, government agencies were also "warehousing" in such hotels many patients released from larger mental hospitals. They were supposed to be cared for in small-scale community centers. The 2.2-mile (3.5 km) boardwalk had a small amusement park at the foot of Edwards Boulevard until the 1980s. In the late 1960s, the boardwalk and amusement park area was a magnet for youth from around Long Island, until a police crackdown on drug trafficking ended that. A few businesses remained on the boardwalk, attracting bicyclists, joggers, walkers, and people-watchers.

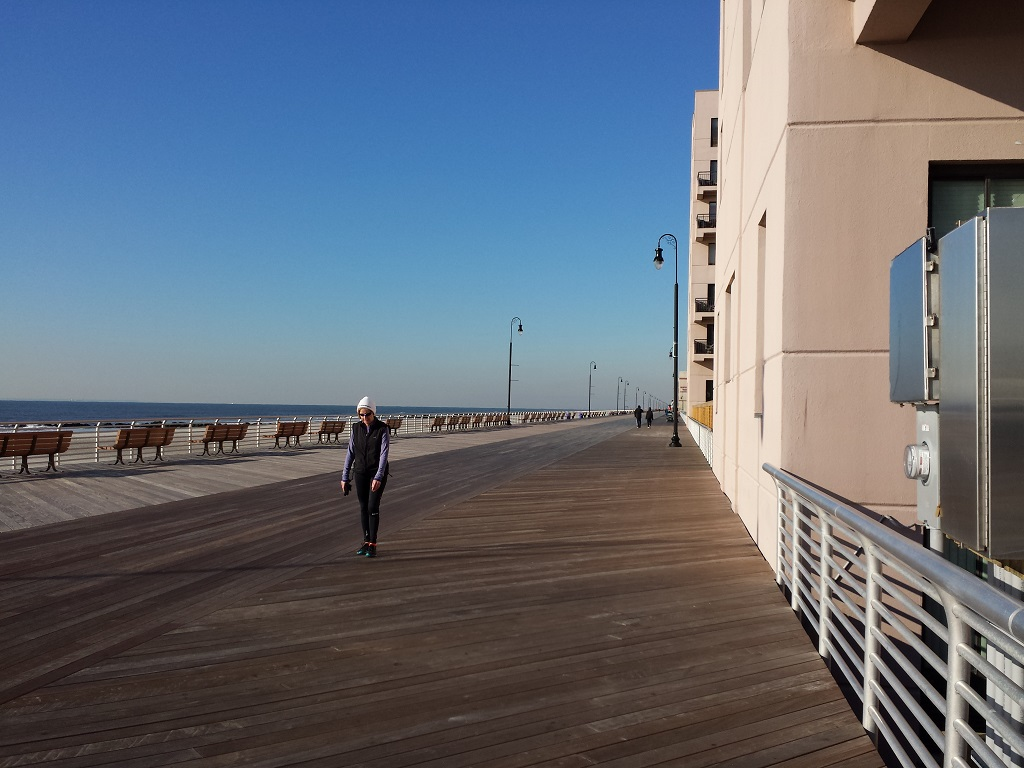
The newly rebuilt boardwalk in November 2013.

Beginning in the 1980s and accelerating in the 1990s, Long Beach began an urban renewal, with new housing, new businesses, and other improvements. Today, the city is again a popular bedroom community, for people working in New York who want the quiet beach atmosphere. With summer come local youths and college students and young adults who rent bungalows on the West End; they frequent the local bars and clubs along West Beech Street. Just behind the boardwalk near the center of the city, however, vacant lots now occupy several blocks that once housed hotels, bathhouses, and the amusement park. Because attempts to attract development (including, at one time, Atlantic City-style casinos) to this potential "superblock" have not yet borne fruit, the lots constitute the city's largest portion of unused land.

=== 21st century ===
On October 29, 2012, Hurricane Sandy struck Long Beach. As a result of flooding, hundreds of vehicles were destroyed and houses suffered various levels of damage. The estimated cost of all the damage was over $250 million. The city was without power and running water for two weeks after the storm. The boardwalk at Ocean Beach Park was also destroyed during the storm. The city began rebuilding the boardwalk with grants from FEMA and the State of New York. The first two-block section of the new Long Beach boardwalk reopened on July 26, 2013, and the entire boardwalk opened on October 25, 2013. The final costs of rebuilding the boardwalk were $44 million, of which ca. $39 million were FEMA grants and the final $4.4 million were reimbursed by the state.

== Geography ==
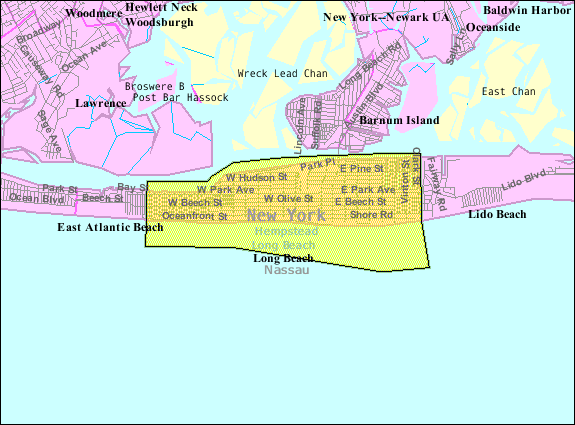
U.S. Census map of Long Beach

According to the United States Census Bureau, the city has a total area of 3.90 square miles (10.1 km^{2}). Of its total area, 2.22 square miles (5.7 km^{2}) is land, and the rest is water.

=== Long Beach Barrier Island ===
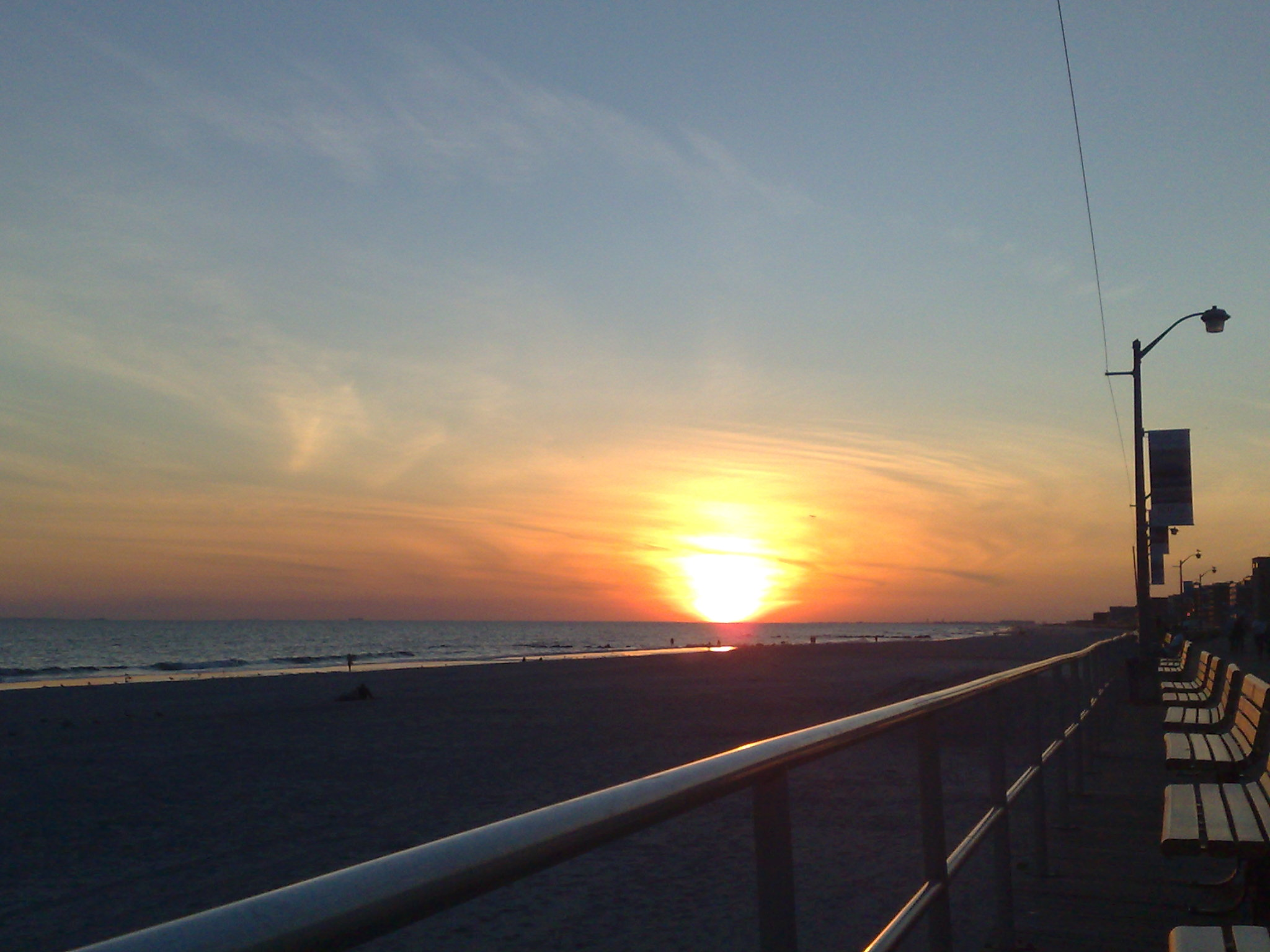
Sunset at Long Beach

The city rests on a barrier island of the South Shore of Long Island. It shares the island with East Atlantic Beach, Atlantic Beach to the west and Lido Beach and Point Lookout to the east.

=== Climate ===
Long Beach has a humid subtropical climate (Cfa) under the Köppen climate classification, with humid hot summers and cool winters. It is one of the northernmost locations in this climate zone, allowing for the growth of warmer climate plants like mimosa, crape myrtle, southern magnolia, and sweetgum. It is in plant hardiness zone 7b. Precipitation is evenly distributed year-round, mostly in the form of rain although snowfall occurs each winter. Long Beach is vulnerable to tropical cyclones. Its climate is tempered by the influence of the Atlantic Ocean.

Climate data for Long Beach, New York
Month	Jan	Feb	Mar	Apr	May	Jun	Jul	Aug	Sep	Oct	Nov	Dec	Year
Record high °F (°C)	71 (22)	71 (22)	85 (29)	92 (33)	97 (36)	100 (38)	104 (40)	101 (38)	98 (37)	90 (32)	83 (28)	75 (24)	104 (40)
Mean daily maximum °F (°C)	39 (4)	42 (6)	49 (9)	59 (15)	69 (21)	78 (26)	83 (28)	82 (28)	75 (24)	65 (18)	54 (12)	44 (7)	62 (17)
Mean daily minimum °F (°C)	26 (−3)	28 (−2)	34 (1)	44 (7)	53 (12)	63 (17)	69 (21)	68 (20)	61 (16)	50 (10)	41 (5)	32 (0)	47 (9)
Record low °F (°C)	−7 (−22)	−4 (−20)	7 (−14)	20 (−7)	34 (1)	45 (7)	48 (9)	46 (8)	41 (5)	30 (−1)	15 (−9)	−1 (−18)	−7 (−22)

=== Cityscape ===
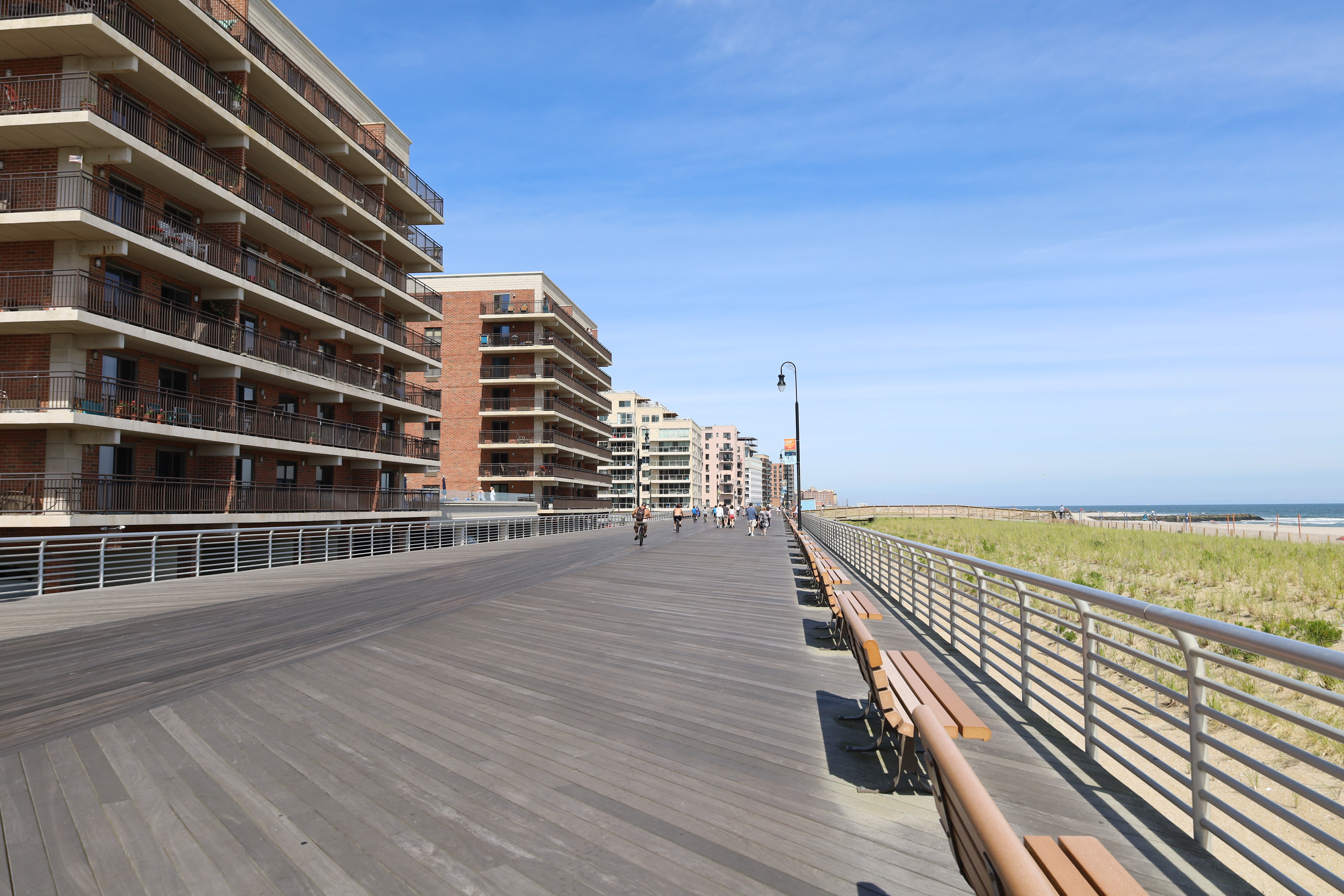
Buildings on the boardwalk in 2021

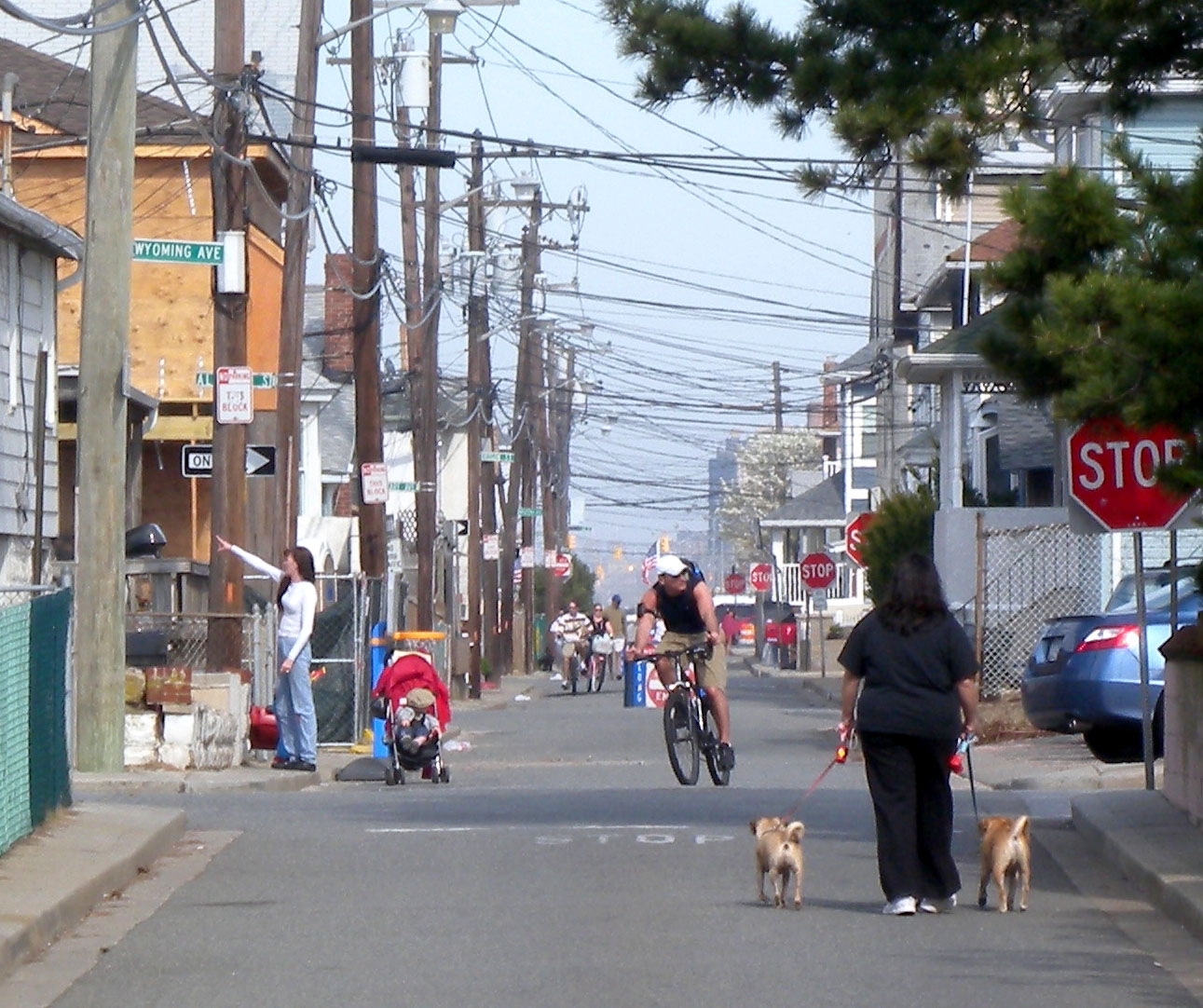
Oceanview Avenue, West End

Unlike most communities near New York City, Long Beach is a high-density community. Fewer than 40% of the homes are detached houses, and the city ranks as the 35th-densest community in the United States – ahead of larger cities like Chicago, Miami, and Philadelphia. The city is less than 1 mile (1.6 km) wide from ocean to bay and about 3.5 miles (5.6 km) long. The city is divided into the West End, home to many small bungalow and some large houses, and the East End. West of New York Avenue, the barrier island is less than 0.5 miles (800 m) wide and West Beech Street is the main east/west commercial street.

East of New York Avenue, the island is wider between the bay and ocean and is home to larger more expansive family houses. There is the city's boardwalk, which begins at New York Avenue and ends at Neptune Boulevard. Along the boardwalk are many apartment buildings and condos. The main commercial strip is Park Avenue, which narrows into a small residential strip west of New York Avenue. The beach itself is legally referred to as Ocean Beach Park.

=== City divisions and districts ===
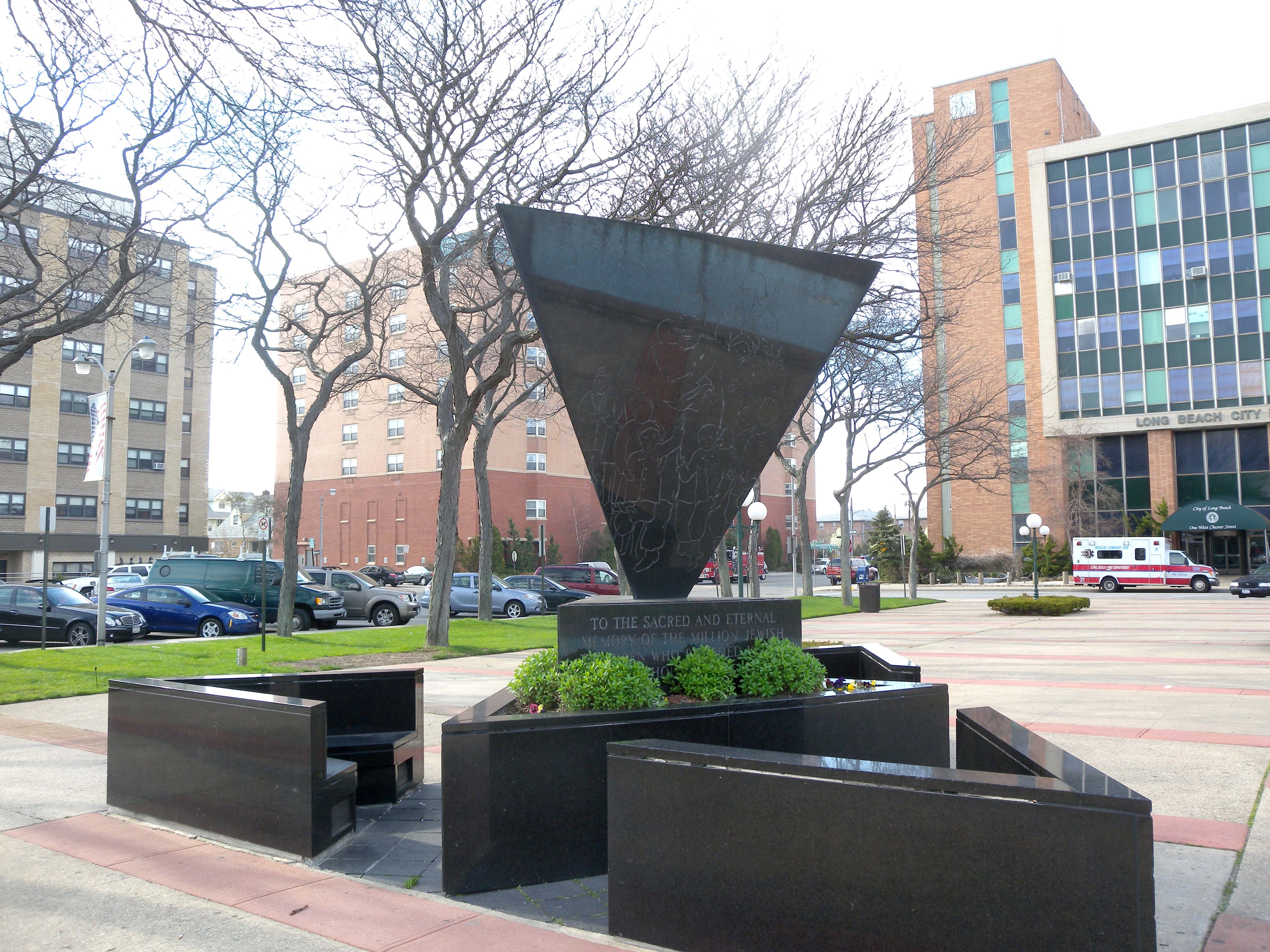
Kennedy Plaza in the Central District.

The city of Long Beach contains the following neighborhoods:

- Central District – The area between Magnolia Boulevard and Monroe Boulevard, Long Beach's City Hall is located in this area as well as the Martin Luther King Center and Emergency Department at Long Beach.
- The East End – The district between Monroe Boulevard and Maple Boulevard.
- The President Streets – The area comprising 9 north–south avenues of which 5 are named after former U.S. presidents, with the 4 exceptions of Atlantic, Belmont, and Mitchell Avenues, and Pacific Boulevard; Pacific Boulevard connects directly from Park Avenue to East Broadway, a parallel road to the south.
- The West End – The district between New York Avenue and East Atlantic Beach. This area is home to many small bungalows and large houses close to one other, along small narrow streets. These streets, named after U.S. states, run from the beach to the bay, until they meet East Atlantic Beach at Westholme Ave.

Neighborhoods and enclaves

- The Walks – An area comprising extremely narrow sidewalks between houses. Each walk is named after a month.
- North Park – The area north of Park Avenue, between the LIRR Station and Monroe.
- The Canals – The area comprising several streets running north–south, with 4 parallel canals originating from Reynolds Channel. The canals begin on Forrester Street and end on Curley Street, each canal except for Bob Jones Canal is traversed by a short bridge carrying East Pine Street.
- Kennedy Plaza – An area in the Central District, at the intersection of National Boulevard and West Chester Street.
- Westholme – The neighborhood between New York Avenue and Magnolia Boulevard.

=== National Register of Historic Places ===
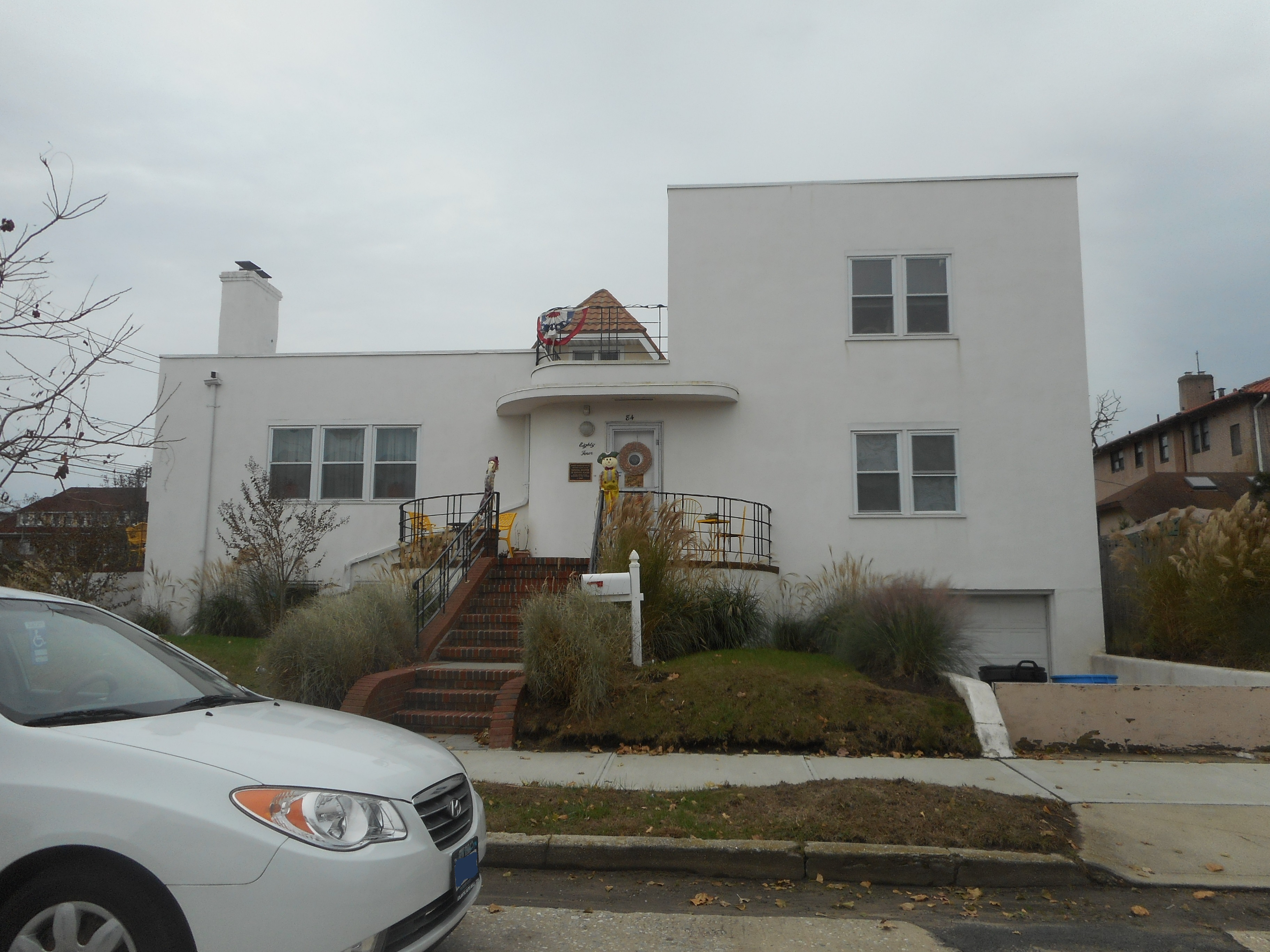
Barkin House

Multiple sites in Long Beach are listed on the National Register of Historic Places, including:

- Barkin House
- Cobble Villa
- Granada Towers
- House at 226 West Penn Street
- Pauline Felix House
- Samuel Vaisberg House
- United States Post Office

=== Landmarks and historic districts ===
The city of Long Beach contains the following landmarks and historic district:

- 9/11 Memorial
- Holocaust Memorial at Kennedy Plaza
- John F. Kennedy Memorial
- Red Brick District

=== Museums and community centers ===
- House at 226 West Penn Street (also known as Long Beach Historical & Preservation Society Museum)
- Martin Luther King Community Center

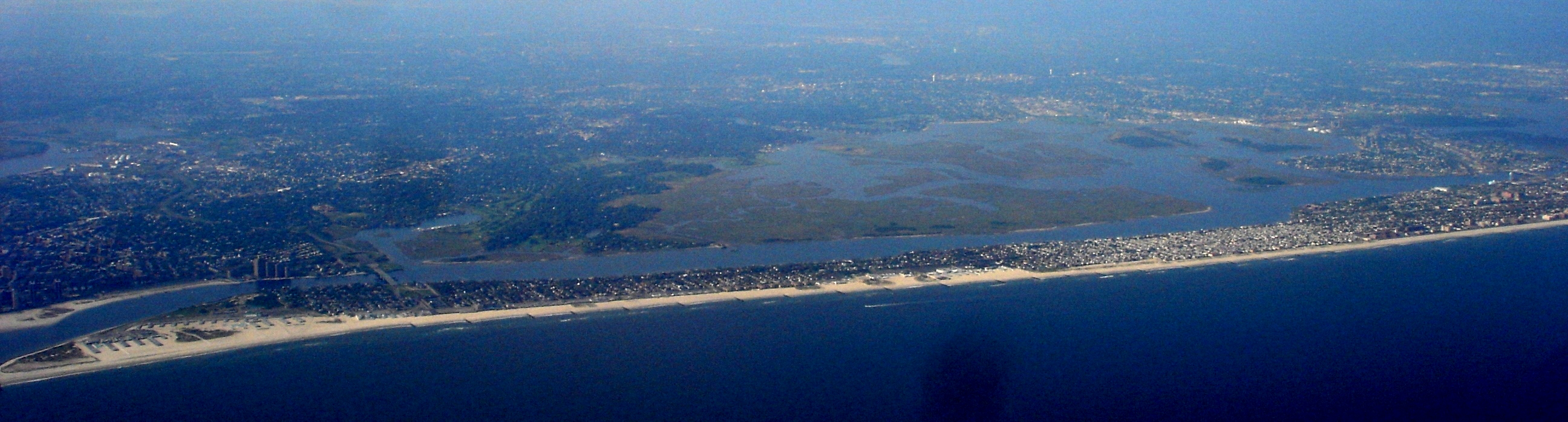
Panorama of Long Beach

== Demographics ==
Historical population
Census	Pop.	Note	%±
1920	282		—
1930	5,817		1,962.8%
1940	9,036		55.3%
1950	15,586		72.5%
1960	26,473		69.9%
1970	33,127		25.1%
1980	34,073		2.9%
1990	33,510		−1.7%
2000	35,462		5.8%
2010	33,275		−6.2%
2020	35,029		5.3%
U.S. Decennial Census

=== Racial and ethnic composition ===
Long Beach city, New York – Racial and ethnic composition Note: the US Census treats Hispanic/Latino as an ethnic category. This table excludes Latinos from the racial categories and assigns them to a separate category. Hispanics/Latinos may be of any race.
Race / Ethnicity (NH = Non-Hispanic)	Pop 2000	Pop 2010	Pop 2020	% 2000	% 2010	% 2020
White alone (NH)	27,328	25,117	25,531	77.06%	75.48%	72.89%
Black or African American alone (NH)	2,071	1,958	1,820	5.84%	5.88%	5.20%
Native American or Alaska Native alone (NH)	62	42	42	0.17%	0.13%	0.12%
Asian alone (NH)	814	881	1,107	2.30%	2.65%	3.16%
Native Hawaiian or Pacific Islander alone (NH)	26	12	21	0.07%	0.04%	0.06%
Other race alone (NH)	171	172	273	0.48%	0.52%	0.78%
Mixed race or Multiracial (NH)	450	402	865	1.27%	1.21%	2.47%
Hispanic or Latino (any race)	4,540	4,691	5,370	12.80%	14.10%	15.33%
Total	35,462	33,275	35,029	100.00%	100.00%	100.00%

The 2015–2019 American Community Survey estimated the racial and ethnic makeup of the city of Long Beach was 71.9% non-Hispanic white, 6.2% Black or African American, 0.2% American Indian or Alaska Native, 2.7% Asian, 2.8% two or more races, and 16.3% Hispanic and Latin American of any race. Out of the total population, 52.2% were female and 13.4% of residents were foreign-born.

=== 2020 census ===
As of the 2020 census, Long Beach had a population of 35,029. The median age was 44.6 years. 15.1% of residents were under the age of 18 and 20.7% of residents were 65 years of age or older. For every 100 females there were 92.2 males, and for every 100 females age 18 and over there were 89.1 males age 18 and over.

100.0% of residents lived in urban areas, while 0.0% lived in rural areas.

There were 15,360 households in Long Beach, of which 20.2% had children under the age of 18 living in them. Of all households, 36.3% were married-couple households, 22.2% were households with a male householder and no spouse or partner present, and 33.7% were households with a female householder and no spouse or partner present. About 38.0% of all households were made up of individuals and 14.7% had someone living alone who was 65 years of age or older.

There were 16,771 housing units, of which 8.4% were vacant. The homeowner vacancy rate was 0.8% and the rental vacancy rate was 4.4%.

Racial composition as of the 2020 census
Race	Number	Percent
White	26,610	76.0%
Black or African American	1,958	5.6%
American Indian and Alaska Native	110	0.3%
Asian	1,124	3.2%
Native Hawaiian and Other Pacific Islander	26	0.1%
Some other race	2,546	7.3%
Two or more races	2,655	7.6%
Hispanic or Latino (of any race)	5,370	15.3%

=== 2010 census ===
The 2010 census reported 33,275 people residing in the city. The population density was 15,022 inhabitants per square mile (5,800/km^{2}).

=== 2000 census ===
At the census of 2000, there were 35,462 people, 14,923 households, and 8,103 families residing in the city. The population density was 16,594.9 inhabitants per square mile (6,407.3/km^{2}). There were 16,128 housing units at an average density of 7,547.3 per square mile (2,914.0/km^{2}). If only residential area is counted, the population density rises to 17,341 per square mile (44,913.19/km^{2}).

The racial makeup of the city was 84.20% White, 6.18% African American, 0.21% Native American, 2.32% Asian, 0.08% Pacific Islander, 4.75% from other races, and 2.26% from two or more races. Hispanic or Latino of any race were 12.80% of the population.

Of the 14,923 households, 21.6% had children under the age of 18 living with them, 40.0% were married couples living together, 10.8% had a female householder with no husband present, and 45.7% were non-families. 36.7% of all households were made up of individuals, and 10.7% had someone living alone who was 65 years of age or older. The average household size was 2.26 and the average family size was 3.02.

The population was spread out, with 18.5% under the age of 18, 6.6% from 18 to 24, 34.4% from 25 to 44, 23.8% from 45 to 64, and 16.7% who were 65 years of age or older. The median age was 40 years. For every 100 females, there were 92.7 males. For every 100 females age 18 and over, there were 89.6 males. The median income for a household in the city was $56,289, and the median income for a family was $68,222. Males had a median income of $50,995 versus $40,739 for females. The per capita income for the city was $31,069. About 6.3% of families and 9.4% of the population were below the poverty line, including 13.2% of those under age 18 and 10.7% of those age 65 or over.

=== 2015–2019 American Community Survey ===
From 2015 to 2019, the American Community Survey estimated there were an average of 2.31 persons per household. The median household income was $97,022, the per capita income was $53,579, and 6.7% of the population lived at or below the poverty line.

=== Religion ===
According to Sperling's BestPlaces, 67.7% of the population of Long Beach were religious as of 2021. The majority of the religious population are Christian and the Catholic Church is the largest single denomination. The second largest Christian group is Protestantism and the single largest Protestant denomination as of 2021 was Lutheranism. The third largest religion practiced in the city is Judaism, followed by Islam. Eastern faiths including Hinduism and Buddhism are also prevalent in the city, while the remainder of the population is irreligious or atheist.

=== Crime ===
In March 2016, sixteen members of the Latin Kings gang were arrested on charges of trafficking narcotics, including cocaine, crack, "molly", and illegal marijuana. In 2022, five men from Long Beach and Hempstead were arrested in Westbury in a gang-related shooting.

== Government ==
Presidential election results in Long Beach
Year	Democratic		Republican		Others	
2024	9,394	52.8%	8,249	46.4%	136	0.8%
2020	10,552	58.4%	7,223	40.0%	285	1.6%
2016	8,843	56.1%	6,255	39.7%	670	4.2%

=== City government ===
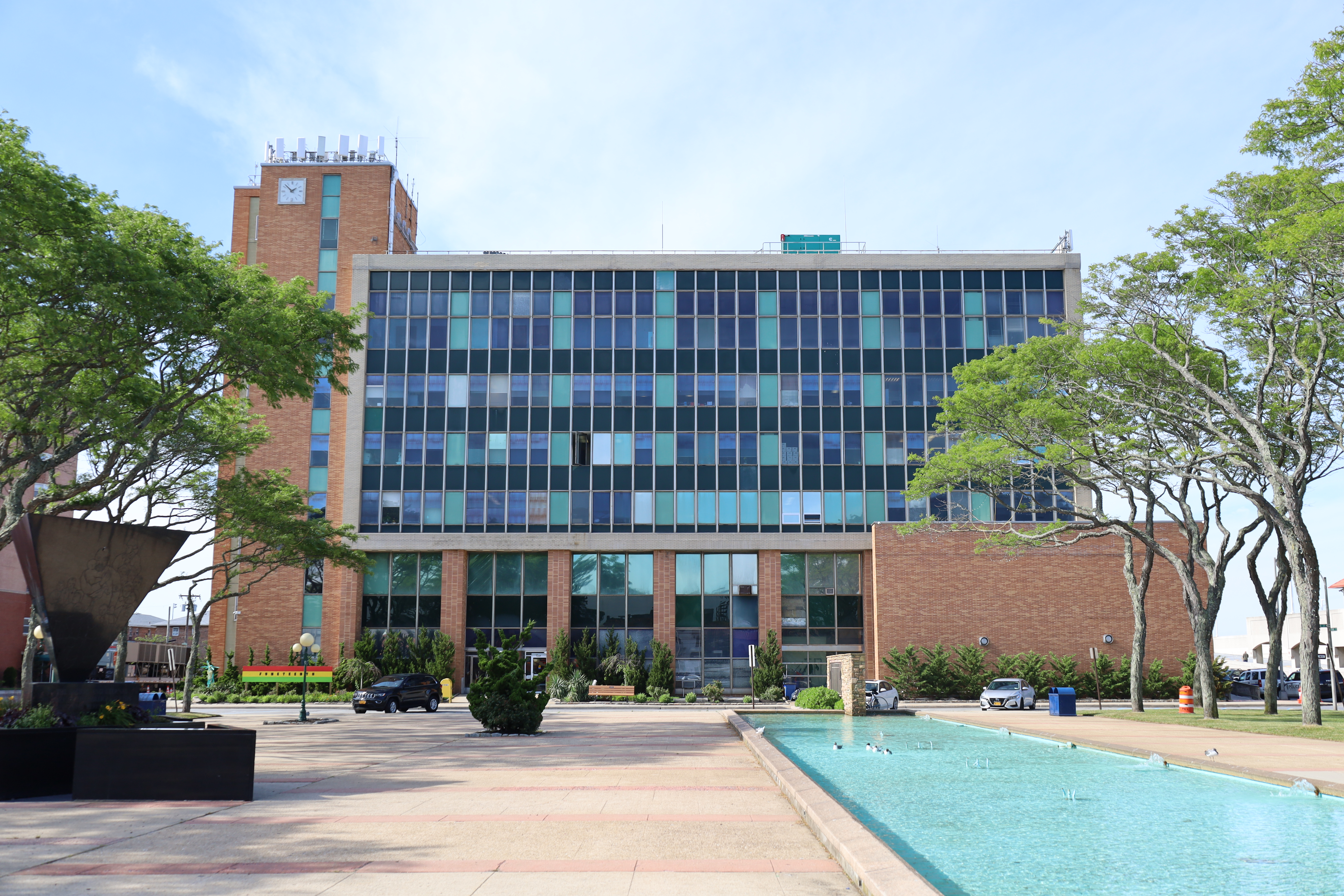
Long Beach City Hall in 2021

==== City manager ====
The current City Manager (2024) is Dan Creighton. He was preceded by:

- 2023 – Ron Walsh, Acting (concurrently Long Beach Police Commissioner)
- 2020 – 2022 Donna Gayden
- 2019 – 2020 Rob Agostisi, Acting (former chief legal counsel)
- 2012 – 2018 Jack Schnirman

==== City council ====
The Long Beach City Council consists of five elected officials who are, for the first time since 1971, all Republicans.

As of February 2026, the city council members are:

- Brendan Finn, President (R)
- Chris Fiumara, Vice President (R)
- Michael Reinhart (R)
- George Ennis (R)
- Tracey Johnson (R)

=== Public safety and emergency services ===
The city has a comprehensive emergency services structure consisting of multiple organizations, including the Long Beach Police Department, Long Beach Fire Department, Long Beach Lifeguards, Animal Control and Emergency Medical Services (LBFD), Long Beach Auxiliary Police Department.

=== Parks and recreation ===
The City of Long Beach has an extensive parks and recreation program led by Joseph Brand II. Within the offerings include, but are not limited to the Ice Arena, Summer Camps, Pool, Races and is most well known for its Ocean Beach Park. Long Beach's Ocean Beach Park (OBP) is managed under the supervision of Nichole Landry.

== Education ==
=== Public schools ===
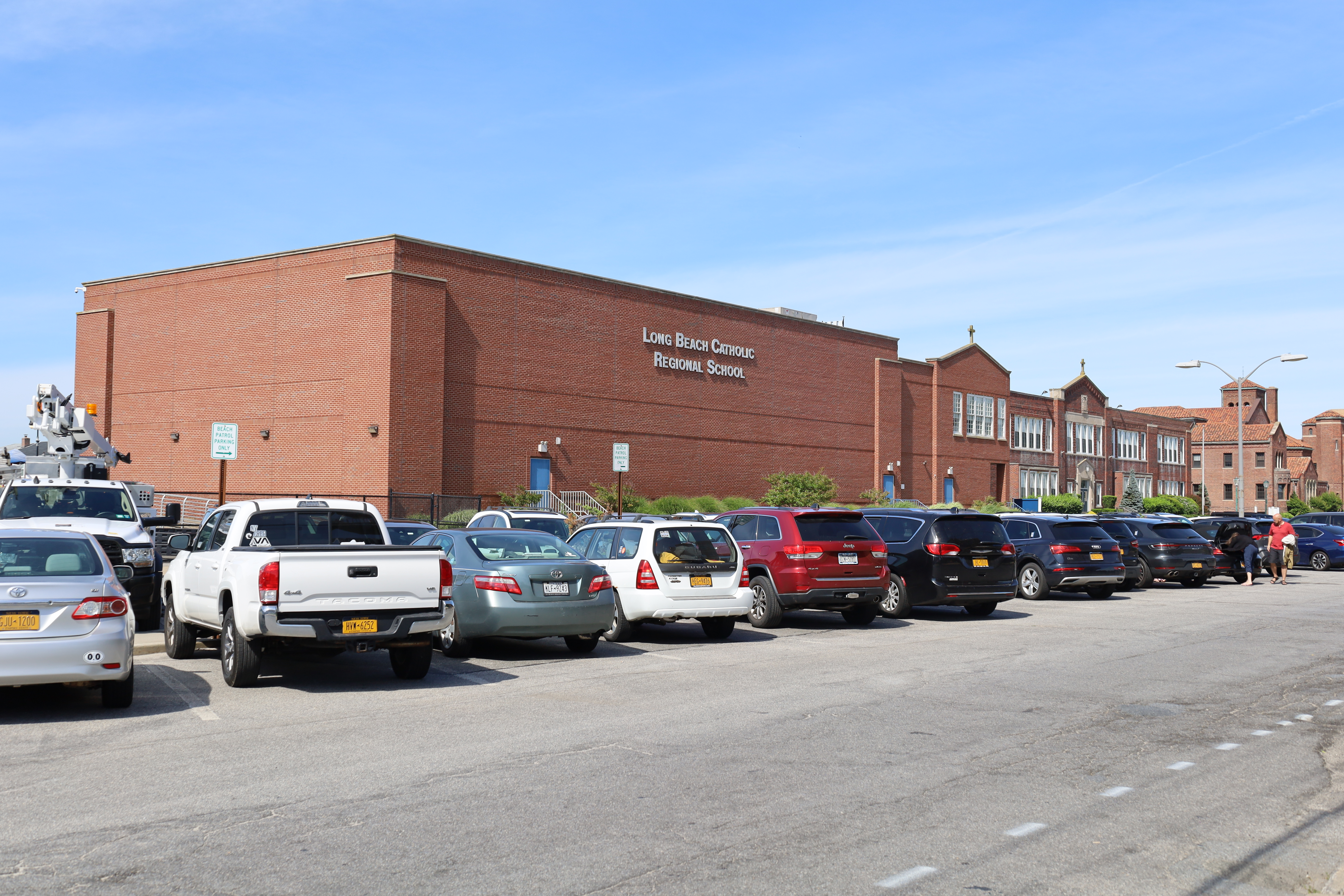
Catholic Regional School

The Long Beach City School District serves the city of Long Beach and parts of the Town of Hempstead, with one primary high school, one middle school, one prekindergarten, and four elementary schools. They also operate an "alternative" high school at the NIKE missile site on a campus shared with the district's transportation services.

The schools of Long Beach City School District are:

- Long Beach Pre-Kindergarten
- West Elementary School
- East Elementary School
- Lido Elementary School
- Lindell Elementary School
- Long Beach Middle School
- Long Beach High School
- Harriet Eisman Community School

=== Private schools ===
- Long Beach Catholic Regional School
- Mesivta of Long Beach

=== Post-secondary education ===
- Rabbinical College of Long Island

=== Public libraries ===
The Long Beach Public Library serves greater Long Beach with the main library downtown and two branch libraries at Point Lookout and the West End.

== Transportation ==
=== Buses and trolleys ===
Long Beach Bus operates a 24-hour municipal bus service with five routes, including three routes serving the city, one overnight circulator route, and one route extending service to Lido Beach and Point Lookout. Long Beach Bus also operates two seasonal trolley routes, East Loop and West Loop.

Nassau Inter-County Express (NICE) has two bus routes that originate in Long Beach. The n15 and n33 travel to Roosevelt Field and Far Rockaway, via Rockville Centre and Atlantic Beach, respectively. The n33 does not provide service wholly within Long Beach.

=== Railroad ===
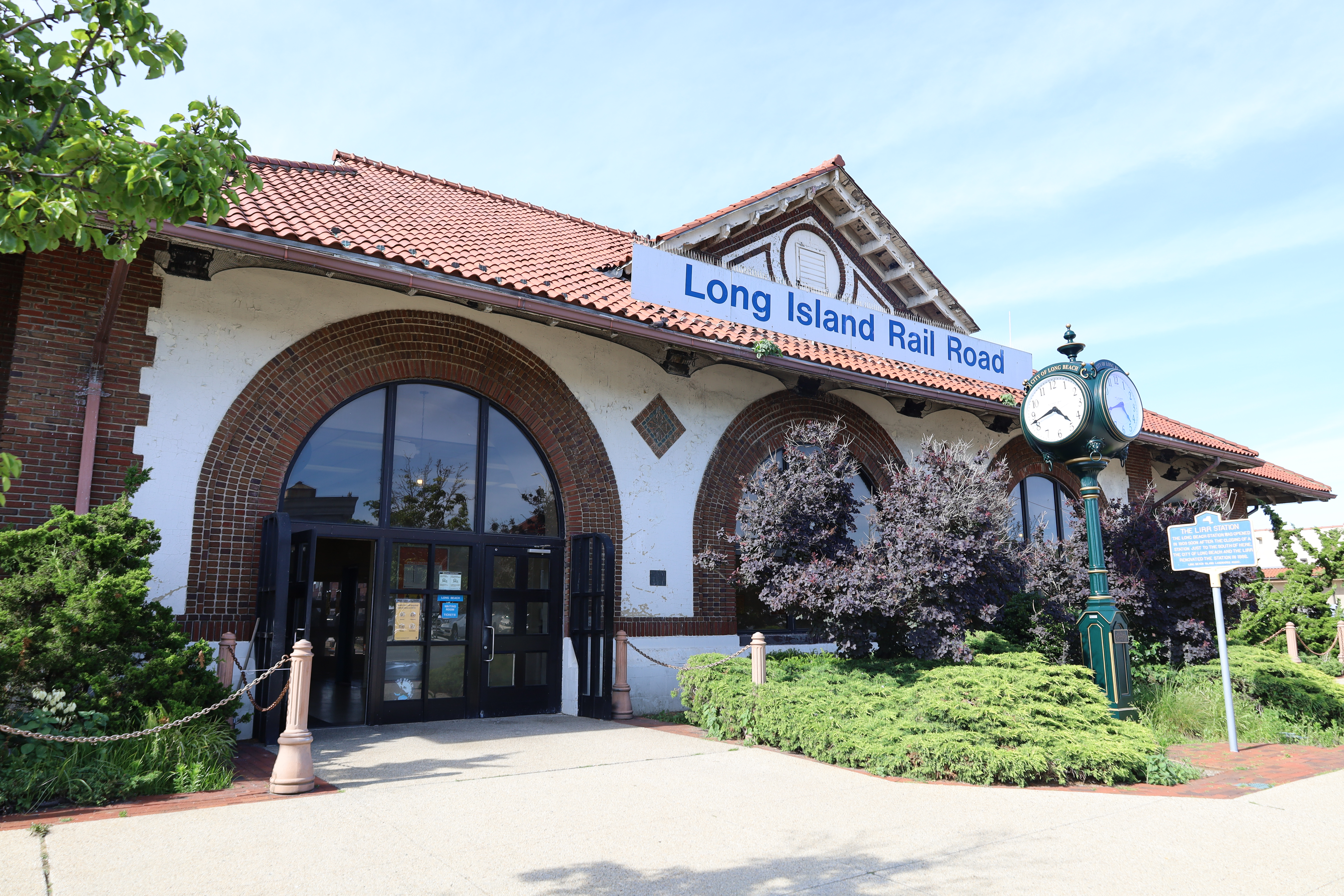
The Long Beach Long Island Rail Road station in 2021

The Long Island Rail Road operates a terminal station at Park Place and Park Avenue with service on the railroad's Long Beach Branch. All other public transportation services in Long Beach converge at this terminal. Most trains run to Penn Station (Manhattan) or Atlantic Terminal (Brooklyn).

== Notable people ==
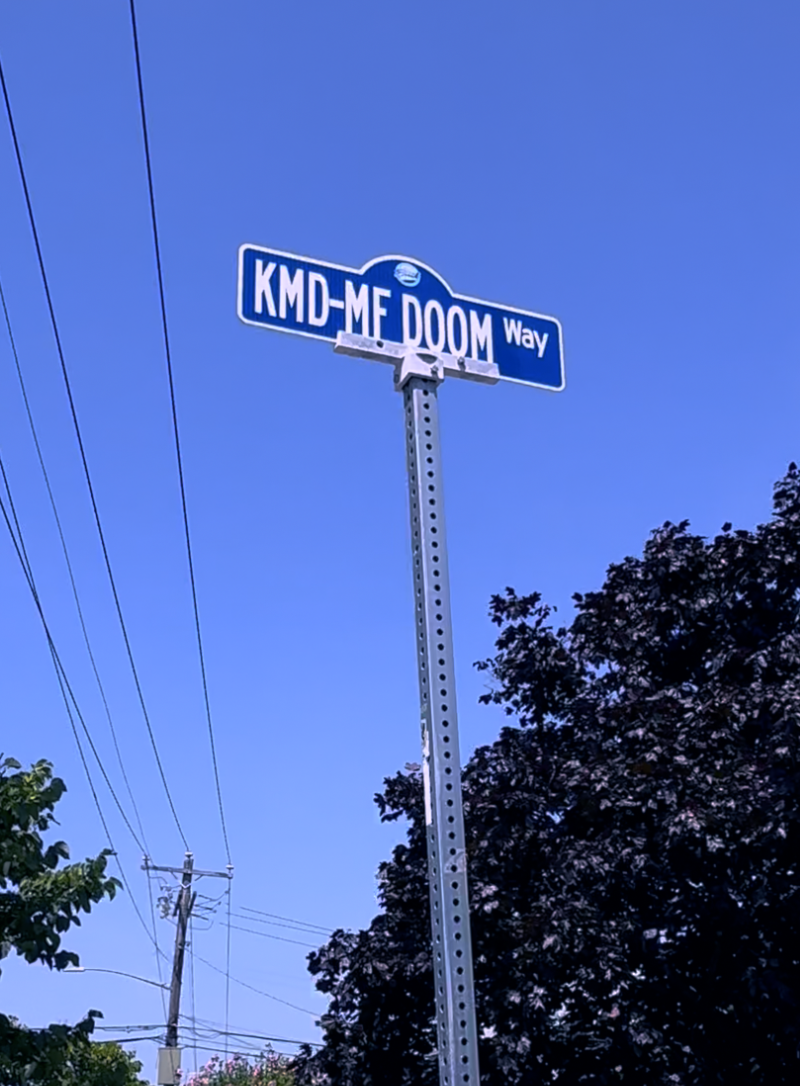
MF DOOM street sign, named after the hip-hop artist

- Lil Peep (born Gustav Elijah Åhr, 1996–2017), rapper and singer, raised in Long Beach from 2001 to 2016.
- Larry Brown (born 1940), basketball star and coach, graduated from Long Beach High School.
- Loring Buzzell (1927–1959), music publisher and record label executive.
- Vernon and Irene Castle, dance pioneers who introduced dances such as tango and foxtrot to the US in the 1910s; they lived in Long Beach and operated a nightclub called "Castles By the Sea".
- Alan Colmes (1950–2017), political analyst formerly on Hannity & Colmes, resided in Long Beach
- Billy Crystal (born 1948), film and television actor who was raised in Long Beach
- Peter David, (1956–2025) comics writer, novelist, and screenwriter, known as the co-creator of Spider-Man 2099, and for his influential 12-year run on The Incredible Hulk.
- MF Doom (born Daniel Dumile, 1971–2020), hip-hop recording artist/producer, raised in Long Beach. In 2021, the street MF DOOM grew up on was renamed KMD-MF DOOM WAY in honor of the late rapper and the group KMD.
- Amy Fisher (born 1974), also known as the "Long Island Lolita"
- Mike Francesa (born 1954), WFAN 660AM New York City radio host, was born and raised in Long Beach.
- Jason Freeny (born 1970) Toy designer, lived in Long Beach
- James "Scottie" Graham (born 1969) former Ohio State and NFL player, grew up in Long Beach and graduated from the high school
- Smith Hart (1948–2017), professional wrestler, member of the Hart wrestling family.
- Eleanor Holm (1913–2004), Olympic swimmer, movie star, star of the Aquacade, grew up in Long Beach
- Louis Ignarro (born 1941), pharmacologist who was awarded the Nobel Prize in Medicine in 1988, grew up in Long Beach
- Derek Jeter (born 1974), former New York Yankees shortstop and former team captain, lived in Long Beach
- Joan Jett (born 1958), rock singer
- Pete Johnson (born 1954), running back who played eight seasons in the NFL, primarily with the Cincinnati Bengals
- John Lannan (born 1984), pitcher for the New York Mets
- Allard K. Lowenstein (1929–1980), congressman, anti-Vietnam War leader, and liberal activist who represented it in Congress in the late 1960s
- Charlie McAvoy (born 1997), defenseman for the Boston Bruins
- Maurice Mitchell (born 1979), is an American activist and member of hardcore punk band, Cipher.
- Irving D. Neustein (1901–1979), member of the New York State Assembly
- Johan Peñaranda (born 2000), soccer player
- Audrey Peppe (1917–1992), figure skater, member of three US Olympic teams, runner-up for the national championship.
- Mike Portnoy (born 1967), drummer, founder and current member of Dream Theater, American progressive rock band.
- Rick Rubin (born 1963), American record producer, co-founder of Def Jam Recordings, founder of American Recordings, and former co-president of Columbia Records, born in Long Beach and graduated from the high school

== In popular culture ==
- In Woody Allen's Zelig (1983), shots of Long Beach were used in some of the movie's scenes.
- An episode of The Sopranos (season 6) featured a scene filmed at The People's Church (located in the West End of Long Beach).
- The Netflix show "You" filmed at the Laurel Diner which led the diner to create a special menu item called "The Goldburg."
- The Movie Standing Up, Falling Down starring Ben Schwartz and Billy Crystal filmed in numerous locations around Long Beach (including the now closed coffee shop Gentle Brew).

== See also ==
- List of Municipalities in New York
- Glen Cove, New York – Another city in Nassau County
