= Queenswater station =

Train station in New York, US (1898–1936)

Queenswater

General information
- Location: South side of the Reynolds Channel; Long Beach, New York
- Coordinates: 40.593845°N 73.662995°W
- Platforms: 2
- Tracks: 2

History
- Opened: April 1898 (NY&LB)
- Closed: June 1936
- Former names: Inner Beach

Former services
Preceding station	Long Island Rail Road	Following station
Wreck Lead toward Lynbrook	Long Beach Branch	Long Beach Terminus
Location

Queenswater was a train station along the Long Beach Branch of the Long Island Rail Road. It was located along Reynolds Channel and was used between 1898 and 1936 to serve numerous fishing clubs and hotels.

== History ==
Queenswater station was originally built by the New York and Long Beach Railroad as a signal stop in April 1898 and was named "Inner Beach." It consisted entirely of a single low cinder wooden platform, and had no depot building. The station was located south of Reynolds Channel on the east side of the track across from where the freight yard lead left the main line 0.3 miles (0.48 km) west of Long Beach. It served several fishing shacks and eventually the Molitor's Hotel on Long Beach Island. Thirteen months after the station was established, the name of the station was changed to "Queenswater."

Repeated storm damage to the original Long Beach station, as well as the rails and equipment leading to it forced community members to demand that the terminus be relocated from the Atlantic Ocean to Reynolds Channel. The city got its wish, and the new terminal was built in 1909, which forced the closure of Club House station. Unfortunately, the new terminal was now a mere 1,584 feet (483 m) south of Queenswater. The LIRR tried unsuccessfully to seek permission from the New York Public Service Commission to close the station 1910, and again in 1915 by removing fishing shanties. The nearby Wreck Lead station closed on December 31, 1927, but Queenswater station remained in operation until it was finally closed in June 1936.

== See also ==
- Long Beach Branch
