= Wreck Lead Bridge =

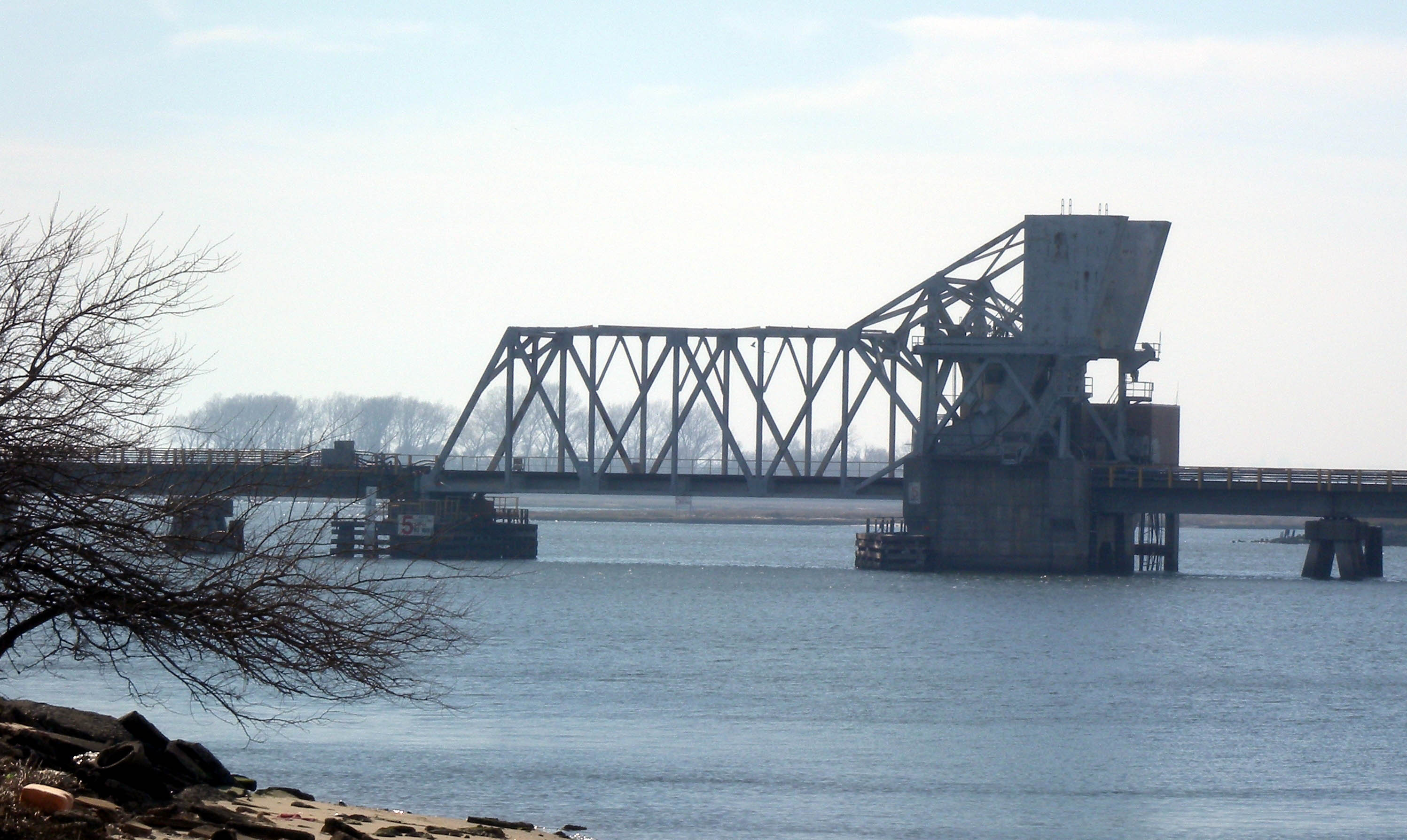
- The Wreck Lead Bridge in 2009.
- Coordinates: 40°35′44.0″N 73°39′41.4″W
- Carries: LIRR Long Beach Branch
- Crosses: Reynolds Channel
- Locale: Nassau County, New York
- Owner: Metropolitan Transportation Authority
- Maintained by: Long Island Rail Road

Characteristics
- Design: Bascule bridge
- Material: Steel and concrete
- Total length: 1,310 feet (400 m)
- Clearance below: 17 feet (5.2 m)

Rail characteristics
- No. of tracks: 1
- Track gauge: 4 ft 8 1/2 in (1,435 mm) standard gauge
- Electrified: Third rail, 750 V DC

History
- Construction cost: $25.4 million (current bridge, 1988 USD)
- Opened: 1880 (original bridge); 1988 (current bridge)
- Rebuilt: 1987–1988

Location
- Interactive map of Wreck Lead Bridge

The Wreck Lead Bridge is a railroad drawbridge carrying the Long Beach Branch of the Long Island Rail Road over Reynolds Channel, between the City of Long Beach and the Village of Island Park, in Nassau County, New York, United States.

== Design ==
The Wreck Lead Bridge is a steel and concrete bascule bridge. It carries a single track across the channel, with the Long Beach station to its south and the Island Park station to its north. When in the closed position, the bridge's bascule span, located midstream, has a clearance below of 17 feet (5.2 m) above the high-tide mark.

== History ==
The original Wreck Lead Bridge was a wooden swing bridge which was built in 1880, upon the construction of the present-day Long Beach Branch to Long Beach. By the 1980s, it was in need of replacement, with its deck frequently being stuck & subsequently delaying train and/or boat traffic; the bridge was also vulnerable to flooding due to its low spans, which caused the swing bridge mechanisms to regularly be submerged in saltwater. A modern replacement span was soon proposed by officials, and the plans were finalized by the latter half of the decade following the LIRR, Town of Hempstead, Village of Island Park, City of Long Beach, and the United States Coast Guard all agreeing on the plans.

Construction on the current bridge commenced in 1987 and was finished in the spring of 1988. The opening of the $25.4 million bridge occurred on May 9 of that year. It has a deck which sits 10 feet (3.0 m) higher than the one on its predecessor, allowing for more boats to pass underneath it without the bridge needing to open; the reduction in required bridge openings also improved train service and capacity. As part of the replacement project, the locations of both the maritime navigation channel and the bridge's bascule section were shifted southwards, from their previous location along the Island Park shore to their current location midstream.

The current bridge's bascule span was originally built and used as one of the Seaboard Coast Line Railroad's former drawbridges in Placida, Florida; service on that line ceased upon the railroad's decision to discontinue its Placida–Boca Grande freight route. When planning the bridge, the MTA purchased the then-16-year-old span for $475,000 (1986 USD) and shipped it to New York by barge; reusing the bascule span saved the LIRR an estimated $1 million (1986 USD) in project costs.

In the 2010s, following Superstorm Sandy, the MTA announced that the bridge, along with the rest of the Long Beach Branch (which was severely damaged during Sandy), would undergo a major bridge rehabilitation and modernization project which would fortify it against future floods. As part of the project, the bridge received an emergency generator and improved electrical systems to make it more resilient in the event of severe storms. Many of the bridge's aging underwater power cables were also replaced.

== See also ==
- Manhasset Viaduct – Another major LIRR bridge.
- Wreck Lead station – A former LIRR station near the bridge.
