= Oceanside, New York =

- Hamlet and census-designated place
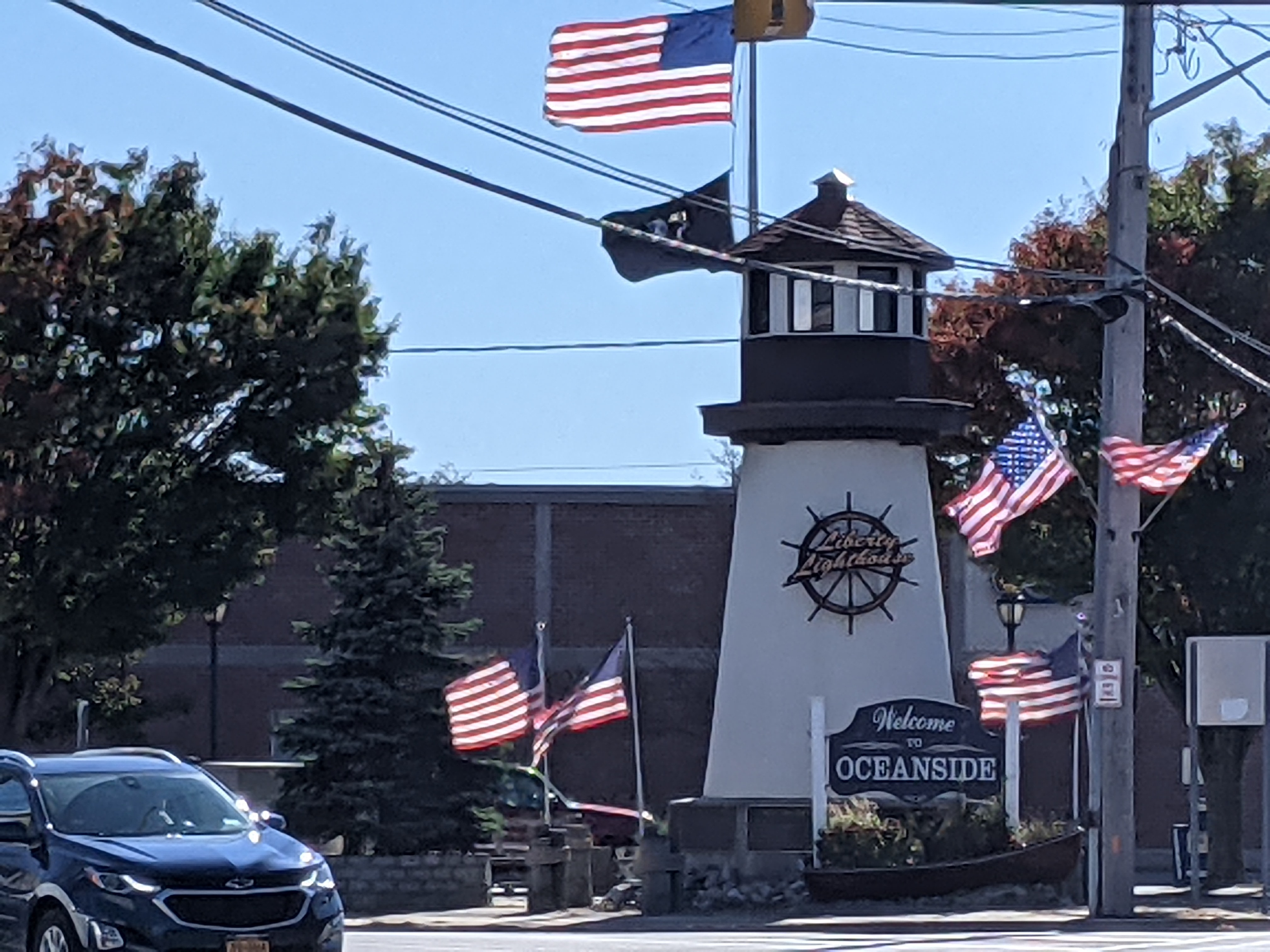
- Oceanside's Liberty Lighthouse at Veterans Triangle in 2021

- Location in Nassau County and the state of New York

- Location on Long Island Location within the state of New York
- Coordinates: 40°38′11″N 73°38′15″W
- Country: United States
- State: New York
- County: Nassau
- Town: Hempstead

Area
  - Total: 5.43 sq mi (14.06 km^{2})
  - Land: 4.93 sq mi (12.77 km^{2})
  - Water: 0.50 sq mi (1.30 km^{2})
- Elevation: 9.8 ft (3 m)

Population (2020)
  - Total: 32,637
  - Density: 6,620.1/sq mi (2,556.05/km^{2})
- Time zone: UTC-5 (Eastern (EST))
  - Summer (DST): UTC-4 (EDP)
- ZIP Codes: 11572 (Oceanside); 11510 (Baldwin)
- Area codes: 516, 363
- FIPS code: 36-54441
- GNIS feature ID: 0959214

Oceanside is a hamlet and census-designated place (CDP) located in the southern part of the Town of Hempstead, in Nassau County, New York, United States. The population was 32,637 at the time of the 2020 census.

== History ==
Originally known as South Bay, the English government established a township there in 1674 called Christian Hook, basing the name on the predominant religious affiliation of colonists in the area. Land development proceeded rapidly, and oyster sales took their place as a dominant force, with the local business "Mott's Landing" becoming a favorite place to buy oysters.

=== 19th century ===
In the 19th century, the town residents decided that "Oceanville" sounded better than "Christian Hook": it was "Oceanville Oysters" that sold, and in 1864, the new name became official. However, there was already an Oceanville in New York, so "OceanSide", as one word, was adopted as the town's name in 1890 (this despite it not actually fronting the Atlantic Ocean, which is located a few miles to the south. It is separated from the ocean by Reynolds Channel and other marsh islands, as well as the Long Beach Barrier Island).

The Oceanside Fire Department was established in 1909. Columbia Engine Co. #1, an old firehouse, still exists today, and is located at the southwest corner of the triangle where Lincoln Avenue meets Long Beach Road.

=== 20th century ===
In the 1900s, the town began rapidly expanding south, building over swamps and marshes and dramatically increasing the size of the town from a small port to a large hamlet. In 1918, the name was condensed to "Oceanside".

Nathan's Famous opened its second restaurant ever on June 4, 1959, on Long Beach Road in Oceanside, taking over the site of the once-popular Roadside Rest, which had opened several decades before and had offered live entertainment and dancing on a large dance floor as well as Nathan's-type frankfurters and locally caught seafood. There was a large Nathan's building with play areas and a big open dining room that had a stage. Shows were family events. The building was demolished in 1976, and a strip mall was built in its place. A modern Nathan's franchise subsequently opened on a small section of the original property, at the corner of Long Beach Road and Windsor Parkway. In 2016, Nathan's moved to a smaller location on Long Beach Road.

Oceanside was a part of the post-World War II housing boom, with even more land being built over with houses and as a result, the town began to resemble Levittown. More schools and massive houses were built, and a public park was constructed on the swampland. Because of this, Oceanside became more vulnerable to floods and natural disasters.

=== 21st century ===
In 2012, Oceanside saw its worst natural disaster when Hurricane Sandy hit the area. The storm completely flooded the southern portion of the town with areas as far north as Nathan's reporting waves of water rushing down streets. Sandy also knocked out power for nearly two weeks after a substation in the nearby town of Island Park exploded. Oceanside was one of the many towns upset with the slow response from the Long Island Power Authority and held a rally because of it. As of 2019, Oceanside still has many who are dealing with the consequences of Sandy, and some have begun leaving, with the value of houses remaining high. Flooding in low-lying areas would be much more common.

In 2014, after years of speculation and lack of business, Nathan's announced it was moving to a smaller location on the corner of Long Beach Road and Merle Avenue (near the former Chwatsky). This move was greeted with controversy as many feared that the traffic from deliveries would interfere with the traffic headed to the school during weekdays. Eventually, the Town of Hempstead approved this move and the original building was officially closed on January 4, 2015. The third Nathan's opened in early 2015, and was built as a throwback to both the first and second locations as well as having a contemporary feel to the interior. In 2016, a massive blizzard slammed into the island and dumped nearly 2 feet of snow, and flooded many of the towns around it and some portions of the town closest to the channel. In 2025 the old Oceanside Library was demolished and rebuilt as a more spacious and modern building, with two floors.

== Geography ==
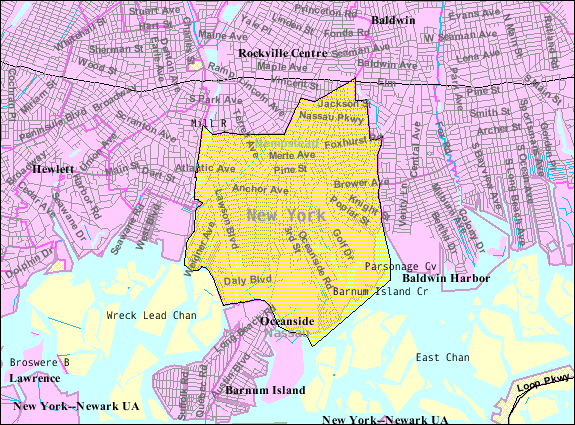
U.S. Census map of Oceanside

According to the United States Census Bureau, the community has a total area of 5.4 square miles (14 km^{2}), of which 5.0 square miles (13 km^{2}) is land and 0.4 square miles (1.0 km^{2}), or 7.38%, is water.

The town was built over swampland spanning from the early 1900s to the late 1970s. Most of the town before this, was a small sea port near the more established villages of Rockville Centre, Baldwin, and East Rockaway. The area of the town increased exponentially and its population would boom to nearly 30,000 people by the end of the 1990s.

=== Climate ===
Oceanside has a humid subtropical climate (Cfa) and average monthly temperatures in the village centre range from 32.1 °F in January to 74.8 °F in July. The local hardiness zone is 7b.

Climate data for Oceanside, New York (1991–2020)
Month	Jan	Feb	Mar	Apr	May	Jun	Jul	Aug	Sep	Oct	Nov	Dec	Year
Mean daily maximum °F (°C)	39.3 (4.1)	41.8 (5.4)	48.2 (9.0)	59.0 (15.0)	67.4 (19.7)	76.1 (24.5)	81.8 (27.7)	81.5 (27.5)	75.3 (24.1)	64.0 (17.8)	53.7 (12.1)	44.4 (6.9)	61.0 (16.2)
Daily mean °F (°C)	32.6 (0.3)	34.2 (1.2)	40.4 (4.7)	50.2 (10.1)	59.3 (15.2)	68.4 (20.2)	74.5 (23.6)	74.0 (23.3)	67.4 (19.7)	56.2 (13.4)	46.1 (7.8)	37.8 (3.2)	53.4 (11.9)
Mean daily minimum °F (°C)	26.0 (−3.3)	26.7 (−2.9)	32.7 (0.4)	41.4 (5.2)	51.2 (10.7)	60.8 (16.0)	67.1 (19.5)	66.5 (19.2)	59.5 (15.3)	48.4 (9.1)	38.5 (3.6)	31.3 (−0.4)	45.8 (7.7)
Average precipitation inches (mm)	3.81 (97)	3.01 (76)	4.64 (118)	4.16 (106)	4.31 (109)	4.57 (116)	4.25 (108)	4.16 (106)	3.76 (96)	4.30 (109)	3.57 (91)	4.10 (104)	48.64 (1,236)
Average snowfall inches (cm)	5.7 (14)	7.6 (19)	4.8 (12)	1.0 (2.5)	0.0 (0.0)	0.0 (0.0)	0.0 (0.0)	0.0 (0.0)	0.0 (0.0)	0.0 (0.0)	0.2 (0.51)	6.2 (16)	25.5 (64.01)
Source: NOAA

== Demographics ==
Historical population
Census	Pop.	Note	%±
2000	32,733		—
2010	32,109		−1.9%
2020	32,637		1.6%
U.S. Decennial Census

=== 2019–2023 ACS ===
According to the United States Census Bureau’s American Community Survey (ACS) 2019–2023 five-year estimates, Oceanside had a population of 31,907. The median age was 44.6 years. Approximately 22.0% of residents were under the age of 18, while 21.1% were 65 years of age or older.U.S. Census Bureau, American Community Survey, 2019–2023 ACS 5-Year Estimates.Oceanside, New York, US Civic Data. Accessed October 25, 2026.

There were 11,268 housing units, of which 10,887 were occupied. The average household size was 2.92 people. Approximately 92.1% of occupied housing units were owner-occupied, while 7.9% were renter-occupied. About 3.4% of housing units were vacant.

The median household income was $145,282, while the median value of owner-occupied housing units was approximately $626,700. The median gross rent was $2,118 per month. Approximately 2.7% of residents lived below the poverty line.

Among residents aged 25 and older, 47.9% had attained a bachelor’s degree or higher. The mean travel time to work was 36 minutes. Of workers aged 16 and over, 63.1% drove alone to work, 7.6% carpooled, 11.5% used public transportation, and 14.8% worked from home.

The racial and ethnic composition of Oceanside was 78.1% non-Hispanic White, 1.7% Black or African American, and 2.9% Asian, with smaller percentages belonging to other racial groups. Hispanic or Latino residents of any race comprised 15.7% of the population.

The population was distributed by age as follows: 5.0% were under the age of 5, 17.0% were between the ages of 5 and 17, 7.3% were between 18 and 24, 9.7% were between 25 and 34, 11.5% were between 35 and 44, 14.2% were between 45 and 54, 14.1% were between 55 and 64, 12.6% were between 65 and 74, and 8.5% were 75 years of age or older.

=== 2020 census ===
As of the 2020 census, Oceanside had a population of 32,637. The median age was 43.6 years. 21.0% of residents were under the age of 18 and 19.7% of residents were 65 years of age or older. For every 100 females there were 90.9 males, and for every 100 females age 18 and over there were 88.1 males age 18 and over.

100.0% of residents lived in urban areas, while 0.0% lived in rural areas.

There were 11,212 households in Oceanside, of which 34.0% had children under the age of 18 living in them. Of all households, 61.9% were married-couple households, 10.9% were households with a male householder and no spouse or partner present, and 23.3% were households with a female householder and no spouse or partner present. About 18.0% of all households were made up of individuals and 11.9% had someone living alone who was 65 years of age or older. The average household size was 2.9 people.

There were 11,552 housing units, of which 2.9% were vacant. The homeowner vacancy rate was 0.7% and the rental vacancy rate was 4.3%.

The median income of a household was $136,997 per year, and the per capita income was $58,400. Some 3.2% of residents lived below the poverty line.

Racial composition as of the 2020 census
Race	Number	Percent
White	26,333	80.7%
Black or African American	706	2.2%
American Indian and Alaska Native	75	0.2%
Asian	1,198	3.7%
Native Hawaiian and Other Pacific Islander	2	0.0%
Some other race	1,751	5.4%
Two or more races	2,572	7.9%
Hispanic or Latino (of any race)	4,529	13.9%

=== 2010 census ===
As of the 2010 census the population was 92.2% White, 85.9% Non-Hispanic White 1.7% African American, 0.1% Native American, 2.7% Asian, 0.0% Pacific Islander, 2.4% from other races, and 1.3% from two or more races. Hispanic or Latino of any race were 9.2% of the population.

=== 2000 census ===
As of the census of 2000, there were 32,733 people, 12,930 households, and 12,394 families residing in the area. The population density was 6,523.6 inhabitants per square mile (2,518.8/km^{2}). There were 11,396 housing units at an average density of 2,271.2 per square mile (876.9/km^{2}). The racial makeup of the CDP was 94.95% White, 0.56% African American, 0.80% Native American, 1.83% Asian, 0.01% Pacific Islander, 1.58% from other races, and 1.00% from two or more races. Hispanic or Latino of any race were 5.90% of the population.

There were 11,224 households, out of which 36.9% had children under the age of 18 living with them, 69.5% were married couples living together, 8.8% had a female householder with no husband present, and 18.7% were non-families. 16.1% of all households were made up of individuals, and 9.1% had someone living alone who was 65 years of age or older. The average household size was 2.90 and the average family size was 3.25.

In the community, the population was spread out, with 25.0% under the age of 18, 6.1% from 18 to 24, 27.6% from 25 to 44, 25.7% from 45 to 64, and 15.6% who were 65 years of age or older. The median age was 40 years. For every 100 females, there were 93.7 males. For every 100 females age 18 and over, there were 89.5 males.

According to a 2007 estimate, the median income for a household in the community was $100,167, and the median income for a family was $109,937. Males had a median income of $55,652 versus $40,163 for females. The per capita income for the CDP was $30,245. About 2.8% of families and 3.5% of the population were below the poverty line, including 3.8% of those under age 18 and 3.9% of those age 65 or over.

== Government ==
All of Oceanside is in New York's 4th congressional district, which is represented by Congresswoman Laura Gillen. Despite Democratic Victories in the past, Donald Trump won the popular vote in Oceanside in the 2016 election.

== Education ==
=== Public education ===
The CDP is within the Oceanside School District. Presently, Phyllis Harrington is the superintendent of the Oceanside School District. She replaced Dr. Herb Brown, who retired at the end of the 2012–13 school year.

Oceanside's first school was built around 1838 on the northwest corner of Oceanside and Foxhurst Roads. It only had one room and an attic. The structure still stood as of 1960, but was moved and is now a private dwelling. The land where the school once stood is now known as the Schoolhouse Green, where many school events are held. Oceanside schools have adopted numerical names, 1 through 9. School #1 was razed in 1981. Today, Schools #2-5, 8 and 9E are elementary schools, School #6 is a kindergarten center, School #7 is a high school, and #9M serves as the middle school. School #9 bears the name of Walter Boardman.

=== Colleges and universities ===
Nearby colleges include Adelphi University, Nassau Community College, Molloy College, Hofstra University, New York Institute of Technology, Farmingdale State College, Stony Brook University, and C.W. Post College.

== Transportation ==
=== Road ===
Long Beach Road, Oceanside Road, Foxhurst Road, Lawson Boulevard, and Atlantic Avenue are some of the main roads in Oceanside. Other roads such as Brower Avenue and Waukena Avenue, which were built as residential streets, also carry major traffic. Sunrise Highway (NY 27) is located along the Northern border of the hamlet, with Rockville Centre and Baldwin. Merrick Road briefly passes through the hamlet, near Mt. Sinai South Nassau Hospital.

=== Rail ===
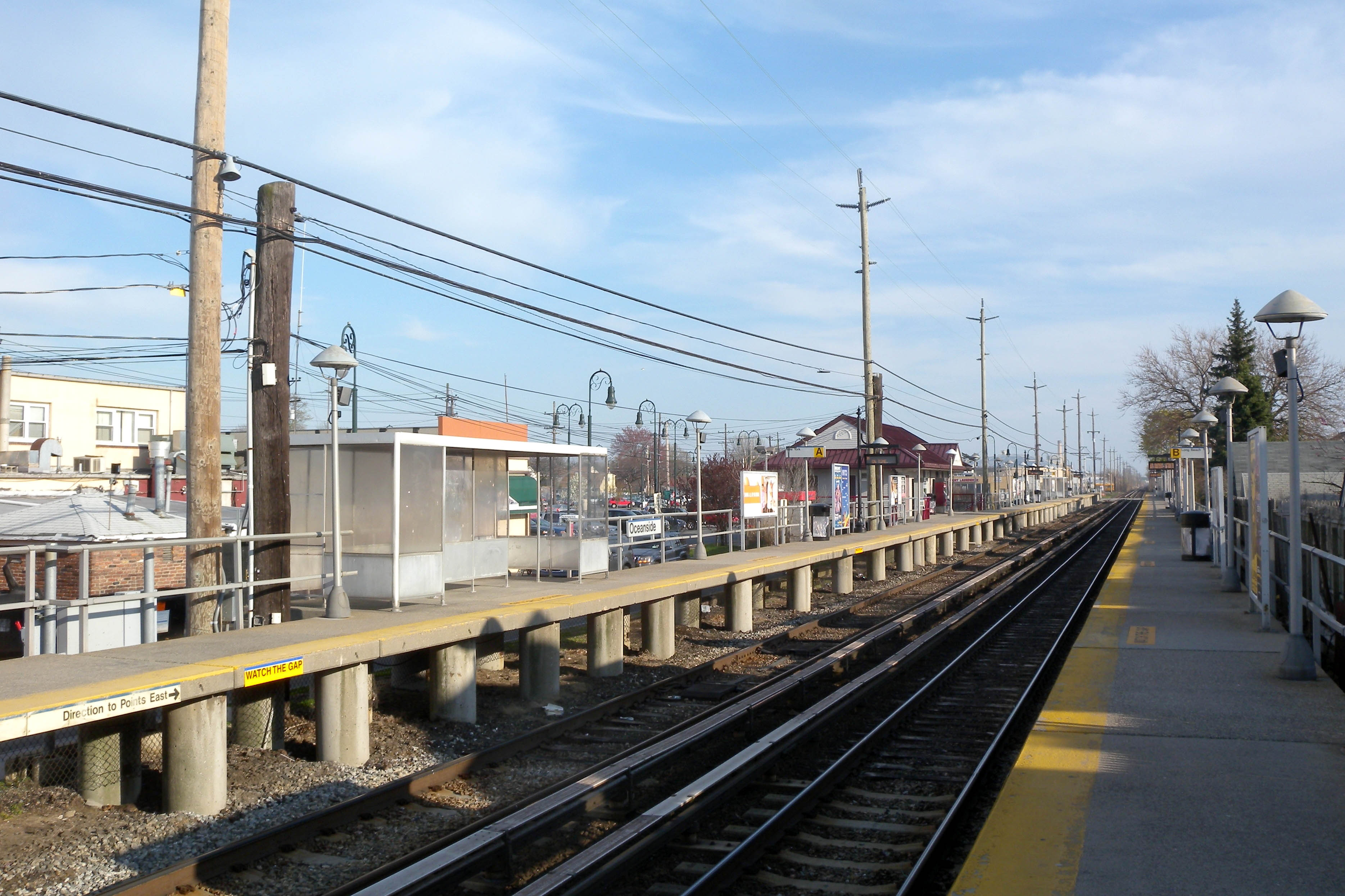
The Oceanside LIRR station in 2009

The Long Beach Branch of the Long Island Rail Road travels north–south through the western portions of Oceanside, with the Oceanside station being located at Weidner Avenue and Lawson Boulevard. The Oceanside station is the third train station south on the Long Beach Branch. The travel time from the Oceanside station to Penn Station is approximately 40 minutes. In the northern part of Oceanside, many commuters use either the nearby Rockville Centre station or Baldwin station on the LIRR's Babylon Branch.

=== Bus ===
The Nassau Inter-County Express passes through Oceanside with the n4 and n15 routes. The n36 served Oceanside until 2017, and the n16 also served Oceanside until 2012, but saw its route shortened due to budget cuts. There is presently no bus headed for the Oceanside LIRR nor are there plans for this.

== Notable people ==
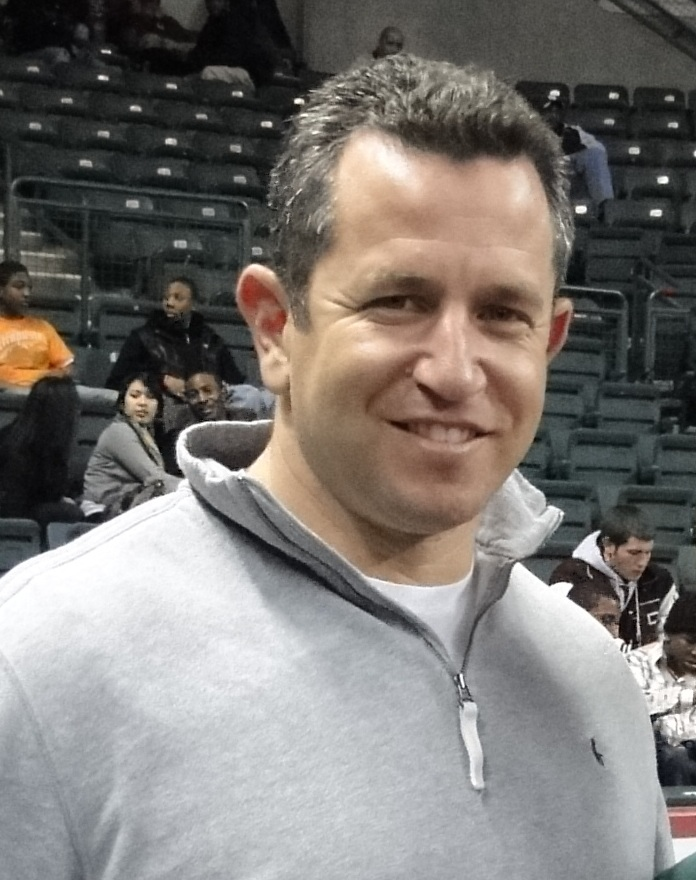
Jay Fiedler

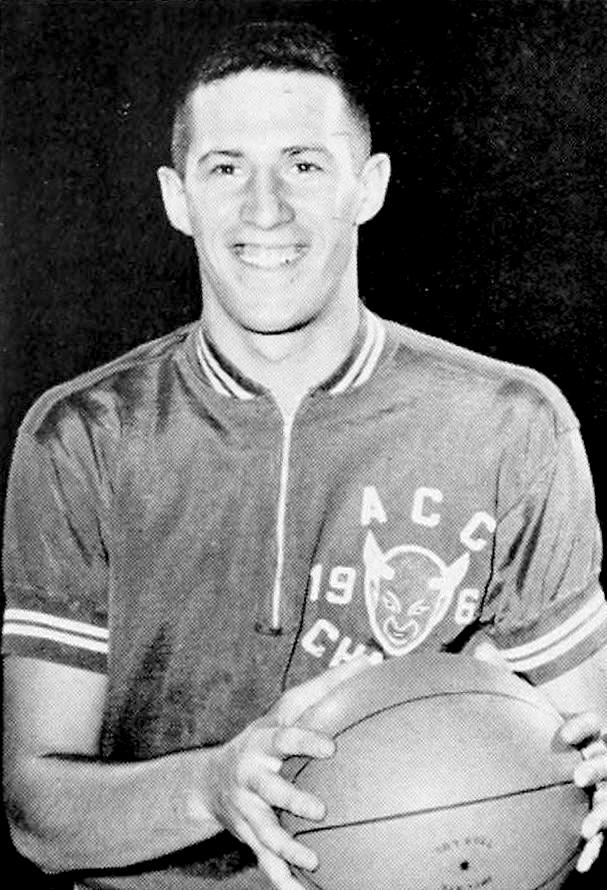
Art Heyman

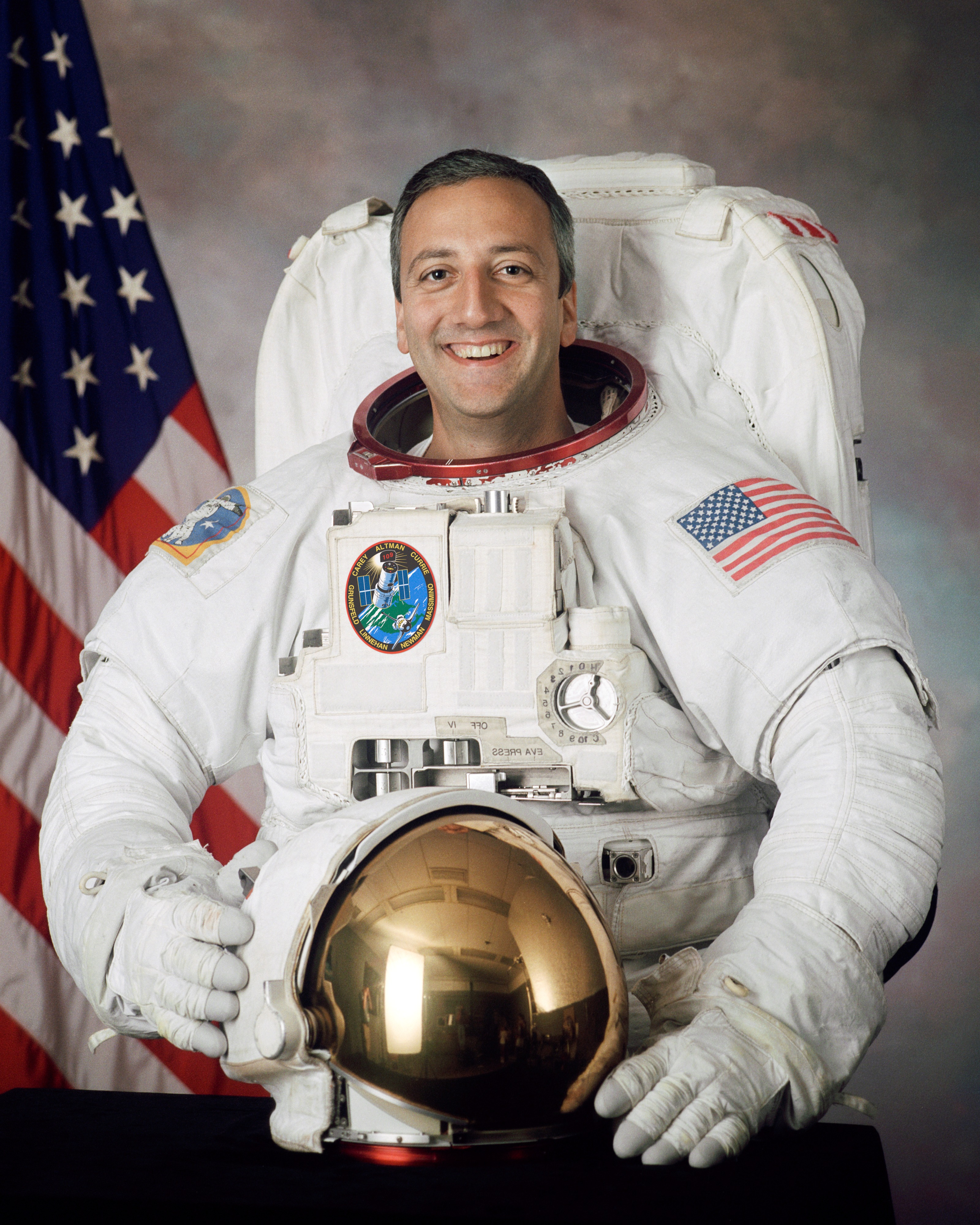
Mike Massimino

- Ron Atansaio (born 1956), soccer player
- Glenn Gordon Caron (born 1954), writer, director, and producer
- Thomas H. Cormen (born 1956), computer scientist, co-author of Introduction to Algorithms
- Wayne Diamond, fashion designer
- Don Diamont (born 1962), actor known for his roles as Brad Carlton on The Young and the Restless and Bill Spencer Jr. on The Bold and the Beautiful.
- Warren Eckstein (born 1949), pet behaviorist, animal trainer, animal rights activist, humorist, and author
- Arthur Rose Eldred (1895–1951), first Eagle Scout (Boy Scouts of America).
- Jay Fiedler (born 1971), former NFL quarterback for the Minnesota Vikings, Jacksonville Jaguars, Tampa Bay Buccaneers, Philadelphia Eagles, Miami Dolphins, and New York Jets.
- Susie Fishbein (born 1968), best-selling Orthodox Jewish kosher cookbook author.
- Ricky Ian Gordon (born 1956), composer of art song, opera and musical theatre
- Shep Gordon (born 1945), talent manager, Hollywood film agent, and producer.
- Moshe Gottesman (born 1932), rabbi and dean for the Hebrew Academy of Nassau County
- Gilda Gray (1895–1959), Polish-American "flapper", 1920s-'30s, known as the "Shimmy Queen" and Florenz Ziegfeld's "golden girl"
- Murray Handwerker (1921–2011), businessman
- Art Heyman (1941–2012), college basketball AP Player of the Year (1963) and NBA player
- Bob Iger (born 1951), CEO of The Walt Disney Company
- Dan Ingram (1934-2018), disc jockey
- Leon Johnson (born 1974), former professional football player
- Norman Lent (1931– 2012), New York State Senator and member of the US House of Representatives
- Dennis Leonard (born 1951), member of the Kansas City Royals Hall of Fame, started Game 5 of the 1976 and 1977 ALCS vs. the New York Yankees, won Game 4 of the 1980 World Series vs. the Philadelphia Phillies
- Tomas Masaryk (1850–1937), first president of Czechoslovakia, the "Father of the Czech Nation"; lived in Oceanside for a time during his exile of 1918
- Mike Massimino (born 1962), NASA astronaut and professor of mechanical engineering at Columbia University
- Stephen Robert Morse, American-British Emmy-nominated producer and director
- David Paymer (born 1954), actor (Carpool)
- Frank Pellegrino (1944–2017), actor (GoodFellas, Law & Order, The Sopranos)
- Darby Penney (1952–2021), writer, activist
- Andrew Pollack (born 1966), school safety activist
- Betty Robbins (1924–2005), cantor
- William Rose (1909–1972), illustrator and film poster artist
- Michael Rosenbaum (born 1972), actor, singer, and film producer
- Jackie Tohn (born c. 1980/1981), actress and musician
- Al Trautwig (born 1956), sportscaster, 2000 NYC Sportscaster of the Year
- Ernie Vandeweghe (1928-2014), Knicks star and father of NBA player and executive Kiki Vandeweghe
- Harold E. Varmus (born 1939), co-recipient of the 1989 Nobel Prize in Physiology or Medicine
- Reginald VelJohnson (born 1952), actor best known for his role as Carl Winslow on Family Matters
- Ann Dryden Witte (born 1942), economist and university professor

== In popular culture ==
Exterior of the Greater Lincoln Shopping Center used in the Netflix show Maniac

- Exteriors of the Greater Lincoln Shopping Center were used in the Netflix series Maniac.

== See also ==
- Baldwin Harbor, New York
- East Rockaway, New York
