= Wreck Lead station =

Train station in New York, US (1888–1927)

Wreck Lead

General information
- Location: Northeast side of the Reynolds Channel; Island Park, New York
- Coordinates: 40.596690°N 73.660057°W
- Platforms: 2
- Tracks: 2

History
- Opened: June 1888 (NY&LB)
- Closed: December 21, 1927

Former services
Preceding station	Long Island Rail Road	Following station
Island Park toward Lynbrook	Long Beach Branch	Queenswater toward Long Beach
Location

Wreck Lead was a train station along the Long Beach Branch of the Long Island Rail Road. The station was opened in June 1888 by the New York and Long Beach Railroad to serve numerous fishing clubs and hotels. This station was a flag stop. Wreck Lead consisted of a low cinder platform on the northeast side of the Reynolds Channel (south of here, the railroad traverses the channel via the Wreck Lead Bridge). In 1911, a second platform was installed on the west side of the tracks and on January 15, 1927, and Wreck Lead became the terminus of the double-tracking of the Long Beach Branch. Wreck Lead closed on December 31, 1927.

== See also ==
- Long Beach Branch
