= Island Park station =

Long Island Rail Road station in Nassau County, New York

Island Park
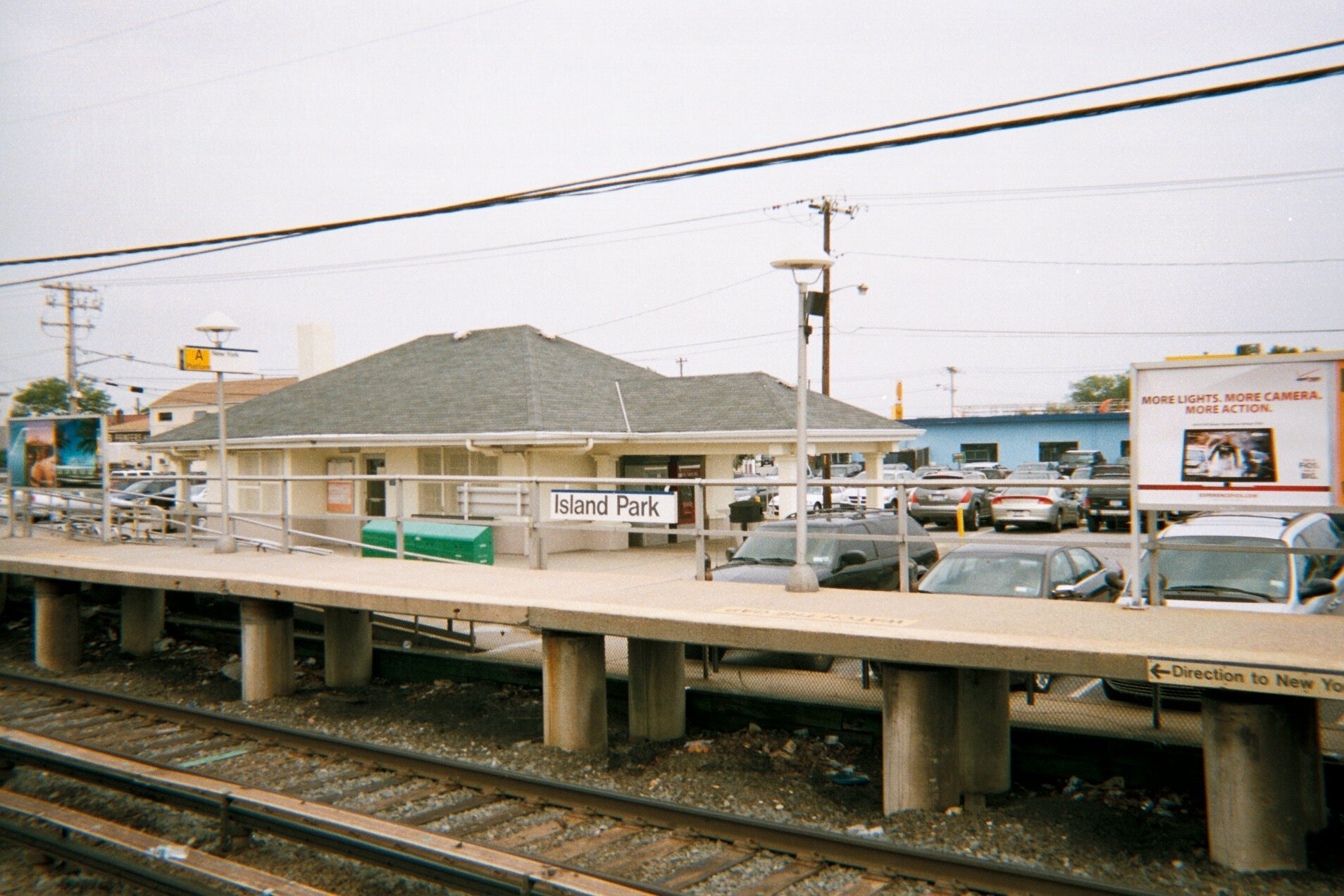
- Island Park's station house, as seen in 2009.

General information
- Location: Long Beach Road & Austin Boulevard; Island Park, New York
- Coordinates: 40.600433°N 73.655388°W
- Owner: Long Island Rail Road
- Line: Long Beach Branch
- Platforms: 2 side platforms
- Tracks: 2
- Connections: Nassau Inter-County Express: n15

Construction
- Parking: Yes
- Cycle facilities: Yes
- Accessible: Yes

Other information
- Station code: IPK
- Fare zone: 7

History
- Opened: 1898 (NY&LB)
- Rebuilt: 1923
- Electrified: September 1910; 750 V (DC) third rail
- Former names: The Dykes (1898–1924)

Passengers
- 2012—2014: 3,062

Services
Preceding station	Long Island Rail Road	Following station
Oceanside toward Penn Station or Grand Central	Long Beach Branch	Long Beach Terminus
Former services
Preceding station	Long Island Rail Road	Following station
Oceanside toward Lynbrook	Long Beach Branch	Wreck Lead toward Long Beach
Location

Island Park is a station on the Long Island Rail Road's Long Beach Branch serving the residents of Island Park, Barnum Island, and Harbor Isle. The station can platform a 12-car train and is fully wheelchair accessible with ramps from street level. Parking facilities are also available. Southwest of the station the train crosses over Reynolds Channel via the Wreck Lead Bridge.

The station is located at the southern intersection of Long Beach Road and Austin Boulevard, and is 23.7 miles (38.1 km) from Penn Station in Midtown Manhattan.

== History ==
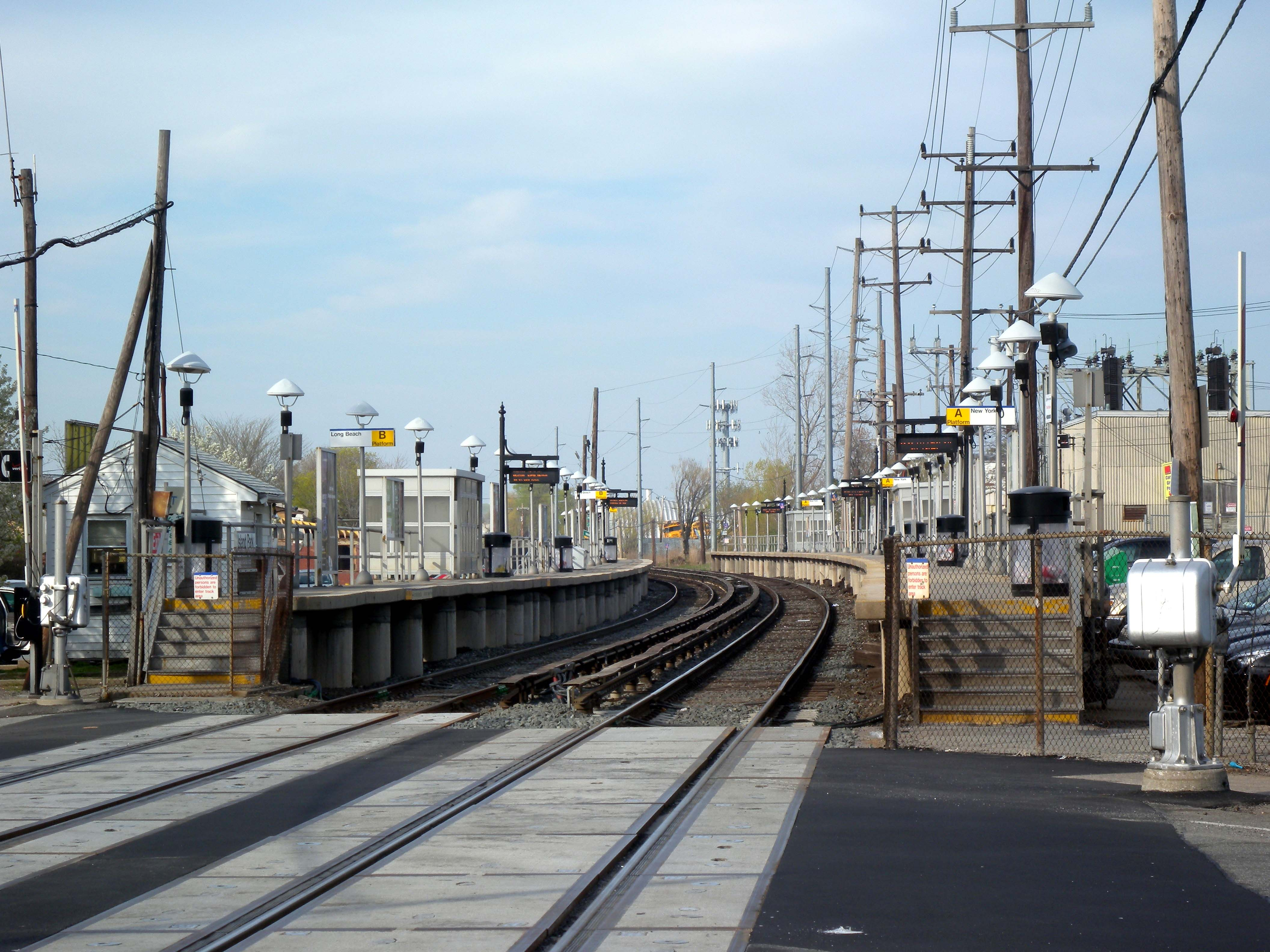
View of both platforms from the Long Beach Road crossing.

The Island Park station was built as a signal stop by the New York and Long Beach Railroad in April 1898 as The Dykes and served as a flag stop during much of the early 20th Century. In 1922, developer Edgewater Smith changed the name of the island from Jekyl Island to Island Park, although the name of the station was not changed until 1924; the previous name replaced the former Jekyl Island station to the north. The existing station building was built in May 1923.

=== Jekyl Island station ===
Jekyll Island station was originally built in 1901 as Barnum Island station on the south side of the northern Long Beach Road grade crossing The station was renamed as Jekyl Island station in 1903, and then renamed "Island Park" station in October 1921. Due to an increase in development on the south side of the island, the station was closed in July 1922 and the name was moved to the site of the old flag stop formerly known as "The Dykes." The site of the former Jekyl Island Station is now occupied by a residential cul-de-sac named D'Amato Drive, which is only accessible from Parente Lane North.

== Station layout ==
This station has two slightly offset high-level side platforms, each 10 cars long. Parking is largely restricted to Island Park residents, with permits issued by the village.
