= Darby Penney =

American activist (1952–2021)

- Born: Darby Jean Penney; December 10, 1952; Oceanside, New York
- Died: October 11, 2021 (aged 68); Albany, New York
- Occupations: Mental health worker, activist

Darby Penney (December 10, 1952 – October 11, 2021) was an American mental health worker and human rights activist working for improvements in psychiatric care.

== Early life ==
Penney was born in Oceanside, New York, the daughter of Arthur Penney and Audrey Stiefel Penney. Her mother was a teacher and her father was a civil engineer. She graduated from Empire State College, and in 1980 earned a master's degree in library science at the University at Albany.

== Career ==
Penney, who identified as a psychiatric survivor, was the first Director of Recipient Affairs at the New York State Office of Mental Health when the position was established in 1992. She was a founding member of the National Association of Consumer/Survivor Mental Health Administrators in 1993. In 1997, she was keynote speaker at a conference of the New Jersey Self-Help Clearinghouse.

As director of historical projects from 2001 to 2003, along with photographer Lisa RInzler and psychiatrist Peter Stastny, Penney worked to preserve and study hundreds of stored suitcases left behind by patients of the defunct Willard Psychiatric Center. Together they created an exhibition, "Lost Cases, Recovered Lives: Suitcases From a State Hospital Attic", which was first mounted in the New York State Museum in 2004, and later the Museum of Disability History in Buffalo. Her book with Stastny based on the project, The Lives They Left Behind, was published in 2009. In 2003, she created another exhibit and a companion video, “Here Lies?: Abandoned Asylum Cemeteries".

Penney was a founding member of International Network for Treatment Alternatives to Recovery (INTAR) in 2004, and was named a fellow of the Petra Foundation in 2005. She was also a fellow at the Alden March Institute for Bioethics, at Albany Medical College. She worked for Advocates for Human Potential, a healthcare consulting firm, was director of the Community Consortium, and was active on the board of the National Association for Rights Protection and Advocacy (NARPA).

== Publications ==
Penney work was published in academic journals, including Public Library Quarterly, Psychiatric Rehabilitation Journal, American Psychologist, Evaluation and Program Planning, and American Journal of Bioethics. She was also a poet; her work was published in several collections. With her husband, she co-founded and co-edited a literary journal, The Snail's Pace Review, and a small press, The Snail's Pace Press.

== Personal life ==
Penney married Kenneth Denberg in 1988. He died in 2018. She died from cancer in 2021, aged 68 years, at a hospice in Albany, New York.
