= Centre Avenue station =

Long Island Rail Road station in Nassau County, New York

Centre Avenue
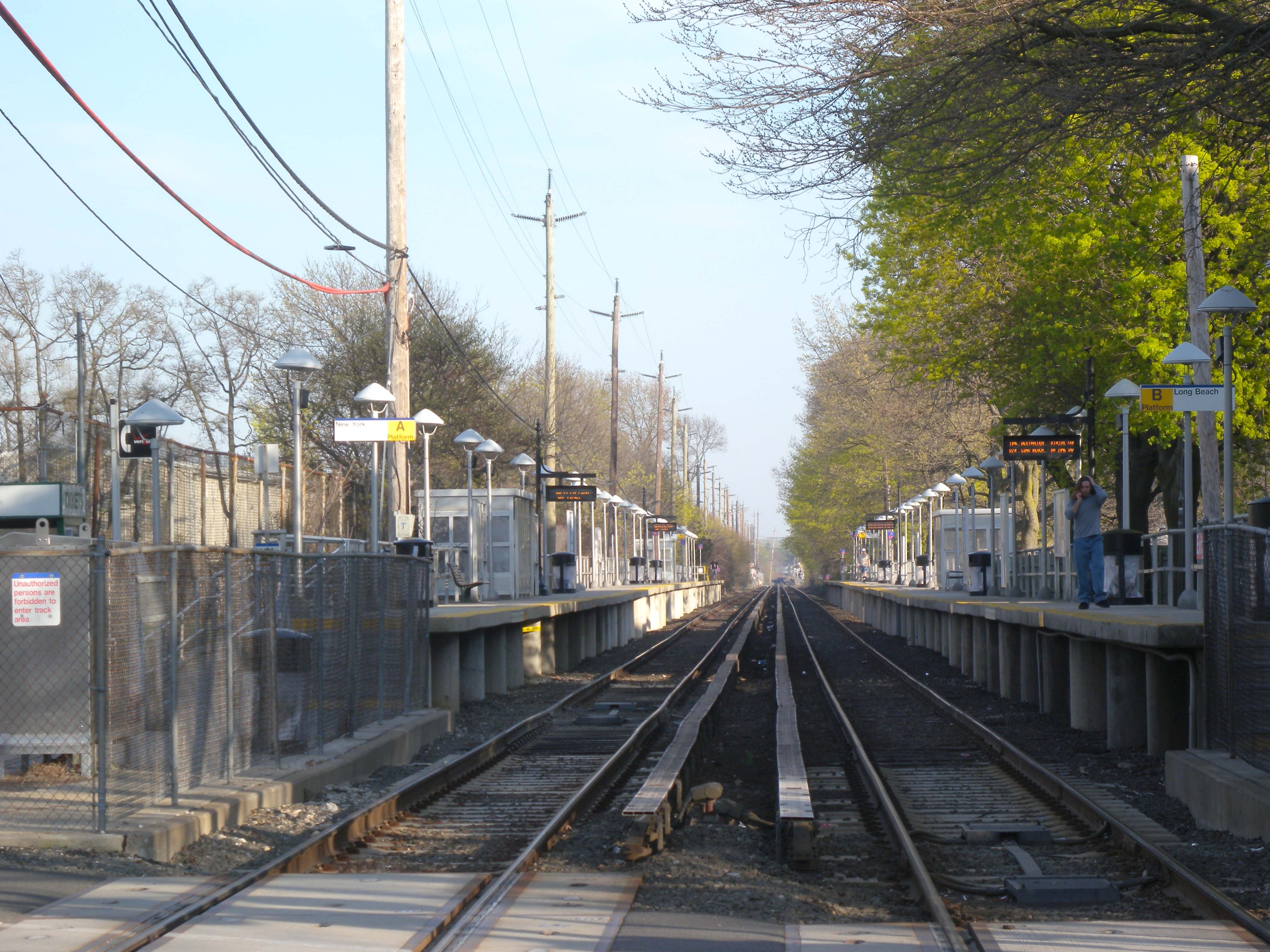
- The Centre Avenue station, looking south

General information
- Location: Centre Avenue & Forest Avenue; East Rockaway, New York
- Coordinates: 40.648272°N 73.663915°W
- Owner: Long Island Rail Road
- Line: Long Beach Branch
- Distance: 2.5 mi (4.0 km) from Valley Stream
- Platforms: 2 side platforms
- Tracks: 2

Construction
- Parking: Yes
- Accessible: Yes

Other information
- Station code: CAV
- Fare zone: 7

History
- Opened: 1898 (NY&LB)
- Electrified: September 1910; 750 V (DC) third rail
- Former names: South Lynbrook (1898–1924)

Passengers
- 2012—2014: 1,460 per weekday

Services
Preceding station	Long Island Rail Road	Following station
Lynbrook toward Penn Station or Grand Central	Long Beach Branch	East Rockaway toward Long Beach
Location

Centre Avenue is one of two Long Island Rail Road stations located within East Rockaway, in Nassau County, New York. The station is officially located at Forest Avenue, between Rocklyn and Centre Avenues – one block east of Atlantic Avenue.

== History ==
The station was opened in 1898 by the New York and Long Beach Railroad and originally was known as South Lynbrook station until 1924.

Centre Avenue station was originally located a block to the west and had a station house, but was moved east when high-level platforms were installed in the late 1960s in order to facilitate the new M1 railcars. Parts of the original platform are still visible along the trackside towards Lynbrook.

Like all other Long Beach Branch stations east & south of Lynbrook, the Centre Avenue station saw temporary service reductions following Hurricane Sandy in 2012, due to the third rail infrastructure being damaged by saltwater from storm surge; diesel trains operated service on the branch until the restoration of electric service, following the completion of repairs to the electrical infrastructure along the branch.

== Station layout ==
The Centre Avenue station has two high-level side platforms, each 10 cars long, with shelters and ticket vending machines; the station is wheelchair-accessible.

=== Parking ===
Parking is available for vehicles with East Rockaway village residential permits and is located one block west, near the site of the former, original station. Limited non-resident parking is also available.

== See also ==
- List of Long Island Rail Road stations
- East Rockaway station
