= Oceanside station =

Oceanside station may refer to:

- Oceanside station (LIRR) in New York, USA
- Oceanside Transit Center in California, USA
