= East Rockaway station =

Long Island Rail Road station in Nassau County, New York

East Rockaway
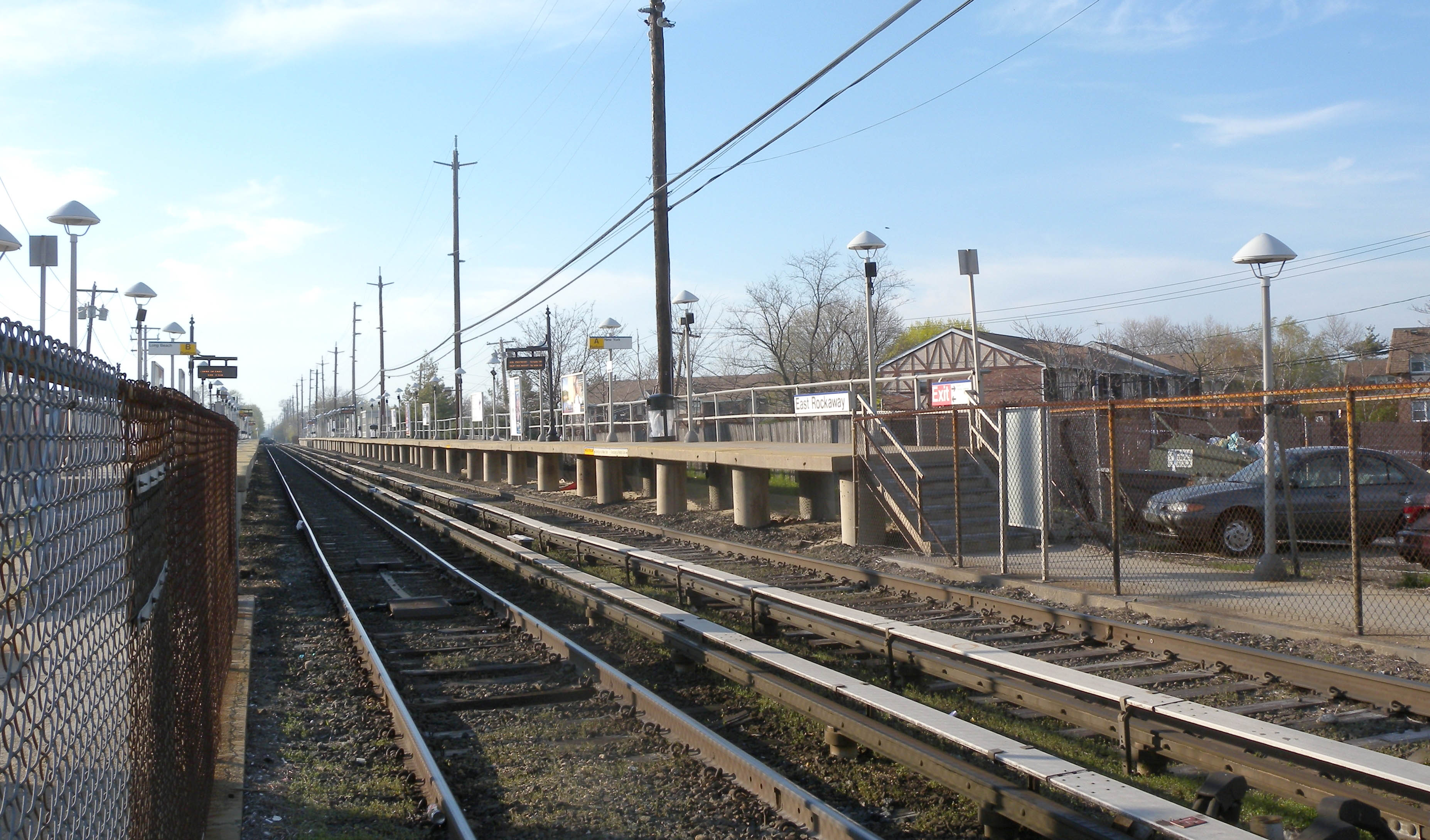
- The East Rockaway station, looking northwest

General information
- Location: Atlantic Avenue & Ocean Avenue; East Rockaway, New York
- Coordinates: 40.640938°N 73.657067°W
- Owner: Long Island Rail Road
- Line: Long Beach Branch
- Distance: 3.0 mi (4.8 km) from Valley Stream
- Platforms: 2 side platforms
- Tracks: 2

Construction
- Parking: Yes
- Accessible: yes

Other information
- Station code: ERY
- Fare zone: 7

History
- Opened: 1880 (NY&LB)
- Rebuilt: 1951
- Electrified: September 1910; 750 V (DC) third rail

Passengers
- 2012—2014: 1,654

Services
Preceding station	Long Island Rail Road	Following station
Centre Avenue toward Penn Station or Grand Central	Long Beach Branch	Oceanside toward Long Beach
Location

East Rockaway is one of two Long Island Rail Road stations located within the Incorporated Village of East Rockaway, in Nassau County, New York. The station is located at Atlantic and Ocean Avenues.

== History ==
The station was established in October 1880 with the opening of the New York and Long Beach Railroad (NY&LB), on the west side of Ocean Avenue and the east side of the tracks, and contained a freight house that was built between October 1 and November 5, 1880. The station became part of the LIRR system in 1909, when the NY&LB merged with the LIRR. The original station house was razed in 1942.

On December 11, 1951, the station was relocated to its current address and combined with the former Atlantic Avenue station.

Access to the NICE n36 bus was available until April 9, 2017.

=== Atlantic Avenue station ===
The Atlantic Avenue station was originally a signal station on the NY&LB dating back to April 1898. It was located just south of Atlantic Avenue on the east side of the tracks, and was discontinued in 1951. However, due to its 1,100 feet (0.34 km) proximity to East Rockaway station, the LIRR was seeking permission from the New York Public Service Commission to eliminate it as far back as November 1912.

== Station layout ==
This station has two high-level side platforms with shelters, each 10 cars long, along with shelters and ticket vending machines. Parking is available on Davison Plaza and in a lot on Ocean Avenue. Parking permits are issued by the Village of East Rockaway.

== See also ==
- List of Long Island Rail Road stations
- Centre Avenue station
