= Oceanside station (LIRR) =

Long Island Rail Road station in Nassau County, New York

Oceanside
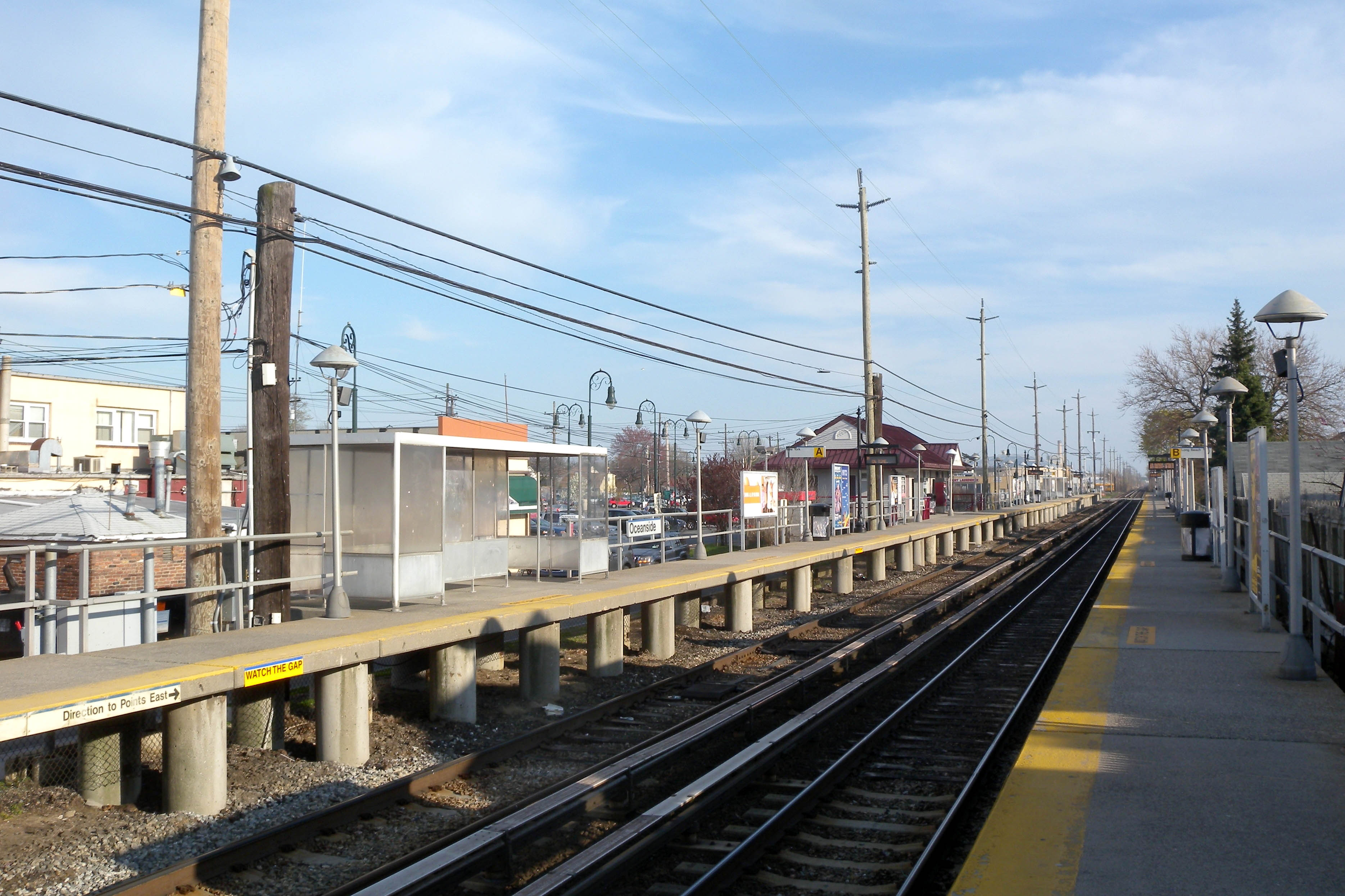
- The platforms at the Oceanside station, with the station house in the distance

General information
- Location: Weidner Avenue & Lawson Boulevard; Oceanside, New York
- Coordinates: 40.634986°N 73.654613°W
- Owner: Long Island Rail Road
- Line: Long Beach Branch
- Distance: 3.5 mi (5.6 km) from Valley Stream
- Platforms: 2 side platforms
- Tracks: 2

Construction
- Parking: Yes
- Cycle facilities: Yes
- Accessible: Yes

Other information
- Station code: ODE
- Fare zone: 7

History
- Opened: 1897 (NY&LB)
- Rebuilt: 1915, 1959, 2002
- Electrified: September 1910; 750 V (DC) third rail

Passengers
- 2012—2014: 3,715 per weekday

Services
Preceding station	Long Island Rail Road	Following station
East Rockaway toward Penn Station or Grand Central	Long Beach Branch	Island Park toward Long Beach
Location

Oceanside is a station on the Long Beach Branch of the Long Island Rail Road. It is located at Weidner Avenue and Lawson Boulevard in Oceanside, New York.

== History ==
Oceanside station opened in 1897 as part of the New York and Long Beach Railroad, which was merged into the LIRR in 1909. The station was rebuilt on May 1, 1915, again in 1959 and once more in 2002.

== Station layout ==
The station has two high-level side platforms, each eight cars long, and is wheelchair-accessible. The station house and parking lot are located east of inbound platform. There are four nearby parking lots, all restricted to residents of Oceanside. Parking permits are issued by the Town of Hempstead.

While a station house exists, it also has sheltered platforms on both sides of the tracks.
