= Susie Fishbein =

American screenwriter

- Born: Susan Beth Fishbein; 1968 (age 57–58); Oceanside, New York
- Known for: Kosher cookbook author

Susan Beth Fishbein (born 1968) is an American Orthodox Jewish kosher cookbook author, cooking teacher, and culinary tour leader. Her Kosher By Design series of cookbooks was a runaway best-seller for ArtScroll, with over 500,000 copies sold. In 2008 she was included on the Forward 50 as one of the 50 most influential Jews.

== Biography ==
Susie Fishbein was born in 1968 in Oceanside, New York. She was raised in a strictly kosher home. She earned an MA in science education and taught fourth-grade science in a public school for four years.

In 2000 she co-edited The Kosher Palette: Easy and elegant modern kosher cooking, a 308-page hardcover, spiral-bound, community cookbook produced as a fundraising tool for the Joseph Kushner Hebrew Academy of Livingston, New Jersey, where her first child was a student. The book went through four printings comprising 36,000 copies from April 2000 to December 2001.

After this project, Fishbein sought to upgrade her cooking knowledge by taking lessons and collecting recipes from professional chefs. Professing an interest in bringing to the kosher cookbook market "something like what Martha Stewart does – meals that are easy to prepare, and elegant and healthful, and that appeal to all the senses", she assembled the team of Renee Errich, a Manhattan event planner, to choreograph table settings, Larry Sexton, florist at the Plaza Hotel, to provide flower-arranging tips, and John Uher, a professional food and lifestyle magazine photographer, to direct the photo shoots for a new kosher cookbook titled Kosher By Design. This team continued to work with her on subsequent books, along with other experts such as Bonnie Taub-Dix, spokeswoman for the American Diabetic Association (the nutrition consultant on Kosher By Design Lightens Up) and kosher caterer Moshe David (who contributed many recipes for the Passover cookbook Passover By Design).

=== Kosher By Design ===
Between 2003 and 2016, Fishbein produced nine cookbooks in the Kosher By Design series. The Kosher By Design series combines elegant yet easy-to-prepare kosher recipes approved by two rabbis with full-color glossy photographs to appeal to the growing segment of American Jewish women with disposable income who want to produce contemporary kosher fare. Fishbein put a new spin on kosher and Jewish holiday classics with her creative recipes, such as Tri-Colored Matzah Balls, Challah Napkin Rings, and Beer-Braised Brisket. Though her recipes sport exotic names such as Broccoli and Almond Bisque, Pecan Crusted Grouper over Amaretto Whipped Potatoes, Kalamata and Mustard Crusted Roast Beef, Sweet Potato Wedges with Vanilla Rum Sauce, and Chocolate Mint Dalmatian Cookies, Fishbein emphasizes the use of simple ingredients that can be found in any supermarket and markets herself as an "everyday cook".

In addition to recipes, Fishbein's books feature sample table settings and floral arrangements, party themes, wine lists, and explanations of Jewish traditions and kashrut laws which are an educational aid for non-Orthodox readers.

In media interviews, Fishbein explains that her recipes aren't necessarily "Jewish", but they are all kosher. She claims that her popularity is even greater among Conservative and Reform Jewish women who do not have a kosher kitchen but are interested in cooking gourmet. ArtScroll has realized the books' saleability by extending beyond its traditional Orthodox Jewish market into the mainstream market, including sales on Amazon.com, at Barnes & Noble and Christian evangelical booksellers, in Williams Sonoma stores, and in supermarkets.

In 2016, Fishbein announced that the ninth book in the series, Kosher By Design Brings It Home, would be the last.

=== Media personality ===
Concurrent with her cookbook career, Fishbein developed a public career as a celebrity chef with cooking demonstrations at Jewish benefits, bake sales, kosher cruises, and food festivals, appearing before a new or repeat audience almost every week. She has also appeared nationally on The Today Show, Living It Up! With Ali & Jack, Martha Stewart Living Radio, and the Nachum Segal Show, earning her the sobriquets of "the Jewish Martha Stewart" and the "kosher diva". She has become the darling of the Jewish media, which quotes her and her recipes in pre-holiday features and lauds her easygoing and gracious personality.

The kosher industry that Fishbein rode to stardom used her success to help promote its own products. At the 21st Annual Kosherfest 2009 in the Meadowlands Exposition Center in Secaucus, for example, Fishbein held a book-signing at the Kolatin Real Kosher Gelatin booth and produced a complete dessert recipe supplement based exclusively on the new gelatin product.

=== Cooking coach ===
In addition to her cooking demos, Fishbein has led "culinary tours" to Israel, Europe, and other destinations. She will serve as a cooking instructor for two girls camps at a soon-to-be-opened $150,000 culinary center being constructed to her specifications by the New Jersey Y.

== Family ==
Fishbein lives with her husband Kalman, three daughters, and one son in Livingston, New Jersey.

== Bibliography ==
- The Kosher Palette: Easy and elegant modern kosher cooking. Joseph Kushner Hebrew Academy. 2000. ISBN 0-9676638-0-6. (co-edited with Sandra Blank)
- Kosher By Design: Picture-perfect food for the holidays & every day. Mesorah Publications, Ltd. ISBN 1-57819-707-4. 1st edition 2003, 2nd edition 2005
- Kosher by Design Entertains: Fabulous recipes for parties and every day. Mesorah Publications, Ltd. 2005. ISBN 1-57819-447-4.
- Kosher By Design: Kids in the Kitchen. Mesorah Publications, Ltd. 2005. ISBN 1-57819-071-1.
- Kosher by Design: Short on Time – Fabulous food faster. Mesorah Publications, Ltd. 2006. ISBN 1-57819-072-X. (with John Uher)
- Passover by Design: Picture-perfect Kosher by Design recipes for the holiday. Mesorah Publications, Ltd. 2008. ISBN 978-1-57819-073-7. (with John Uher)
- Kosher by Design Lightens Up: Fabulous food for a healthier lifestyle. Mesorah Publications, Ltd. 2008. ISBN 978-1-57819-117-8. (with Bonnie Taub-Dix)
- Kosher by Design: Teens & 20-Somethings. Mesorah Publications, Ltd. 2010. ISBN 978-1-4226-0998-9.
- Kosher By Design Cooking Coach. Mesorah Publications, Ltd. 2012. ISBN 978-1-4226-1309-2.
- Kosher by Design Brings it Home: Picture-perfect Food Inspired by My Travels. Mesorah Publications, Ltd. 2016. ISBN 978-1-4226-1689-5.
