= Ann Dryden Witte =

American economist

Ann Dryden Witte (born August 28, 1942) is an American economist, known for her work on "a variety of interesting and eclectic problems" and as a "prolific author of books, monographs, and professional articles". She is a professor emerita of economics at Wellesley College, and a research associate of the National Bureau of Economic Research.

== Education and career ==
Ann Dryden was born in Oceanside, New York, the daughter of a husband-wife team that ran a used machinery business on Long Island. She graduated from the University of Florida in 1963, majoring in political science and history, and earned a master's degree in economics at Columbia University in 1965. In 1969, as a graduate student at North Carolina State University, she married Charles Leo Witte. She completed her Ph.D. in 1971 in economics, with a minor in oceanography. Her dissertation was Employment in the Manufacturing Sector of Developing Economies: A Study of Mexico, Peru and Venezuela. During this time she worked as an economic and systems analyst in the federal government from 1963 to 1967, and then as an instructor at Tougaloo College and North Carolina State University.

After finishing her doctorate, she joined the faculty at the University of North Carolina, where she remained until 1985. She became an associate of the National Bureau of Economic Research in 1984, and moved from North Carolina to Wellesley in 1985. In 1987 and 1988 she also held a position as Fellow in Law and Economics at the Harvard Law School.

She chaired the Child Care Policy Research Consortium from 1999 to 2000.

== Books ==
Witte is the author or coauthor of:

- Taxpayer Compliance: An Agenda for Research (with Jeffrey A. Roth and John T. Scholz, University of Pennsylvania Press, 1989)
- Predicting Recidivism Using Survival Models (with Peter Schmidt, Springer-Verlag, 1988)
- An Economic Analysis of Crime and Justice: Theory, Methods, and Applications (with Peter Schmidt, Academic Press, 1984)
- Beating the System: The Underground Economy (with Carl Simon, Auburn House, 1982)

She is also a co-author on several book-length government reports.

== Recognition ==
Witte is a fellow of the American Society of Criminology, the American Statistical Association, and the Royal Statistical Society.
