= Evaluation and Program Planning =

- Discipline: Social science
- Language: English
- Edited by: Mita Marra

Publication details
- History: 1974–present
- Publisher: Elsevier
- Frequency: Bimonthly
- Impact factor: 1.240 (2018)

Standard abbreviations
- ISO 4: Eval. Program Plan.

Indexing
- CODEN: EPPLDO
- ISSN: 0149-7189 (print); 1873-7870 (web)
- LCCN: 78643732
- OCLC no.: 905454170

Links
- Journal homepage; Online access; Online archive

Evaluation and Program Planning is a bimonthly peer-reviewed multidisciplinary social science journal covering program evaluation. It was established in 1974 by Jonathan A. Morell and Eugenie Walsh Flaherty and originally published by Pergamon Press. It is currently published by Elsevier (which acquired Pergamon Press) and the editor-in-chief is Mita Marra (University of Naples Federico II). According to the Journal Citation Reports, the journal has a 2018 impact factor of 1.240.
