= Long Beach Branch =

Long Island Rail Road branch

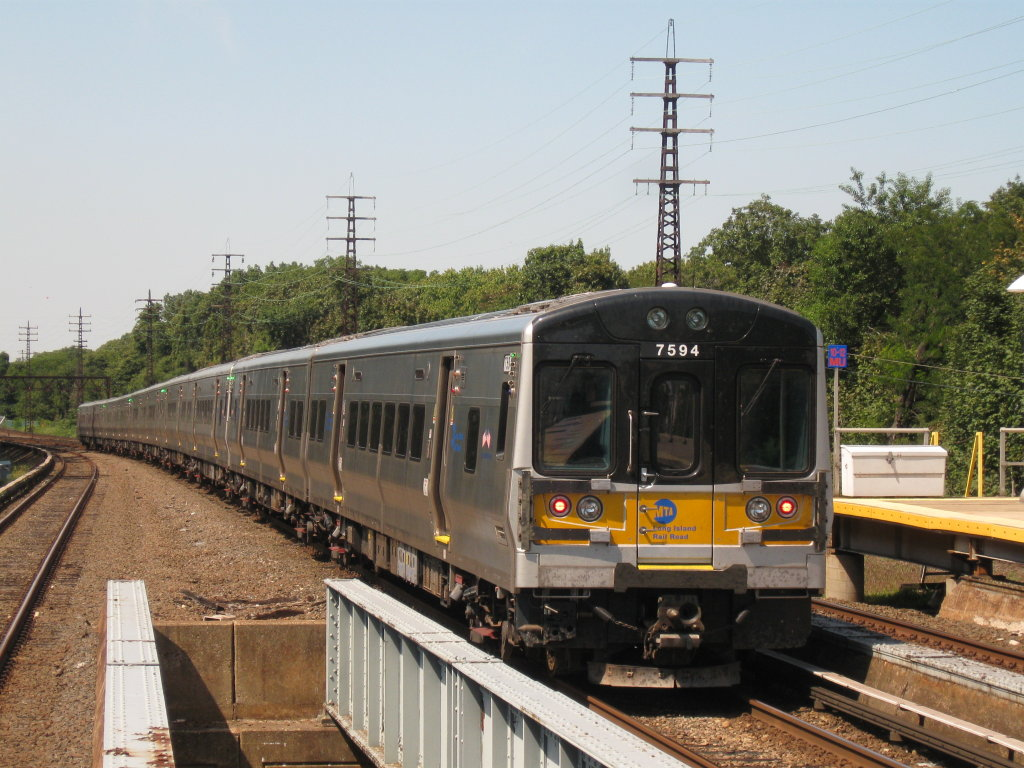
- Long Beach Branch train #853 departs Lynbrook en route to Penn Station

Overview
- Status: Operational
- Owner: Long Island Rail Road Company
- Locale: Nassau County, New York, USA
- Termini: Valley Interlocking; Long Beach
- Stations: 10

Service
- Type: Commuter rail
- System: Long Island Rail Road
- Services: Long Beach Branch
- Operator: Metropolitan Transportation Authority
- Rolling stock: Budd M3; Bombardier M7; Kawasaki M9
- Ridership: 3,629,225 (annual ridership, 2025)

History
- Opened: 1880 (NY&LB)

Technical
- Line length: 8.8 mi (14.2 km)
- Number of tracks: 1-2
- Character: At-grade
- Track gauge: 4 ft 8 1/2 in (1,435 mm) standard gauge
- Electrification: Third rail, 750 V DC
Route map
- Distances shown from Atlantic Terminal

The Long Beach Branch is an electrified rail line and service owned and operated by the Long Island Rail Road in the U.S. state of New York. The branch begins at Valley Interlocking, just east of Valley Stream station, where it merges with the Far Rockaway Branch to continue west as the Atlantic Branch. East from there the Long Beach Branch parallels the Montauk Branch to Lynbrook station, where it turns south toward Long Beach station. Trains operating on the Long Beach Branch continue west of Valley Stream via the Atlantic Branch to Jamaica station, with most continuing on to Grand Central or Penn Station in Midtown Manhattan. In 2018, the branch recorded an annual ridership of 4,849,085 based on ticket sales, down 1% from 2017.

== History ==
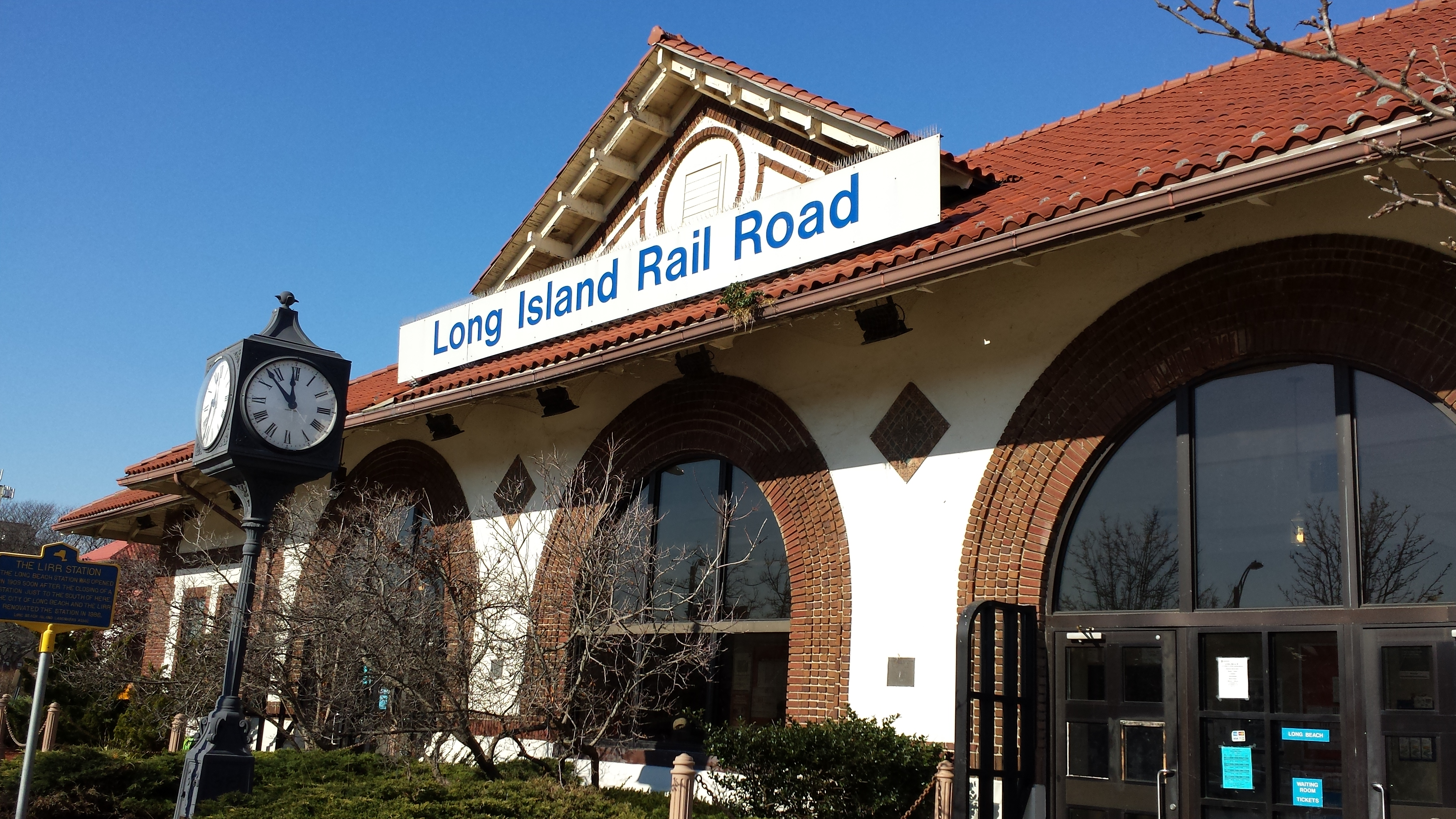
The station house at Long Beach, which opened in 1909 and was designed by Kenneth M. Murchison.

=== Origins ===
The Long Beach Branch began as the New York and Long Beach Railroad (NY&LB) Company, operating from Lynbrook to Long Beach in 1880. The railroad's original southern terminus was along the Atlantic Ocean. The LIRR, which had just recently been acquired by entrepreneur Austin Corbin, operated the NY&LB from its inception until 1904, when it was merged with the other lines of the LIRR. At Lynbrook, trains continued west to Hunters Point, Queens, operating on tracks built by the South Side Railroad of Long Island (which had merged with the LIRR prior to the NY&LB service). In 1909, Long Beach station was moved 1,000 feet (300 m) north from the oceanfront to Reynolds Channel, where it remains today.

A five-mile (8 km) extension to Point Lookout, New York owned by the Long Beach Marine Railway Company existed between 1881 and 1895. The LIRR bought the line in 1886 and continued to operate passenger service until 1895.

=== Pennsylvania Railroad ownership ===
The LIRR had planned to extend the Atlantic Branch north into Manhattan to meet the New York Central Railroad (NYCRR) at what is now Grand Central Terminal, while at the same time, NYCRR competitor Pennsylvania Railroad was planning to build a tunnel to a new Manhattan terminal from New Jersey. Following negotiations, the Pennsylvania Railroad (PRR) acquired a majority stake of the LIRR in 1900, allowing the railroads to jointly build the New York Tunnel Extension and share a Manhattan terminal at Pennsylvania Station, which opened in 1910. Also in 1910, the Long Beach Branch was extended westward from Lynbrook to Valley Stream, further integrating it with the LIRR Atlantic Branch and the PRR's new Manhattan terminal. The line was double-tracked from Valley Stream to Lynbrook in late 1910, then from East Rockaway to Wreck Lead ("WL") on January 15, 1927. Electrification of the main tracks from Valley Stream to Long Beach was finished in September 1910, with the freight sidings being electrified between 1928 and 1930. This upgrade coincided with the PRR's electrification and grade separation of multiple suburban lines. Color light signals were installed in January 1927; they were later replaced by PRR-style position light signals.

=== MTA takeover ===
On January 20, 1965, the State of New York announced its intentions to purchase the LIRR from the PRR. The LIRR was to be operated by the newly-formed Metropolitan Commuter Transportation Authority, today's current MTA. The MTA began operating new M1 electric coaches in 1968, which resulted in the upgrading of every station on the line to high-level platforms.

The Long Beach Branch's familiar orange color scheme ( ) was first implemented on May 20, 1974, as part of the MTA's Form 8 timetable.

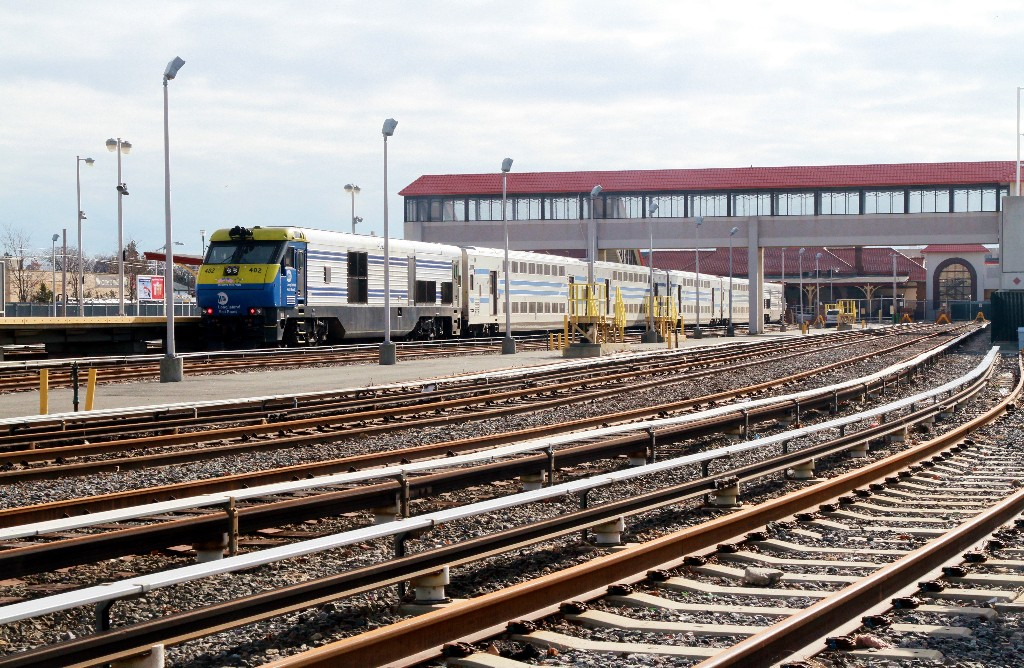
Diesel-powered shuttle train at Long Beach in November 2012

=== Hurricane Sandy and infrastructure modernization ===
Hurricane Sandy struck Long Island on October 29–30, 2012, and the Long Beach Branch was the most seriously affected of all the LIRR lines despite a full systemwide shutdown on October 29. Third rail power was lost, as three of the four substations on the line were knocked out. The line between Island Park and Long Beach was strewn with debris, and switch motors at Long Beach station, along with other signal and communications components on the line, were rendered inoperative due to immersion in salt water. Bus service began between Lynbrook and Island Park on November 7. Partial rail service was restored on November 14, when a diesel-operated shuttle began operating between Lynbrook and Long Beach on a modified weekday schedule. Connecting electric service was available at Lynbrook and shuttle buses were operated on weekends and Thanksgiving in place of train service. Full electric service, initially not expected to return until January 2013, was restored much earlier than anticipated, on November 25, 2012.

The total cost of post-Sandy restoration projects on the branch is expected to cost $68.6 million and be completed by September 2021. The projects also include the raising of the Oceanside, Oil City, and Long Beach substations 15 feet (4.6 m) off the ground and an emergency generator for the Wreck Lead Bridge over Reynolds Channel.

Positive train control, a federally-mandated technology to improve railroad safety, was implemented on the line on October 30, 2019.

== Stations ==
Zone	Station	Miles (km) from Atlantic Terminal	Date opened	Date closed	Connections / notes
For continuing service to Jamaica and points west, see Atlantic Branch
3	Locust Manor	12.2 (19.6)	1869		Long Island Rail Road: ■ Far Rockaway Branch; New York City Bus: Q3, Q85, Q89, QM21
3	Laurelton	13.1 (21.1)	1907		Long Island Rail Road: ■ Far Rockaway Branch; New York City Bus: Q77, Q85, Q89
3	Rosedale	14.0 (22.5)	1870		Long Island Rail Road: ■ Far Rockaway Branch; New York City Bus: Q5, Q85, Q86, Q89, QM63
4	Valley Stream	15.7 (25.3)	1869		Long Island Rail Road: ■ Far Rockaway Branch; Nassau Inter-County Express: n1, Elmont Flexi
Zone	Station	Miles (km) from Valley Junction	Date opened	Date closed	Connections / notes
4	Lynbrook	1.5 (2.4)	1867		Long Island Rail Road: ■ Babylon Branch; Nassau Inter-County Express: n4, n25, n31, n32 Originally Pearsall's Corners, then Pearsall's
7	Centre Avenue	2.4 (3.9)	1898		Originally South Lynbrook
7	East Rockaway	2.9 (4.7)	1880		
7	Atlantic Avenue		1898	1951	
7	Oceanside	3.4 (5.5)	1897		
7	Barnum Island Channel Bridge				
7	Jekyl Island		1901	1922	Originally named Barnum Island, then Island Park
7	Island Park	5.9 (9.5)	1898		Nassau Inter-County Express: n15 Originally The Dykes
7	Wreck Lead Bridge				
7	Wreck Lead		1888	1927	
7	Queenswater		1898	1936	Originally Inner Beach, then Queenswater
7	Club House		1898	1909	
7	Long Beach	6.9 (11.1)	1880		Nassau Inter-County Express: n15, n33 Long Beach Bus: Point Lookout, East Loop, West End Route, Shoppers Special
