= Lynbrook station =

Long Island Rail Road station in Nassau County, New York

Lynbrook
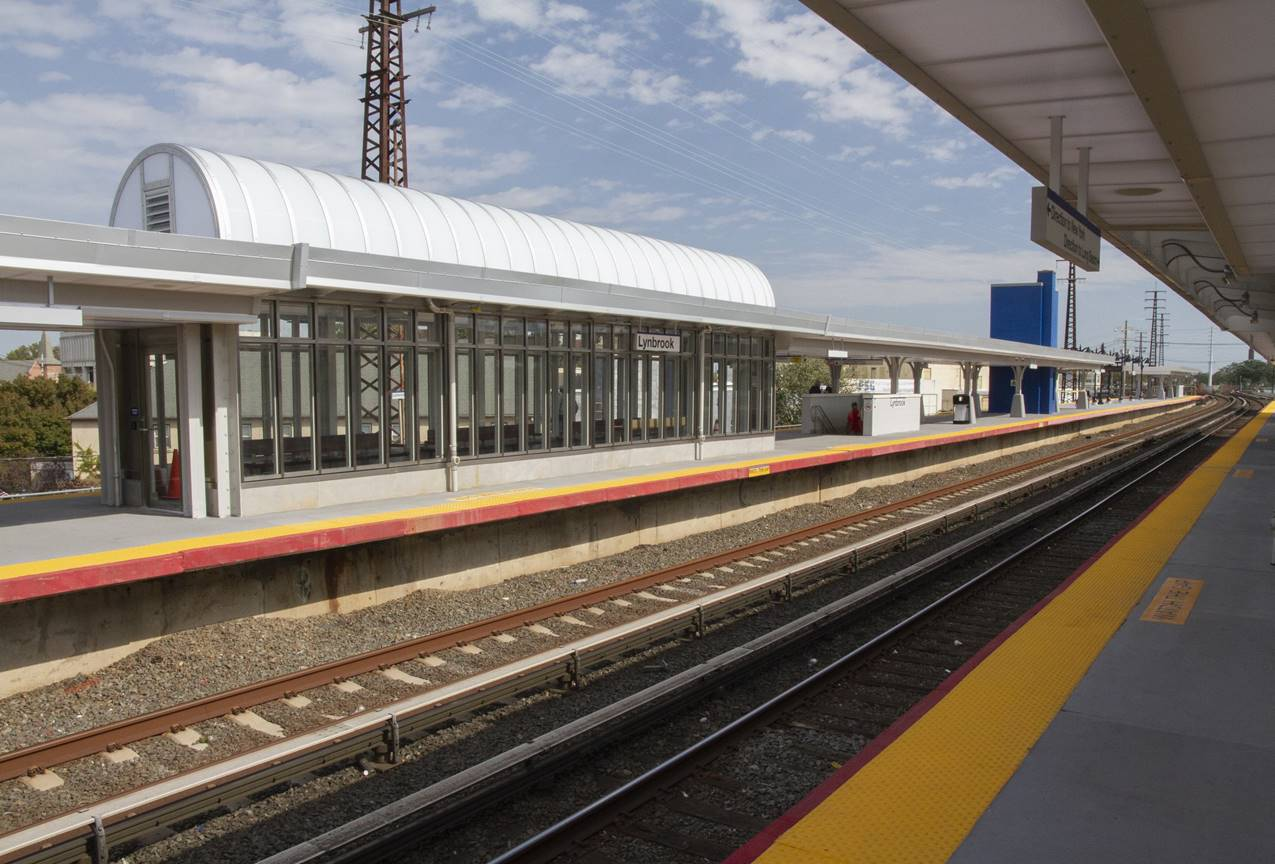
- The Lynbrook station, as seen in October 2020

General information
- Location: Sunrise Highway & Peninsula Boulevard; Village of Lynbrook, New York
- Coordinates: 40.65603°N 73.6758°W
- Owner: Long Island Rail Road
- Lines: Montauk Branch; Long Beach Branch
- Distance: 1.6 mi (2.6 km) from Valley Stream; 17.7 mi (28.5 km) from Long Island City
- Platforms: 2 island platforms
- Tracks: 2 (Long Beach Branch), 2 (Babylon Branch)
- Connections: Nassau Inter-County Express: n4, n4X, n25, n31, n31X, n32, MINI

Construction
- Parking: Yes
- Cycle facilities: Yes
- Accessible: Yes

Other information
- Station code: LYN
- Fare zone: 4

History
- Opened: October 28, 1867; 158 years ago (SSRRLI)
- Rebuilt: 1881, 1920, 1938, 2018–2021
- Electrified: September 8, 1910; 750 V (DC) third rail
- Former names: Pearsall's Corners (1867 – April 1875); Pearsall's (1875 – 1893)

Passengers
- 2012—2014: 9,536 per weekday
- Rank: 22 of 125

Services
Preceding station	Long Island Rail Road	Following station
Jamaica toward Penn Station, Grand Central or Atlantic Terminal	Babylon Branch	Rockville Centre toward Babylon
Valley Stream toward Penn Station or Grand Central	Long Beach Branch	Centre Avenue toward Long Beach
Montauk Branch does not stop here
Former services
Preceding station	Long Island Rail Road	Following station
Valley Stream toward Long Island City	Montauk Division	Rockville Centre toward Montauk
Terminus	Long Beach Branch	Centre Avenue toward Long Beach
Location

Lynbrook is a commuter train station on the Montauk Branch and Long Beach Branch of the Long Island Rail Road, located at the intersection of Sunrise Highway (NY 27) and Peninsula Boulevard (CR 2) in Lynbrook, Nassau County, New York. It is served by Long Beach Branch trains and select Babylon Branch trains.

The station is elevated and is wheelchair accessible through elevator access.

== History ==
Lynbrook was opened as Pearsall's Corner on October 28, 1867, by the South Side Railroad of Long Island. The name became Pearsall's in April 1875 and later became Lynbrook in 1893. In 1880, the station became the northern terminus of the New York and Long Beach Railroad (NY&LB), a railroad line that was acquired by the LIRR and became the Long Beach Branch in 1904. The "PT Tower" opened alongside the NY&LB, controlled the junction with the Montauk Branch until 1910, when Long Beach Branch tracks were extended to Valley Stream station.

The station was rebuilt in 1881, electrified on September 8, 1910, and then remodeled sometime in 1920. This second station was razed in 1938, as part of a decades-long grade crossing elimination project along the Montauk and Atlantic Branches.

The third and current, elevated station opened on October 18, 1938. It is located approximately 1,113 feet (339 m) west of the location of the earlier two versions of the station.

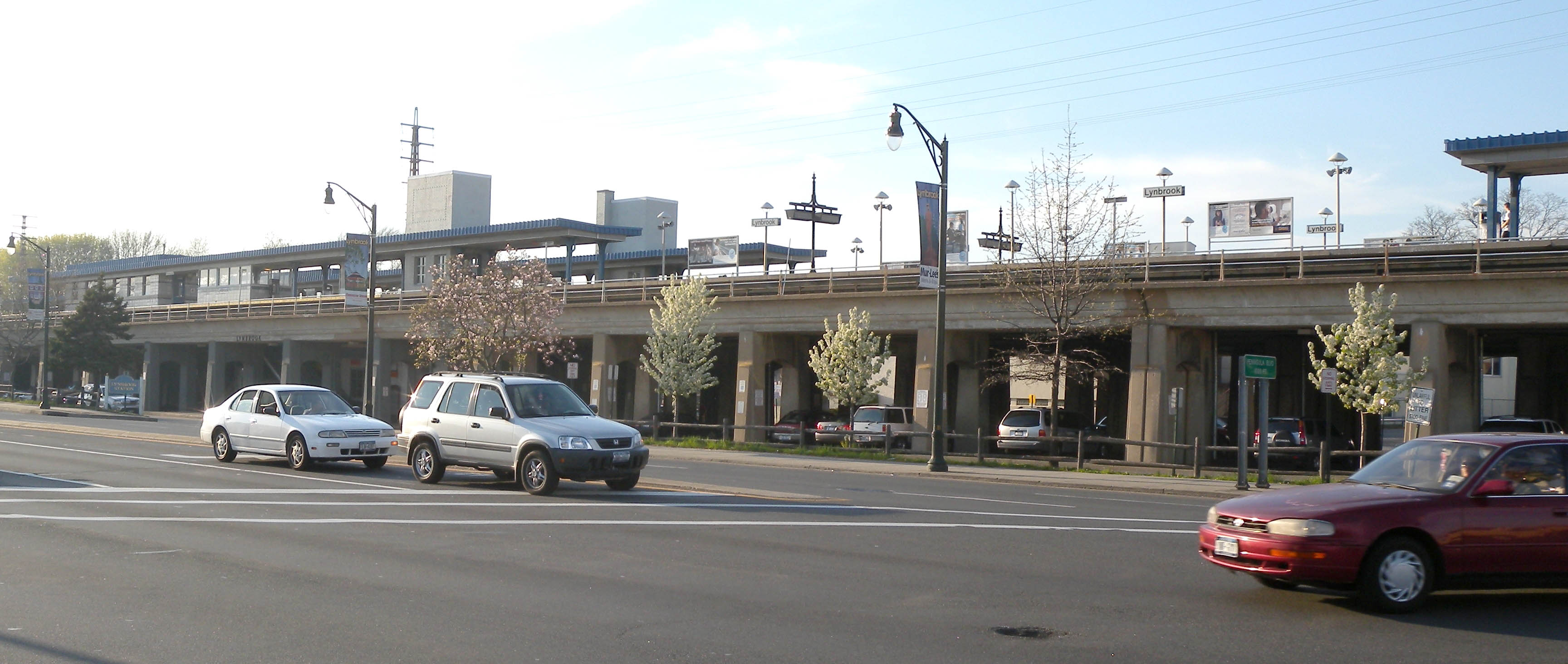
The station, as seen from Sunrise Highway

Between 2018 and 2020, the station underwent an extensive, multi-phase modernization project. The $17.9-million project included improved signage, new platforms & platform canopies, new fixtures, improved stairs & elevators, LED lighting, Wi-Fi, rebuilding the waiting rooms to be more modern & bright, installing new artwork, and otherwise rehabilitating the station & track infrastructure into a state of good repair. Although the station initially was not slated for a modernization project, MTA officials decided to undertake the multi-phase project due to the number of complaints from passengers regarding station conditions; at the time, the Lynbrook station was reported to be in a state of disrepair. The first phase of the project – the rehabilitation & modernization of the station – was completed in 2020. Phase 2 of the project, which included the rehabilitation of the concrete viaduct carrying the elevated tracks and on which the station is located, was completed in 2021.

== Station layout ==
This station has two high-level island platforms. The 12-car north platform is served by Babylon Branch trains, while the 10-car south platform is served by Long Beach Branch trains. The pairs of tracks diverge just east of the station.

== See also ==
- List of Long Island Rail Road stations
