= Long Beach station (LIRR) =

Long Island Rail Road station in Nassau County, New York

Long Beach
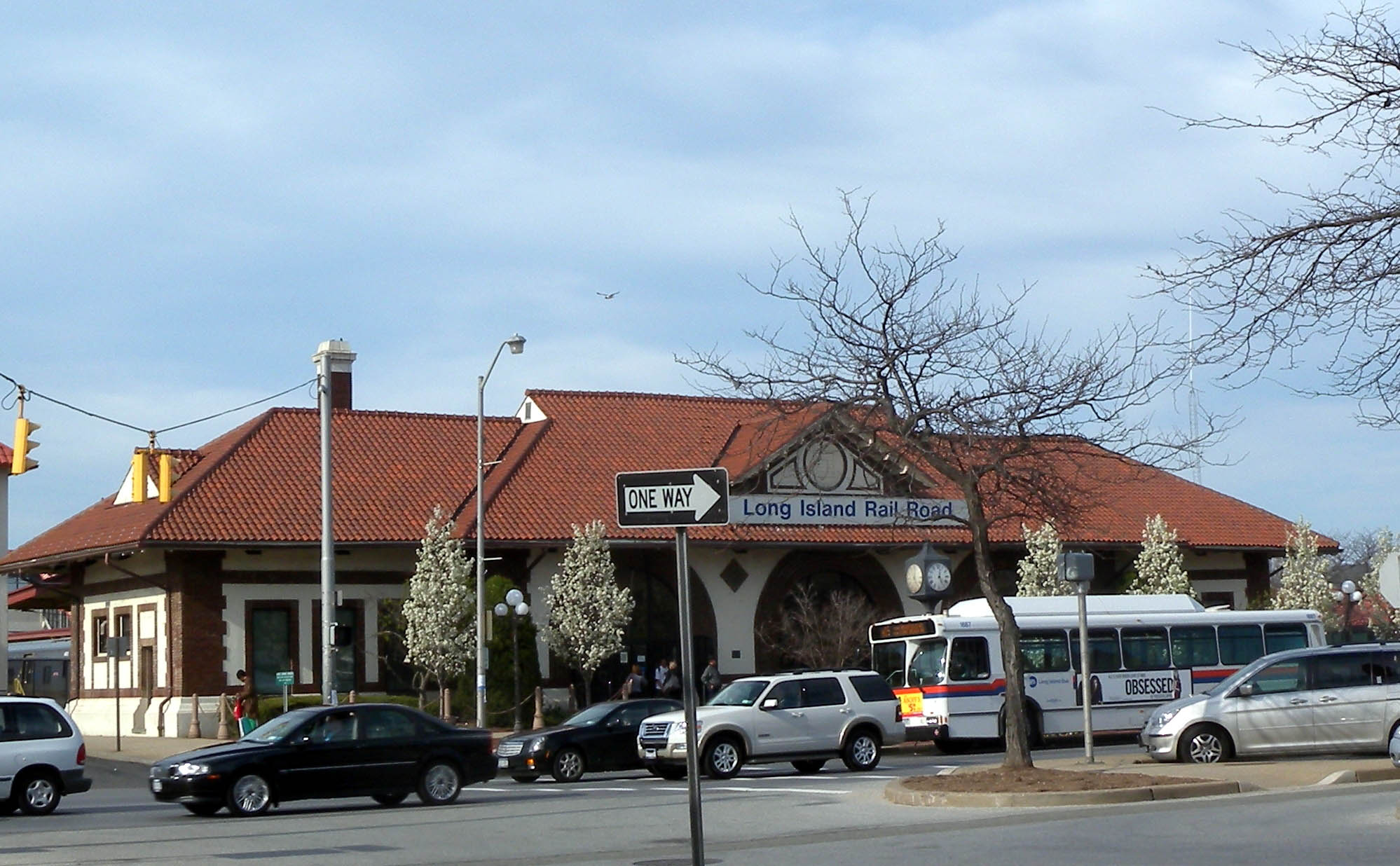
- The restored 1909-built Long Beach Station

General information
- Location: Park Avenue & Park Place; Long Beach, New York
- Coordinates: 40.589368°N 73.664854°W
- Owner: Long Island Rail Road
- Line: Long Beach Branch
- Distance: 7.0 mi (11.3 km) from Valley Stream
- Platforms: 2 island platforms
- Tracks: 10
- Connections: Long Beach Bus: Pt. Lookout, East Loop, West Loop, Shopper's Special (West & East), Late Night Express; Nassau Inter-County Express: n15, n33

Construction
- Parking: Yes
- Cycle facilities: Yes
- Accessible: yes

Other information
- Station code: LBH
- Fare zone: 7

History
- Opened: 1880 (NY&LB)
- Rebuilt: June 1909 (current site); 1988
- Electrified: September 1910; 750 V (DC) third rail

Passengers
- 2012—2014: 9,397 per weekday

Services
Preceding station	Long Island Rail Road	Following station
Island Park toward Penn Station or Grand Central	Long Beach Branch	Terminus
Former services
Preceding station	Long Island Rail Road	Following station
Queenswater toward Lynbrook	Long Beach Branch	Terminus
Location

The Long Beach station is an intermodal center and the terminus of the Long Beach Branch of the Long Island Rail Road. It is located at Park Place and Park Avenue in the City of Long Beach, New York, serving as the city's major transportation hub.

The MTA offers a package which includes train fare and admission to the beach.

== History ==
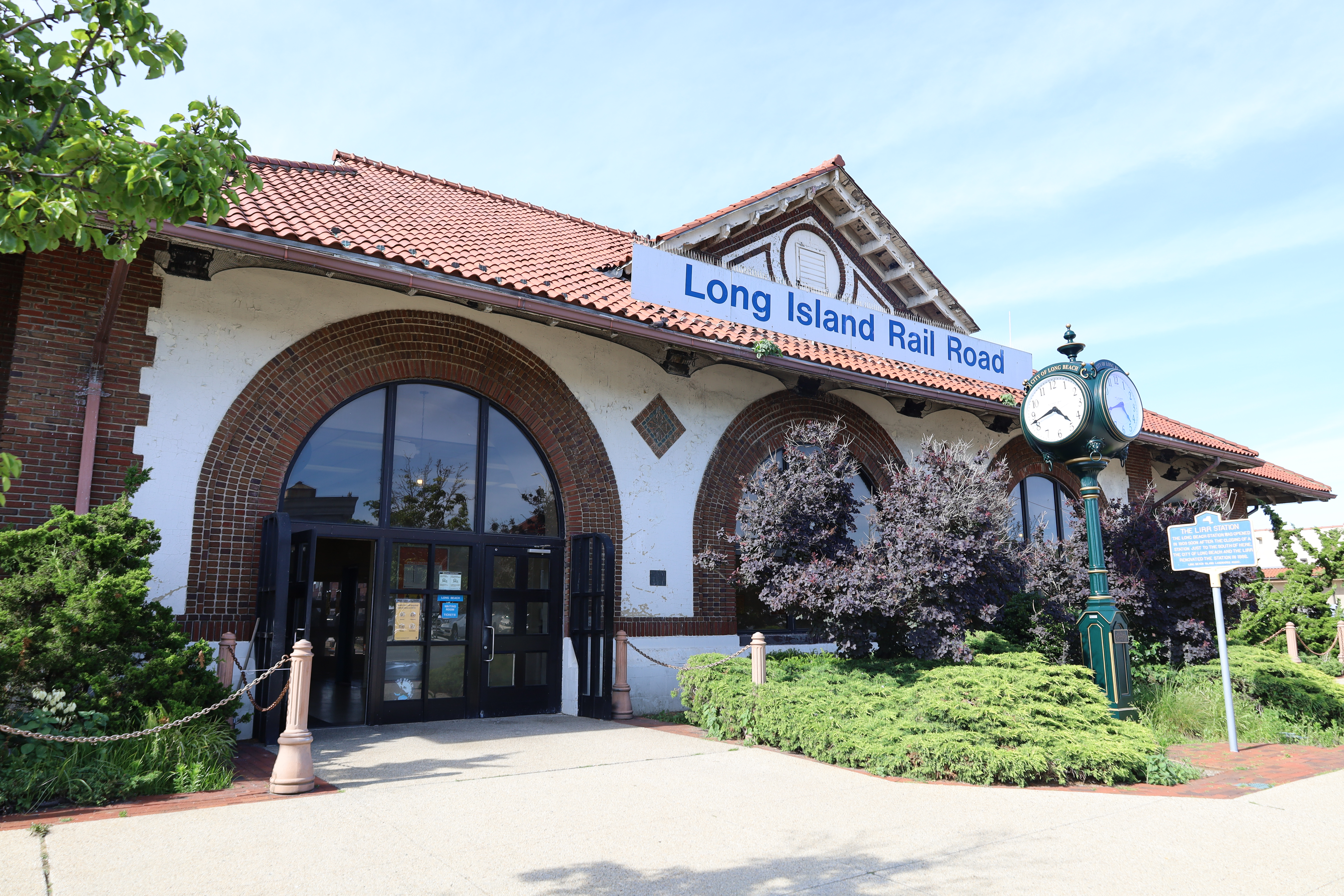
Front of the station in 2021

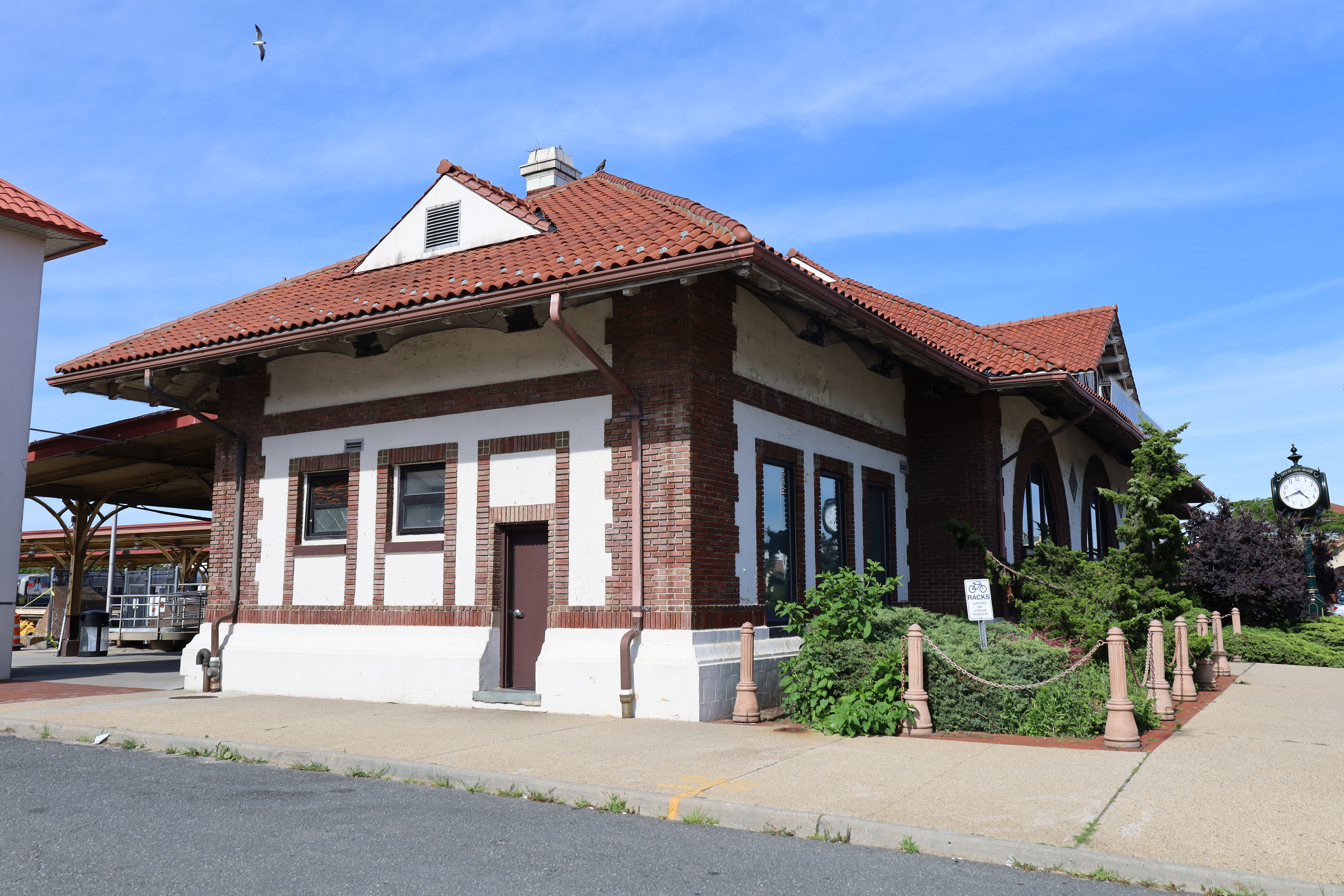
Side of the station in 2021

Long Beach station was originally built in 1880 by the New York and Long Beach Railroad, however it was much closer to the Atlantic Ocean than the present station. The site was surrounded by Broadway, Penn Street, Edwards Boulevard and Riverside Boulevard, and served the grand Long Beach Hotel, which Austin Corbin claimed was the world's largest hotel. It also included a clock tower on the station house, a water tower, and a gazebo. Additionally, it had a connection to the Long Beach Marine Railway, which served Lido Beach and Point Lookout. The hotel burned down on July 27, 1907 in what was officially ruled as an electrical fire.

Due to repeated storm damage to rails and other equipment, the LIRR petitioned the New York State Public Service Commission to move the station 1000 feet north in January 1909, which was fully endorsed by the Estates of Long Beach who even offered to exchange land with the railroad. That permission was granted in February of the same year. The present depot at Park Avenue was built in June 1909, and is larger than the previous station off the Atlantic Coast. It was designed by Kenneth M. Murchison, who also designed the 1913-built Jamaica station and Hoboken Terminal. Over a year later, the station and the line were electrified. The station also included a baggage house and express freight office along track number 10. Beginning in the early 1960s, store fronts began operating in front of the station along the street and continued to do so until the station was renovated in 1988. Another renovation in the early 2000s added a parking garage, bus depot, and platform bridge. The bus depot is on Centre Street adjacent to the station building, and the parking garage contains a section for bicycles.

=== Long Beach Club House station ===
Prior to the relocation, another station named Club House station (not to be confused with the Club House station on the Montauk Branch in Great River, New York) existed nearby at what is today Market Street and National Boulevard. Originally a signal stop built in April 1898, it contained a path leading to a club house on the coast of Reynolds Channel. The station was closed in 1909 when Long Beach Station was moved to the channel.

== Station layout ==
This station has two high-level island platforms. The east platform between Tracks 3 and 4 is 10 cars long. The west platform between Tracks 5 and 6 is eight cars long. There are 10 tracks total. The six tracks not next to the platforms (two to the east of the station and four to the west) are used for train storage. A low-level island platform between Tracks 7 and 8 is not in service, but contains mini-high platforms to access high-level trains.

Parking is available to the east and west of the station platforms, and is largely restricted to permits issued by the city of Long Beach.
