= Reynolds Channel =

Strait in Nassau County, New York

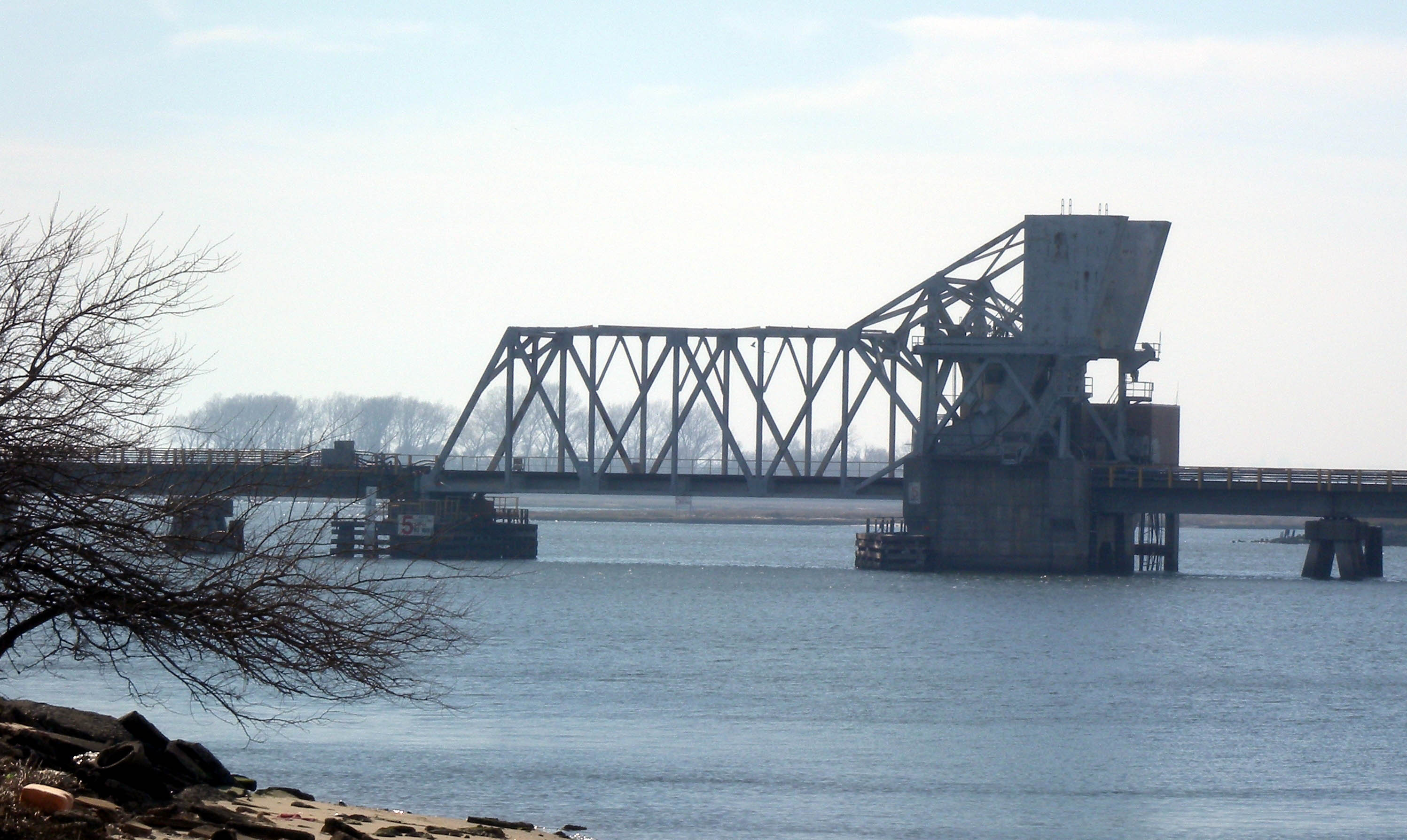
The Wreck Lead Bridge carries the Long Island Rail Road's Long Beach Branch over the channel

Reynolds Channel is a strait in Nassau County, New York that separates Long Beach Barrier Island – which contains the City of Long Beach and the villages of Atlantic Beach, Lido Beach, and Point Lookout – from Long Island, Barnum Island, Harbor Isle, and various uninhabited islands between Long Beach Island and Long Island.

== Description ==
Reynolds Channel begins at the East Rockaway Inlet to the west, and ends at Point Lookout to the east, where it merges with the Jones Inlet.

The channel is named after William H. Reynolds, a developer and former State Senator who greatly built up Long Beach Island in the early 20th century.

== Crossings ==
There are four bridges that cross Reynolds channel:

- The Atlantic Beach Bridge, which carries the Nassau Expressway (NY 878) over the channel.
- The Wreck Lead Bridge, which carries the Long Beach Branch of the Long Island Rail Road over the channel.
- The Long Beach Bridge, which carries Long Beach Road over the channel.
- The Loop Parkway Bridge, which carries the Loop Parkway over the channel.

== See also ==
- Jones Beach Island
- South Oyster Bay
