= Shell House =

Shell House or The Shell House may refer to:

== Buildings ==
- The Shell House, an historic home in Nassau County, New York
- Shell-Haus, a classical modernist architectural masterwork in the Tiergarten district of Berlin
- The Shell House, a hexagonal structure in Staunton Country Park
- Shell House (Johannesburg), former headquarters of the African National Congress and site of the Shell House massacre
- Shell House, Brisbane, heritage-listed building in Brisbane, Australia
- Shell Mex House in London
- Shellhus, Copenhagen, Denmark – the target of the controversial British air raid, Operation Carthage, during World War II

== Other uses ==
- Shell House (Western Australia), an area of coastal cliffs in Mid West Western Australia
