= National Register of Historic Places listings in Glen Cove, New York =

This is a list of all National Register of Historic Places listings in the City of Glen Cove in Nassau County, New York. The locations of National Register properties for which the latitude and longitude coordinates are included below, may be seen in an online map.

== Listings ==
	Name on the Register	Image	Date listed	Location	City or town	Description
1	Glen Cove Post Office	Glen Cove Post Office	November 29, 2010 (#10000957)	51 Glen St. 40°51′50″N 73°37′46″W	Glen Cove	
2	Justice Court Building	Justice Court Building	April 26, 1990 (#90000691)	Jct. of Town Path Extension and Glen Cove Arterial Highway; 40°51′44″N 73°37′34″W	Glen Cove	
3	Sea Cliff Railroad Station	Sea Cliff Railroad Station	February 18, 1988 (#88000021)	Sea Cliff Avenue; 40°51′07″N 73°37′34″W	Glen Cove	
4	The Shell House	The Shell House	June 2, 1988 (#88000600)	26 Westland Drive; 40°53′52″N 73°38′03″W	Glen Cove	
5	US Post Office-Glen Cove	US Post Office-Glen Cove	May 11, 1989 (#88002525)	2 Glen Cove Street; 40°51′46″N 73°38′01″W	Glen Cove	
6	Woolworth Estate	Woolworth Estate	May 17, 1979 (#79001593)	77 Crescent Beach Road; 40°52′31″N 73°38′38″W	Glen Cove	

== See also ==
- National Register of Historic Places listings in New York
- National Register of Historic Places listings in Nassau County, New York
