= Tiergarten (district) =

- Quarter of Berlin
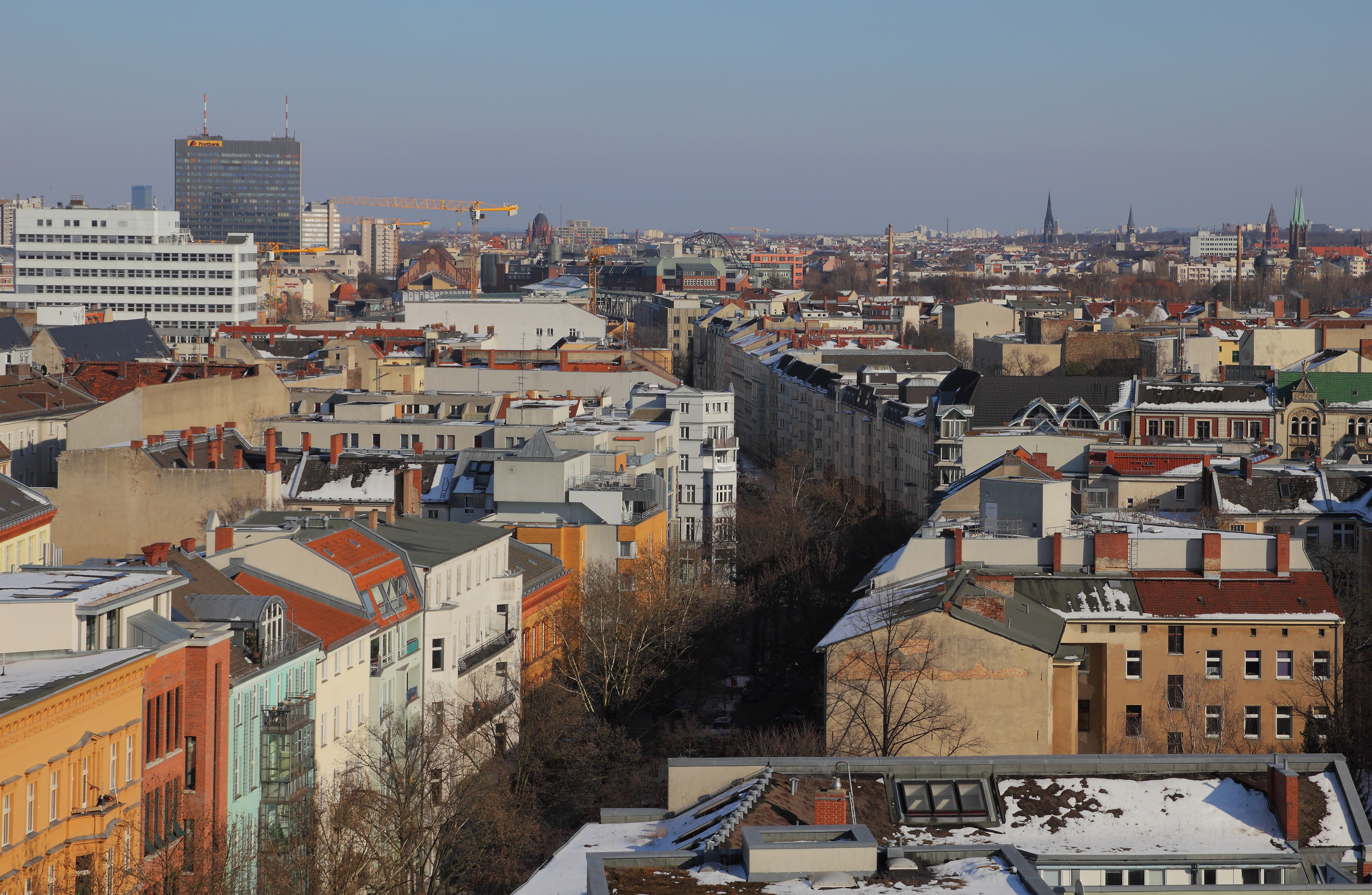
- A panoramic view of the southern part of the Tiergarten

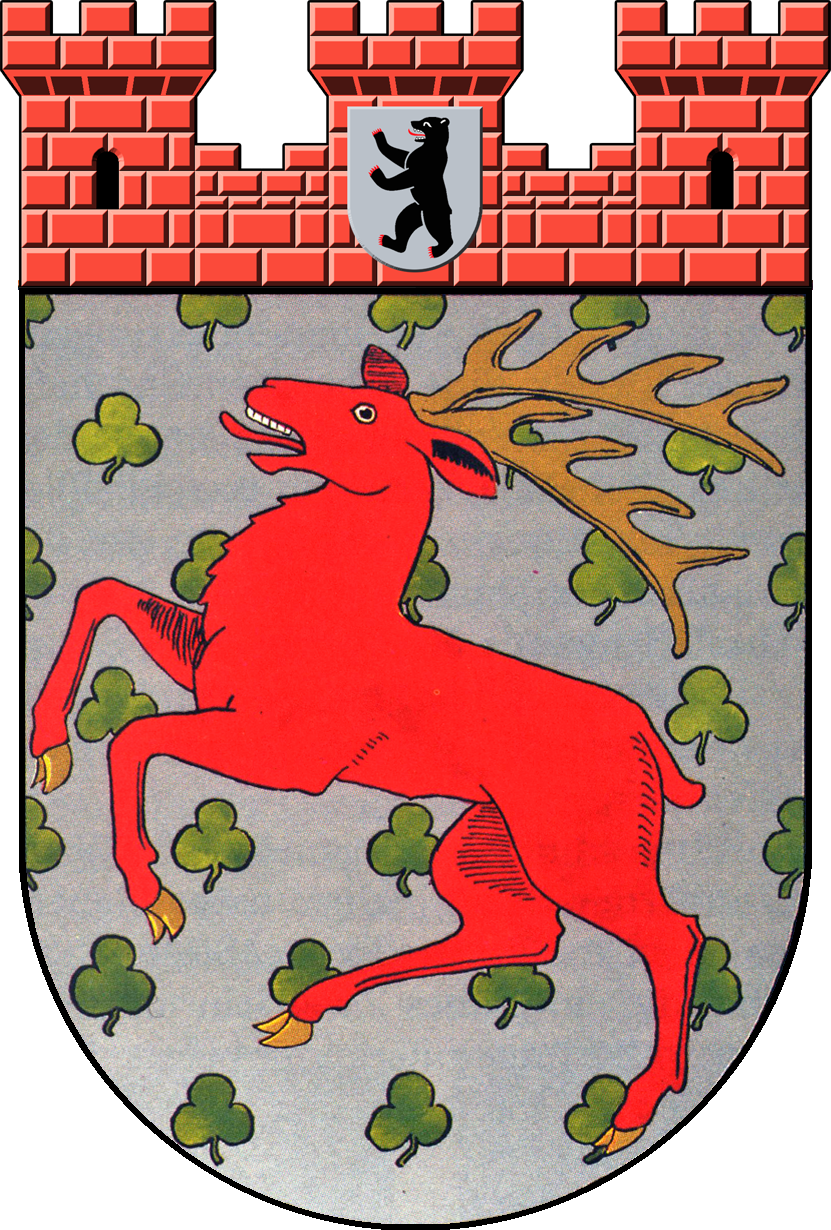
- Coat of arms

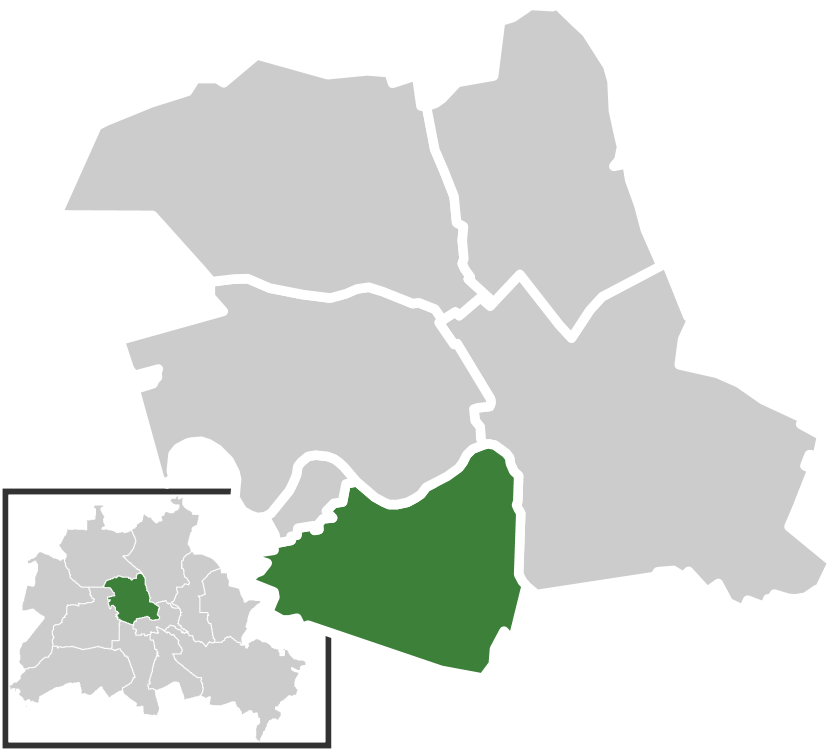
- Location of Tiergarten in Mitte borough and Berlin
- Interactive map of Tiergarten
- Location within Germany Location within Berlin
- Coordinates: 52°31′00″N 13°22′00″E
- Country: Germany
- State: Berlin
- City: Berlin
- Borough: Mitte
- Founded: 1861

Area
  - Total: 5.17 km^{2} (2.00 sq mi)
- Elevation: 52 m (171 ft)

Population (2024-12-31)
  - Total: 16,162
  - Density: 3,130/km^{2} (8,100/sq mi)
- Time zone: UTC+01:00 (CET)
  - Summer (DST): UTC+02:00 (CEST)
- Postal codes: 10557, 10785, 10787
- Vehicle registration: B

Tiergarten (German: [ˈtiːɐ̯ˌɡaʁtn̩], literally Animal Garden, historically meaning deer park or hunting game park) is a locality within the borough of Mitte, in central Berlin (Germany). Notable for the great and homonymous urban park, before German reunification, it was a part of West Berlin. Until Berlin's 2001 administrative reform, Tiergarten was also the name of a borough (Bezirk), consisting of the current locality (Ortsteil) of Tiergarten (formerly called Tiergarten-Süd) plus Hansaviertel and Moabit. A new system of road and rail tunnels runs under the park towards Berlin's main station in nearby Moabit.

== History ==
=== Historical notes ===
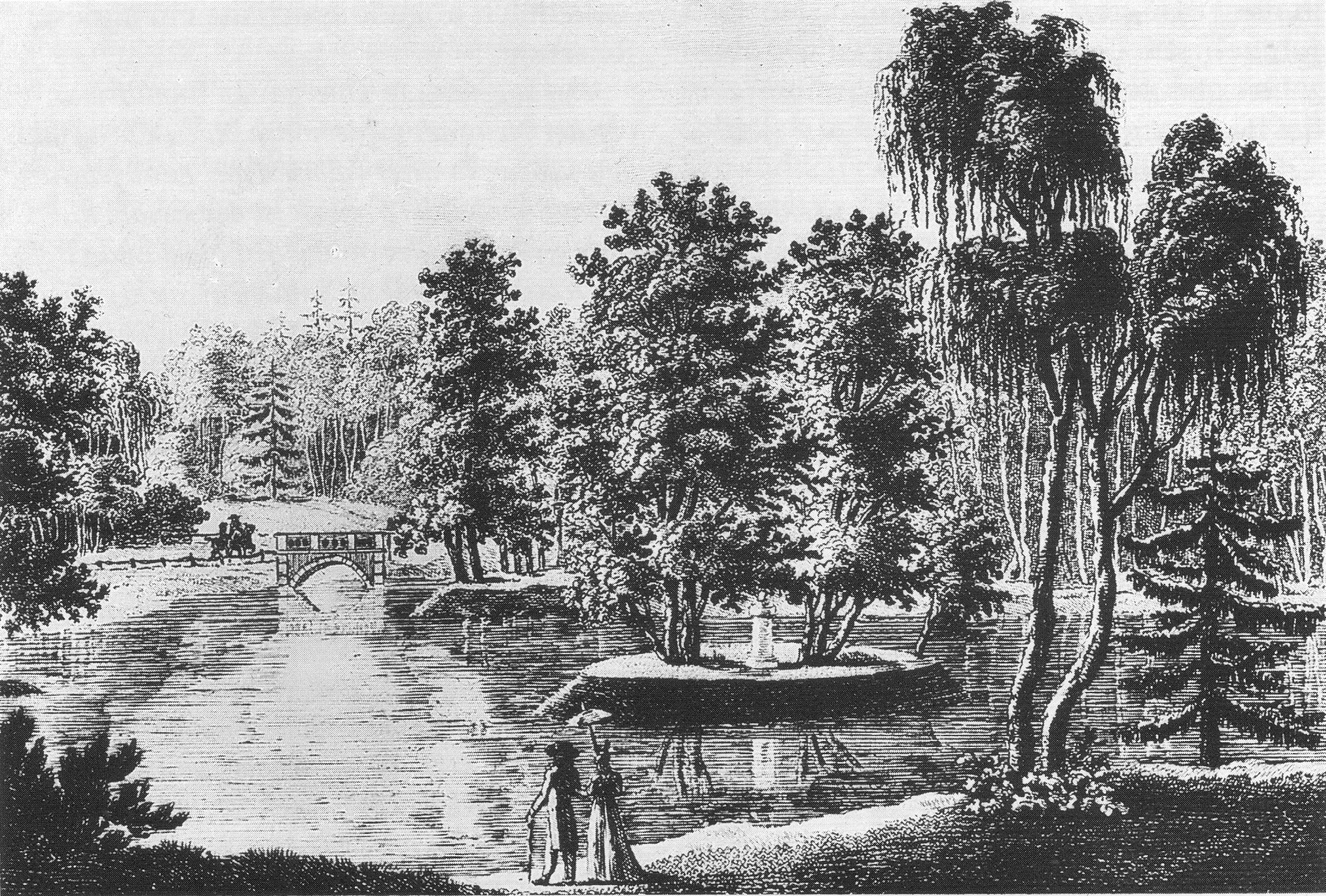
The Rousseau Island in the Großer Tiergarten, early-19th-century engraving

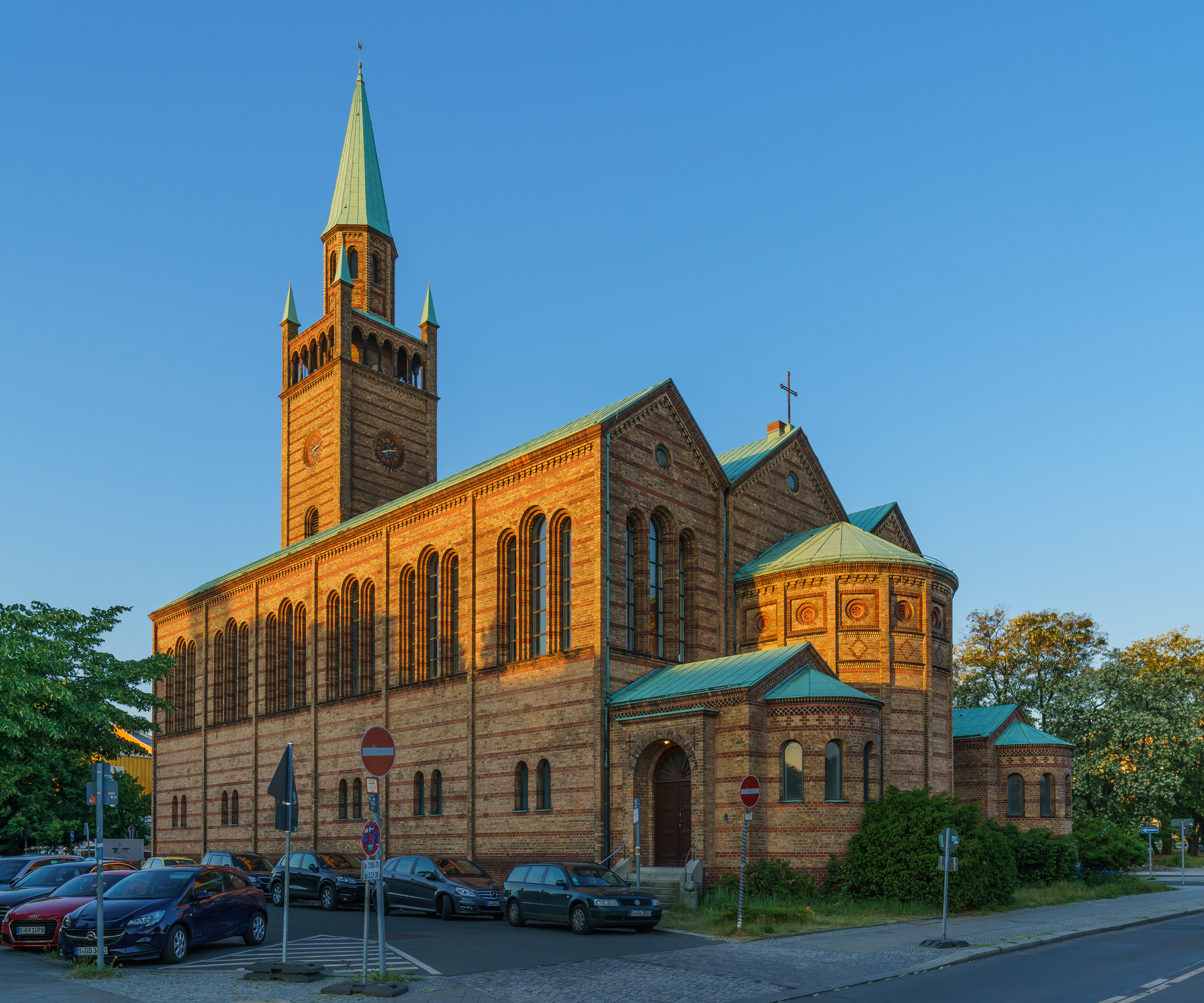
St Matthew Church

Once a hunting ground of the Electors of Brandenburg the Großer Tiergarten park of today was designed in the 1830s by landscape architect Peter Joseph Lenné. In the course of industrialization in the 19th century, a network of streets was laid out in the Hobrecht-Plan in an area that came to be known architecturally as the Wilhelmine Ring.

In 1894, the Reichstag building by architect Paul Wallot opened as the seat of the German parliament. The lawn between the contemporary Haus der Kulturen der Welt (House of World Cultures). The Reichstag building was the site of the Krolloper opera house, built in 1844, which served as the parliament house after the Reichstag fire on 27 February 1933. It was demolished by air raids in 1943.

On 15 January 1919 the socialist Karl Liebknecht was shot by Freikorps soldiers in the park near the lake Neuer See. The corpse of Rosa Luxemburg, murdered on the same day, was found in the nearby Landwehrkanal on 1 June 1919.

The first Institut für Sexualwissenschaft (Institute for Sex Research) of Magnus Hirschfeld was situated at the former In den Zelten street, near the contemporary Haus der Kulturen der Welt, from 1919 until it was closed by the Nazis in 1933.

A site next to the Tiergarten park is the former location of a villa at Tiergartenstrasse 4 where more than 60 Nazi bureaucrats and doctors worked in secret under the "T4" program to organize the mass murder of sanatorium and psychiatric hospital patients deemed unworthy to live. The German national memorial to the people with disabilities systematically murdered by the Nazis was dedicated in 2014 in Berlin at that site. Although the villa was destroyed, a Stolperstein set in the pavement on Tiergartenstraße marks its location and historic significance.

After 1944, the park was largely deforested because it served as a source of firewood for the devastated city. In 1945, the Soviet Union built a war memorial along the Straße des 17. Juni, the Tiergarten's main east–west artery, near the Brandenburg Gate. The Tiergarten itself became part of the British sector.

=== Tiergarten today ===
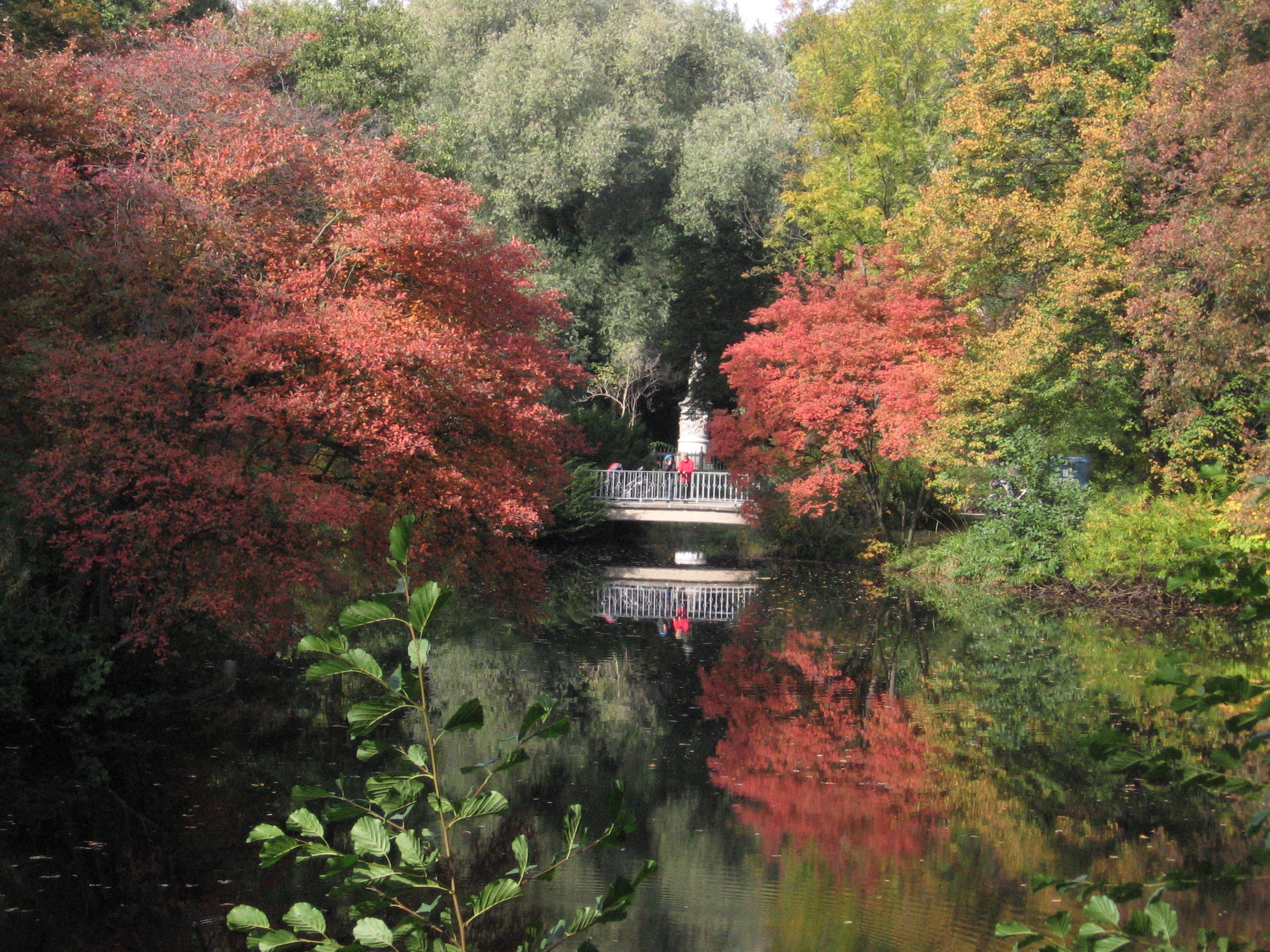
Luiseninsel in autumn

The Tiergarten houses many parliamentary and governmental institutions, among others the Bundestag in the Reichstag building and the new German Chancellery. The residence of the German President, Schloss Bellevue and the Carillon are located in the Tiergarten park. It contains several notable sculptures, including the four-tiered Victory Column (Siegessäule), the Bismarck Memorial and several other memorials to prominent Prussian generals, all of which were located in the ceremonial park facing the Reichstag, before they were moved to their present location by the Nazis. The tree-lined pedestrian avenues emanating from the Victory Column contain several ceremonial sculptures of Prussian aristocrats enacting an 18th-century hunt.

The Brandenburg Gate and the Potsdamer Platz are situated on the eastern rim of the Tiergarten, which was the former frontier between East and West Berlin. Nearby is the Kulturforum stretching from the Berliner Philharmonie, a 1963 concert hall by architect Hans Scharoun and home of the Berlin Philharmonic orchestra to the Neue Nationalgalerie built by Ludwig Mies van der Rohe in 1968. In between are the neoclassical Saint Matthew Church, built in 1845 by Friedrich August Stüler, the Gemäldegalerie as well as the new branch of the Berlin State Library (Staatsbibliothek).

The adjacent area between the park and the Landwehrkanal is home to Emil Fahrenkamp's 1932 Shell-Haus, numerous embassies and the Bendlerblock, where in 1944 Claus Schenk Graf von Stauffenberg and the conspirators of the 20 July plot were shot by a firing squad. Today the building serves as second office of Germany's Federal Ministry of Defense. The headquarters of the Christian Democratic Party, the Konrad Adenauer Foundation and Friedrich Ebert Foundation academies as well as the Bauhaus Archive and the high schools Französisches Gymnasium and Canisius-Kolleg are located nearby. The adjacent western area at the border to Charlottenburg houses the Berlin Zoo.

The 1985 album Le Parc by Tangerine Dream contains a track titled Tiergarten. Rufus Wainwright also released a track titled Tiergarten as part of his 2007 album, Release the Stars.

Since 1987, the annual Berlin Marathon starts at Tiergarten near the Brandenburg Gate.

Between 1996 and 2003 and then in 2006, the Love Parade music festival took place at the Victory Column and Straße des 17. Juni. On 2 July 2005, the Live 8 concert, Berlin took place at the Victory Column.

On 24 July 2008, then-US presidential candidate Barack Obama spoke at the Victory Column in front of a crowd of over 200,000 people.

== Großer Tiergarten ==
Covering 210 hectares (520 acres), the "Großer Tiergarten" is the largest urban park of Berlin.
