= National Register of Historic Places listings in New York =

Map of the counties of New York State

Map of the counties of New York State

Buildings, sites, districts, and objects in New York listed on the National Register of Historic Places:

There are over 6,000 properties and districts listed on the National Register of Historic Places in New York State. Some are listed within each one of the 62 counties in New York State. Of these, 264 are further designated as National Historic Landmarks.

This National Park Service list is complete through NPS recent listings posted November 6, 2026.

== Numbers of properties and districts ==
The numbers of properties and districts in New York State or in any of its 62 counties are not reported by the National Register. Following are approximate tallies of current listings from lists of the specific properties and districts.

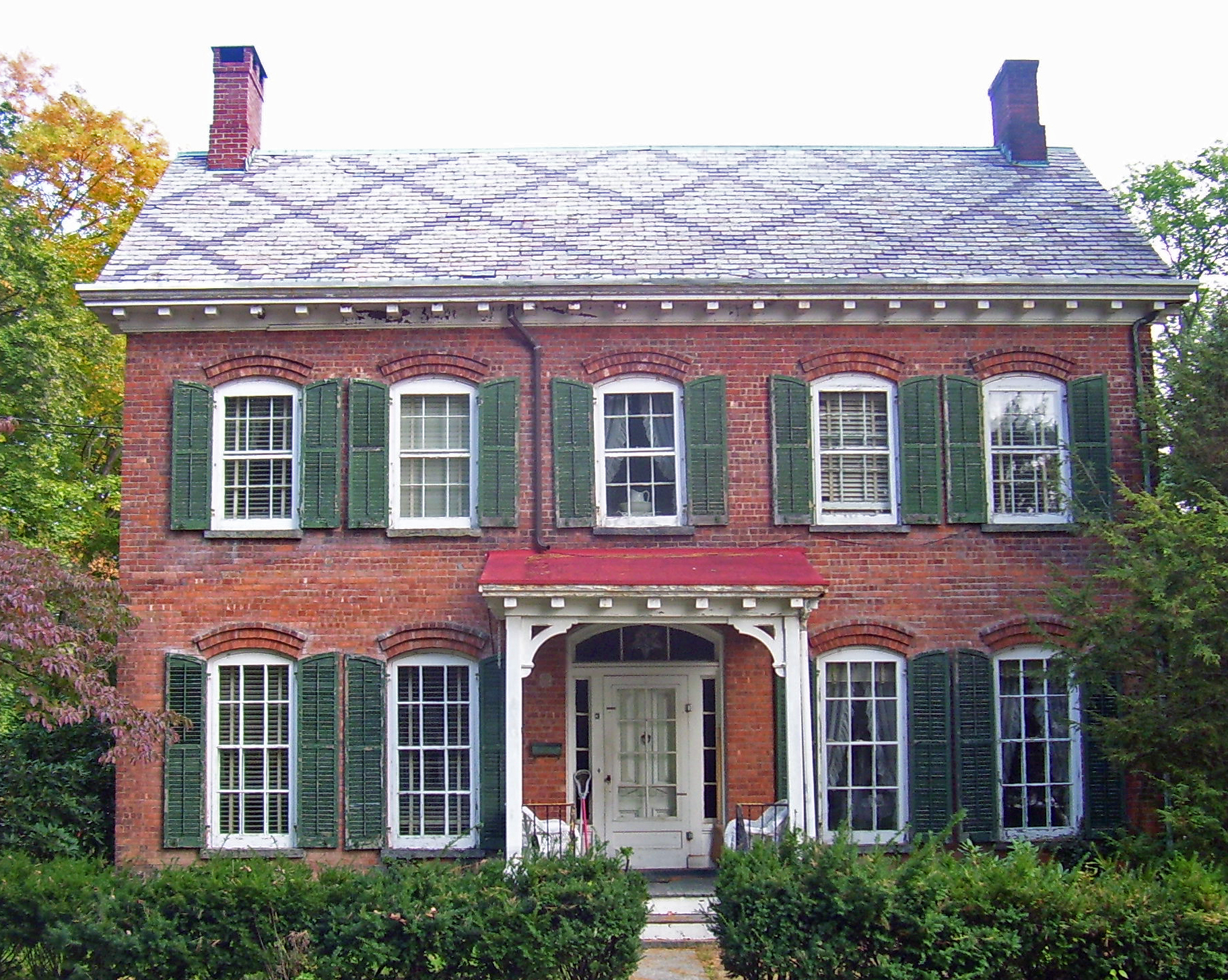
House at 3 Crown Street, Nelsonville, in Putnam County

New York State Capitol, in Albany County

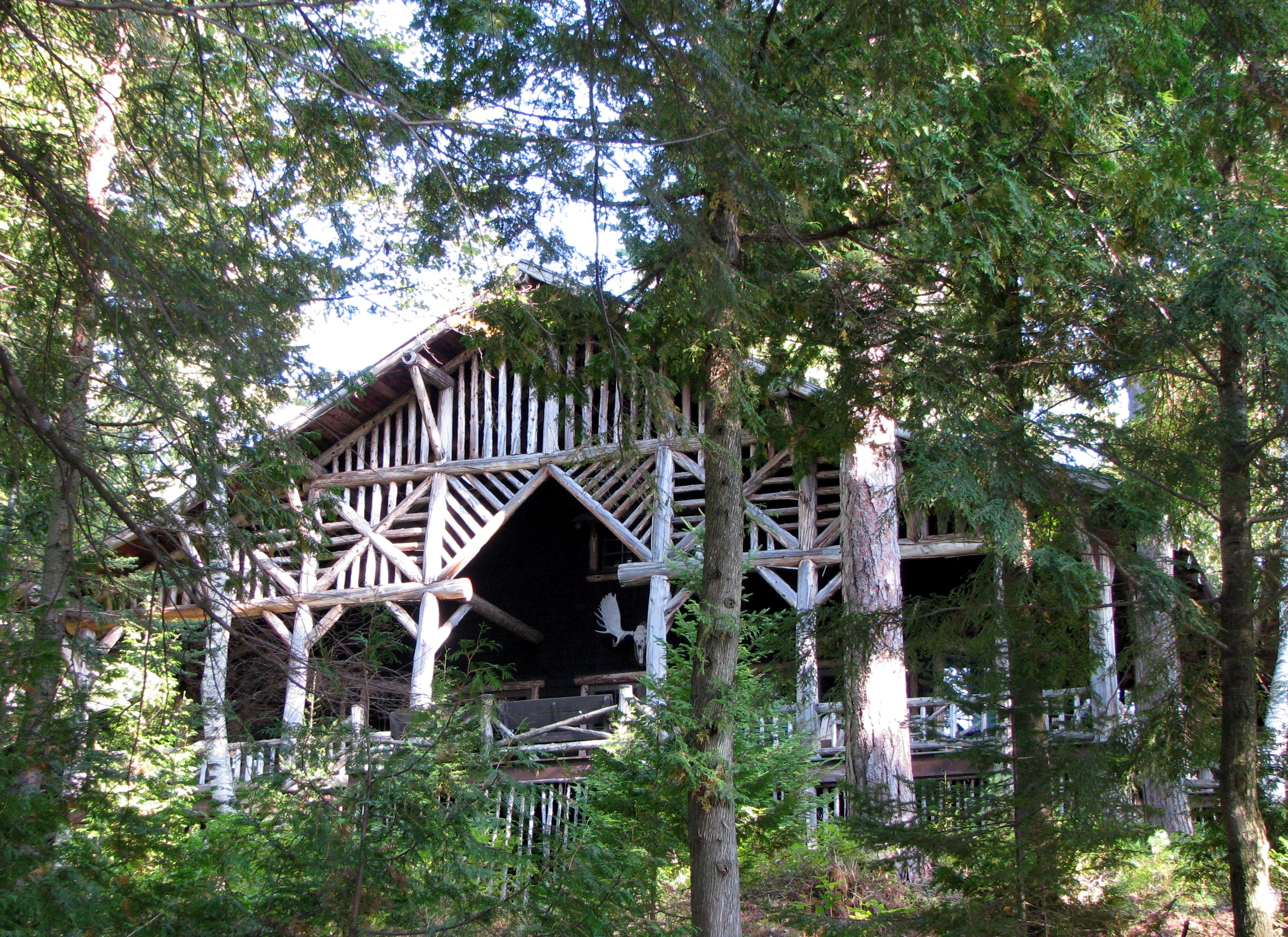
Eagle Island Camp, Saranac Lake, in Franklin County

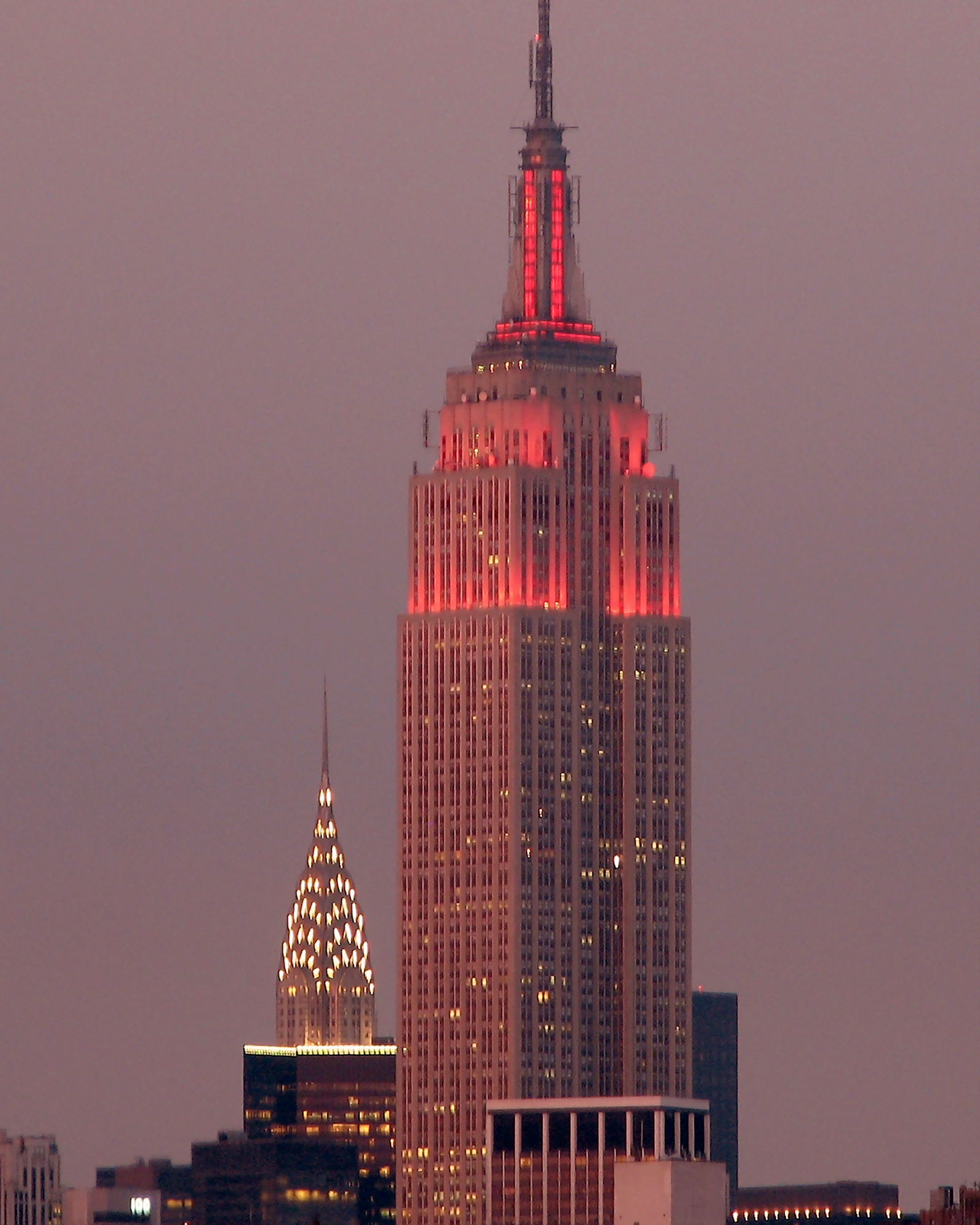
Empire State Building, Manhattan, in New York County

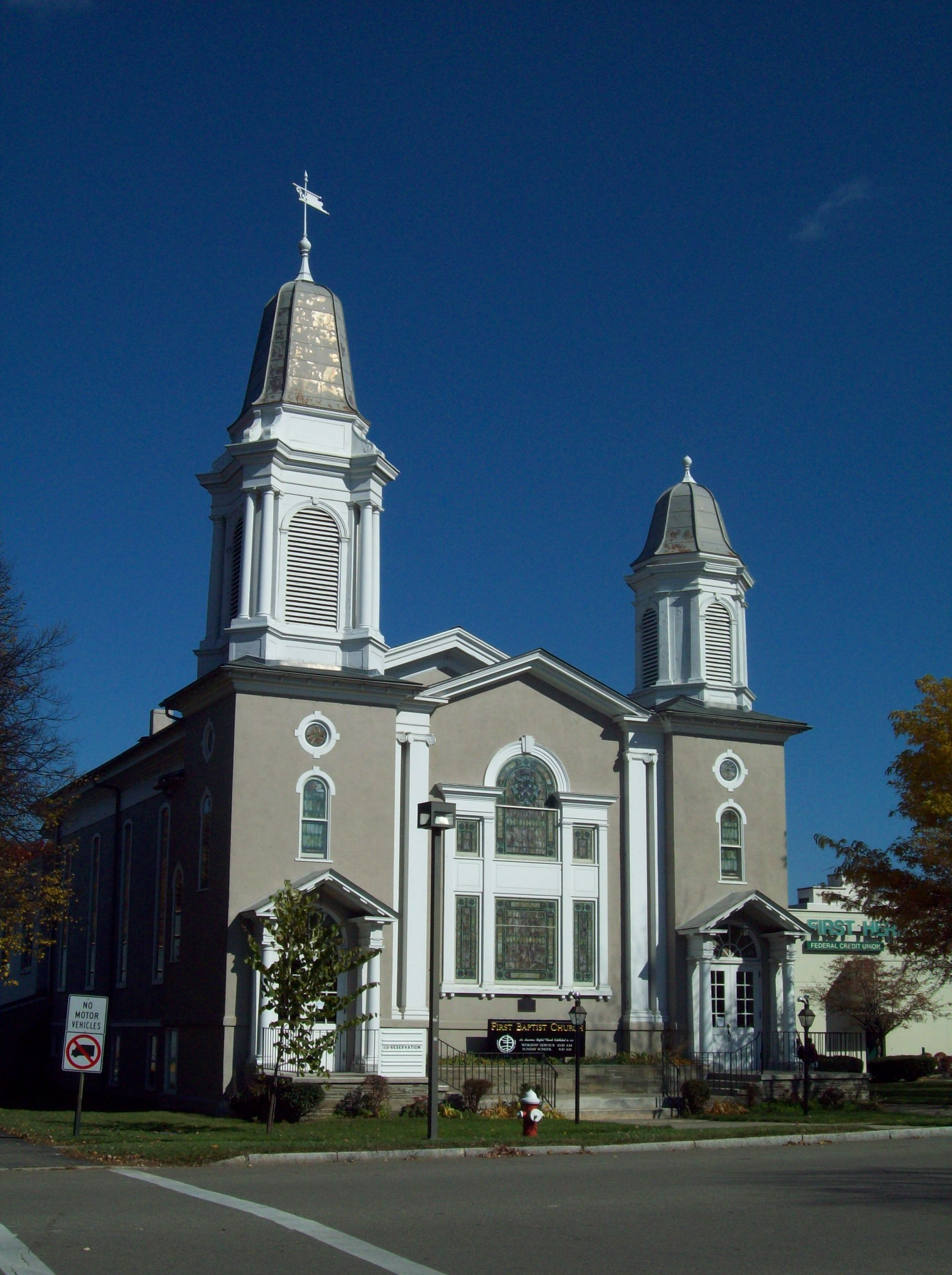
First Baptist Church of Painted Post, Painted Post, in Steuben County

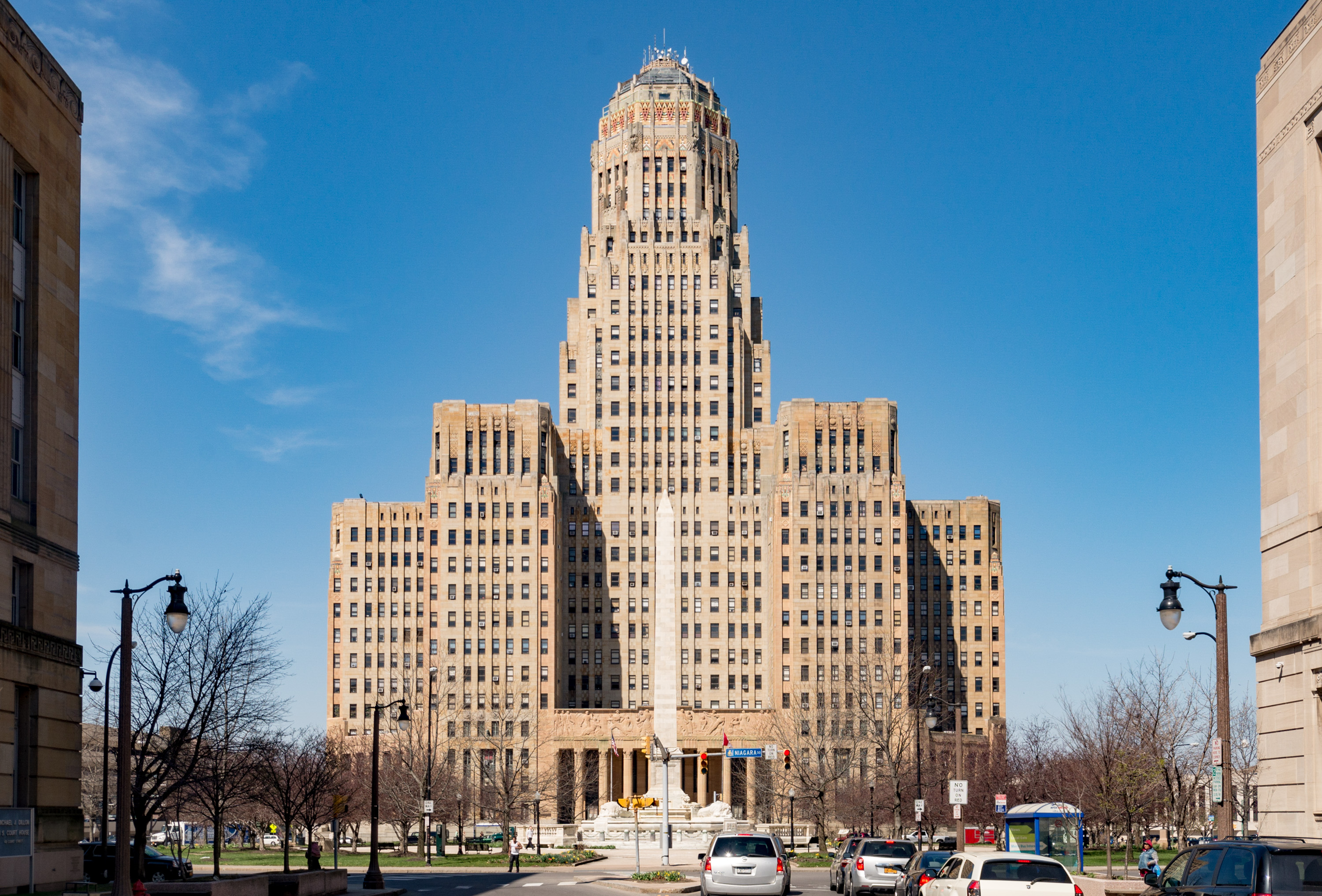
Buffalo City Hall, Buffalo, in Erie County

	County	# of sites
1.1	Albany: Albany	78
1.2	Albany: Other	155
1.3	Albany: Duplicates	(1)
	Albany: Total	232
2	Allegany	32
3	Bronx	89
4	Broome	67
5	Cattaraugus	37
6	Cayuga	73
7	Chautauqua	56
8	Chemung	46
9	Chenango	47
10	Clinton	55
11	Columbia	155
12	Cortland	30
13	Delaware	77
14.1	Dutchess: Poughkeepsie	98
14.2	Dutchess: Rhinebeck	40
14.3	Dutchess: Other	131
14.4	Dutchess: Duplicates	(1)
	Dutchess: Total	267
15.1	Erie: Buffalo	205
15.2	Erie: Other	85
	Erie: Total	290
16	Essex	123
17	Franklin	87
18	Fulton	28
19	Genesee	28
20	Greene	106
21	Hamilton	22
22	Herkimer	77
23	Jefferson	150
24	Kings	199
25	Lewis	36
26	Livingston	91
27	Madison	86
28.1	Monroe: Rochester	124
28.2	Monroe: Other	108
28.3	Monroe: Duplicates	(1)
	Monroe: Total	231
29	Montgomery	66
30.1	Nassau: Glen Cove	6
30.2	Nassau: Hempstead	29
30.3	Nassau: Long Beach	7
30.4	Nassau: North Hempstead	51
30.5	Nassau: Oyster Bay	63
	Nassau: Total	156
31.1	New York: Below 14th	188
31.2	New York: 14th-59th	164
31.3	New York: 59th-110th	117
31.4	New York: Above 110th	113
31.5	New York: Islands	15
31.6	New York: Duplicates	(1)
	New York: Total	596
32.1	Niagara: Niagara Falls	38
32.2	Niagara: Other	62
32.3	Niagara: Duplicates	0
	Niagara: Total	99
33	Oneida	92
34.1	Onondaga: Syracuse	126
34.2	Onondaga: Other	56
34.3	Onondaga: Duplicates	(1)
	Onondaga: Total	181
35	Ontario	78
36	Orange	189
37	Orleans	31
38	Oswego	95
39	Otsego	80
40	Putnam	51
41	Queens	111
42	Rensselaer	131
43	Richmond	64
44	Rockland	92
45	St. Lawrence	80
46	Saratoga	81
47	Schenectady	87
49	Schoharie	54
49	Schuyler	22
50	Seneca	42
51	Steuben	63
52.1	Suffolk: Babylon	6
52.2	Suffolk: Brookhaven	54
52.3	Suffolk: East Hampton	33
52.4	Suffolk: Huntington	102
52.5	Suffolk: Islip	26
52.6	Suffolk: Riverhead	14
52.7	Suffolk: Shelter Island	10
52.8	Suffolk: Smithtown	28
52.9	Suffolk: Southampton	39
52.10	Suffolk: Southold	29
	Suffolk: Duplicates	(1)
	Suffolk: Total	340
53	Sullivan	82
54	Tioga	55
55	Tompkins	65
56	Ulster	207
57	Warren	81
58	Washington	56
59	Wayne	42
60.1	Westchester: New Rochelle	13
60.2	Westchester: Peekskill	14
60.3	Westchester: Yonkers	29
60.4	Westchester: Northern	100
60.5	Westchester: Southern	92
	Westchester: Duplicates	(3)
	Westchester: Total	245
61	Wyoming	29
62	Yates	66
(duplicates)		(64)
Total:		6,563

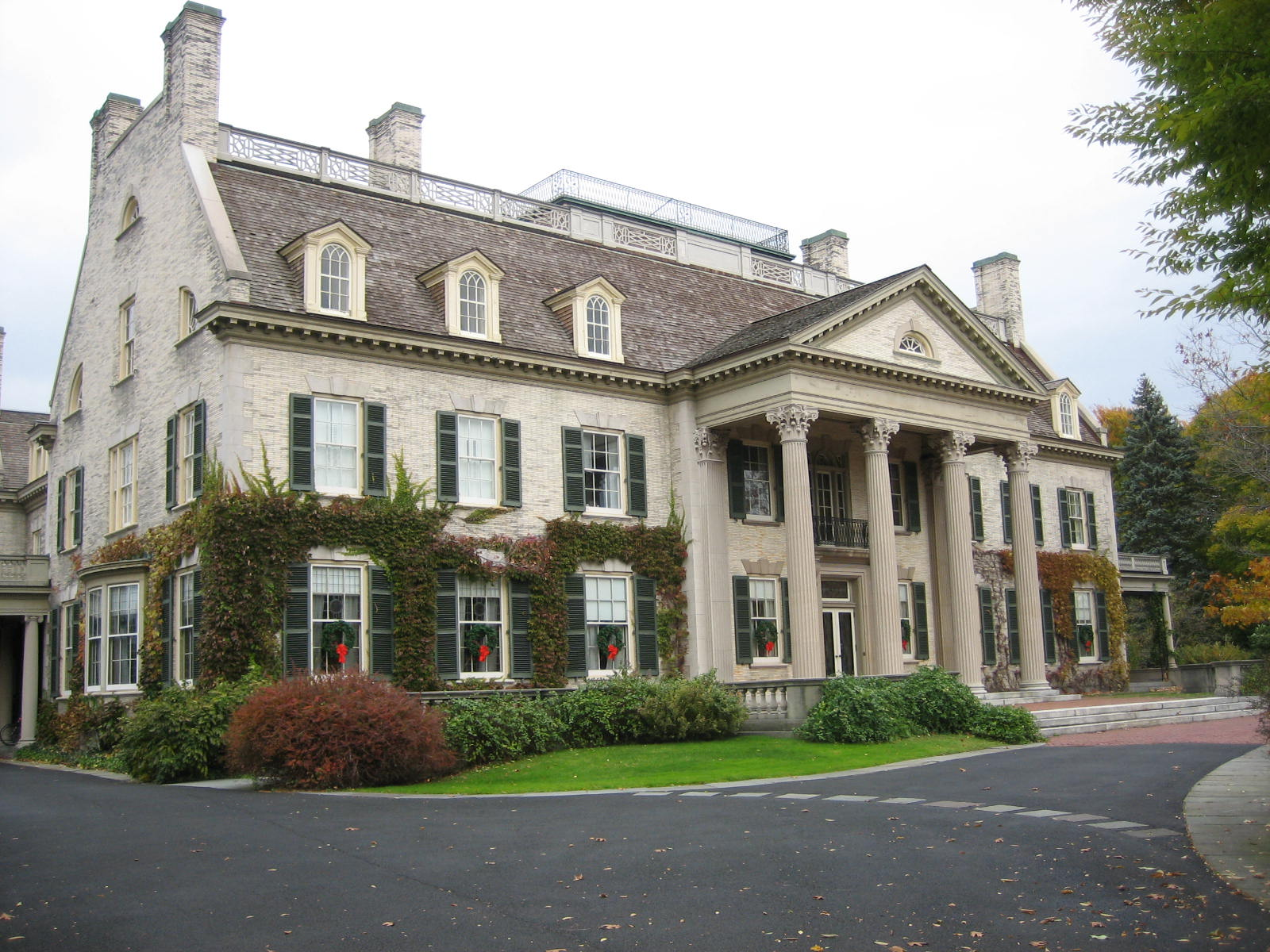
George Eastman House, Rochester, in Monroe County

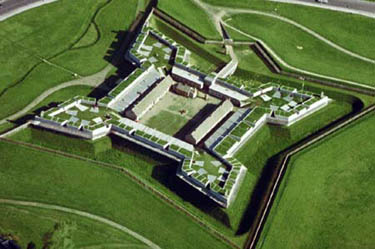
Fort Stanwix National Monument, Rome, in Oneida County

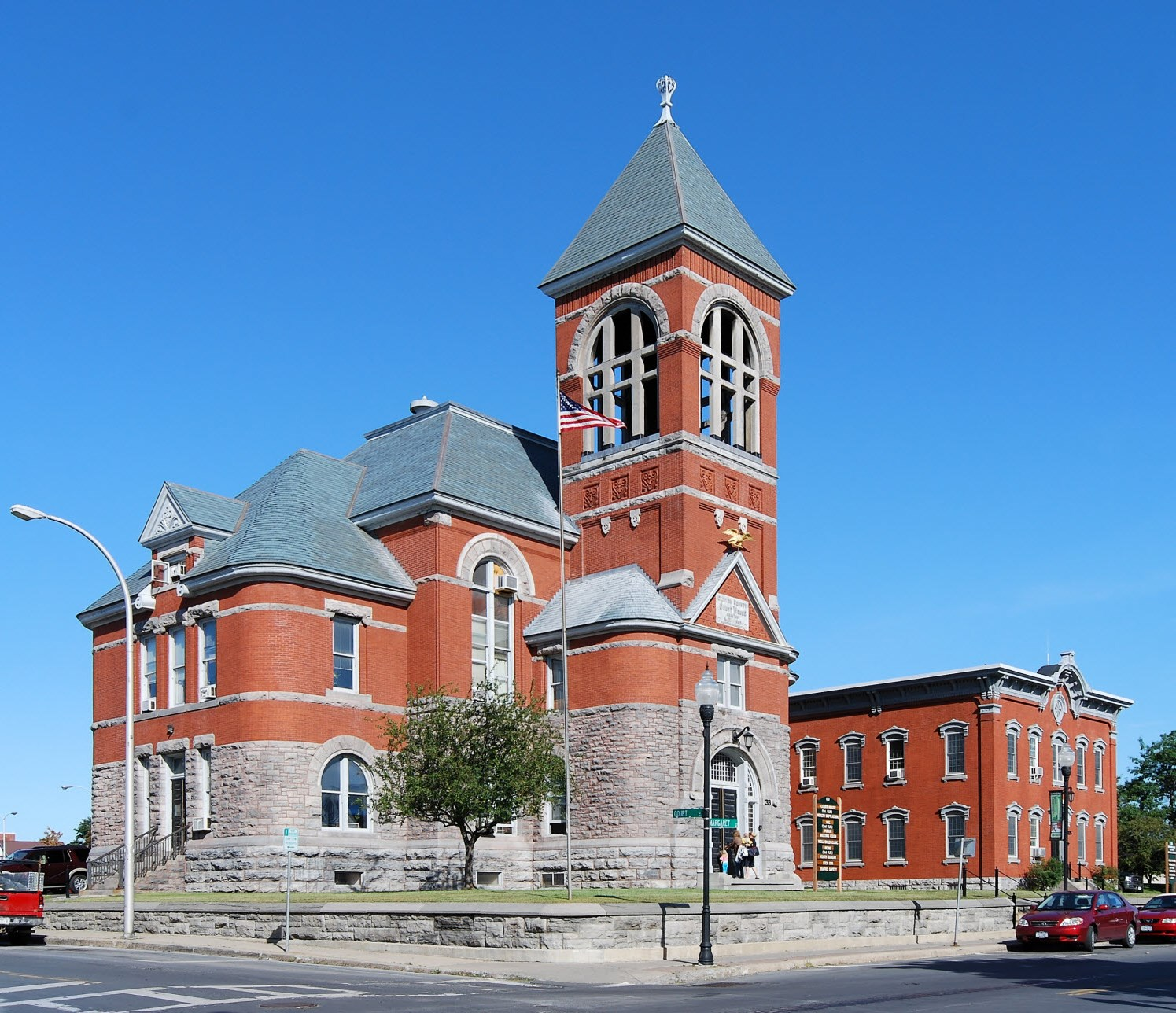
Clinton County Courthouse Complex, Plattsburgh, in Clinton County

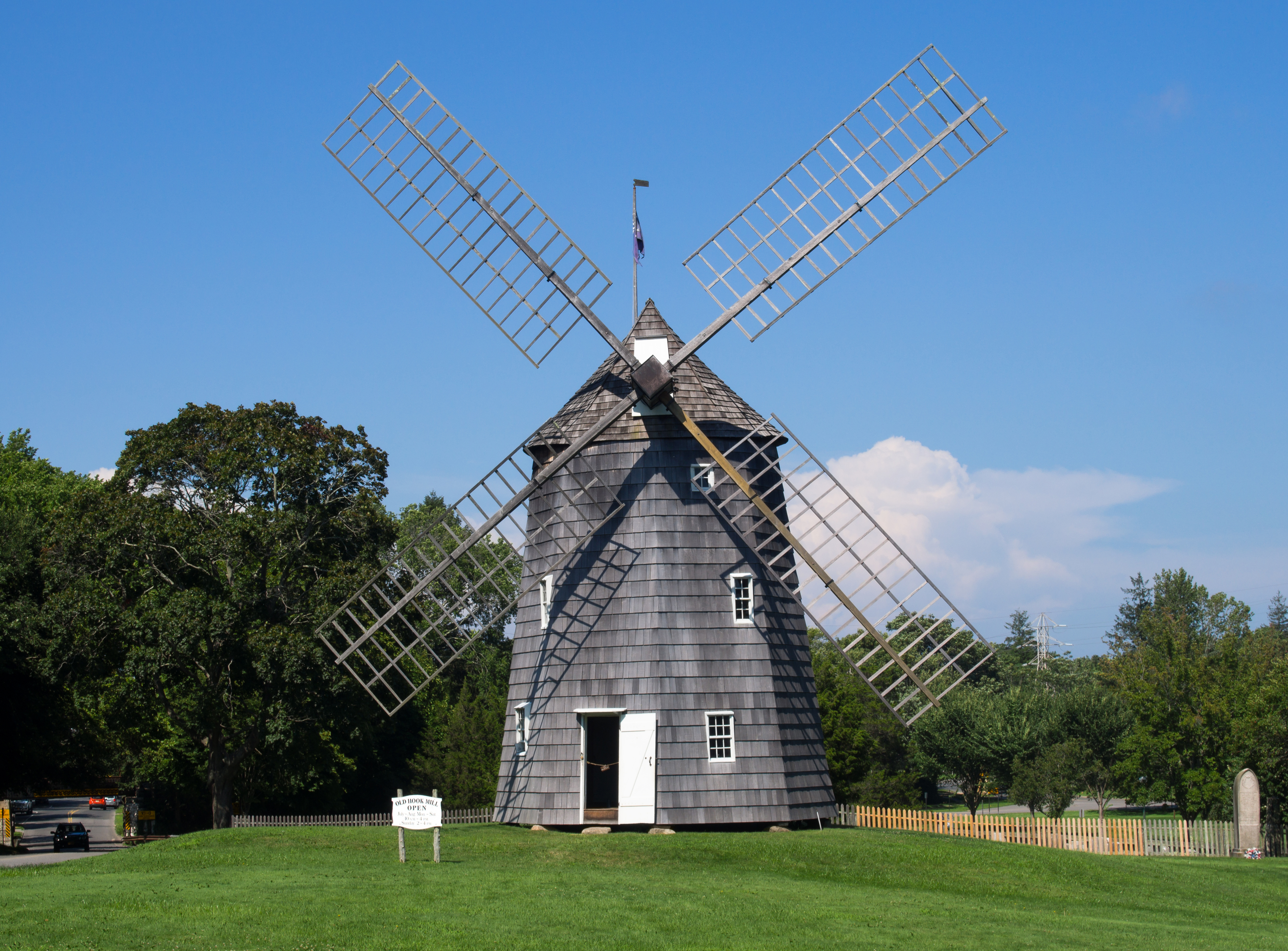
Hook Windmill, East Hampton, in Suffolk County

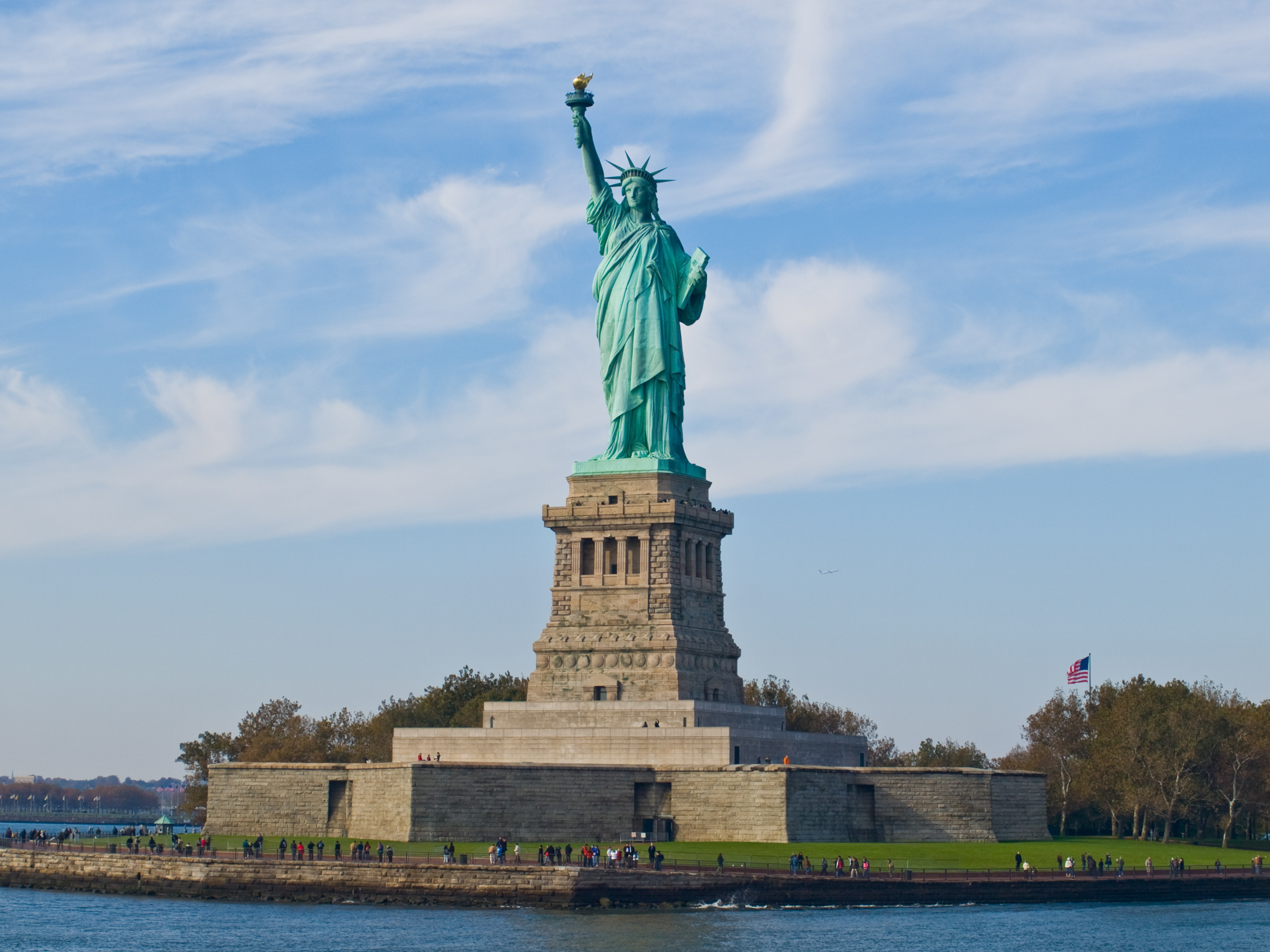
Statue of Liberty National Monument, Ellis Island and Liberty Island, Manhattan, in New York County

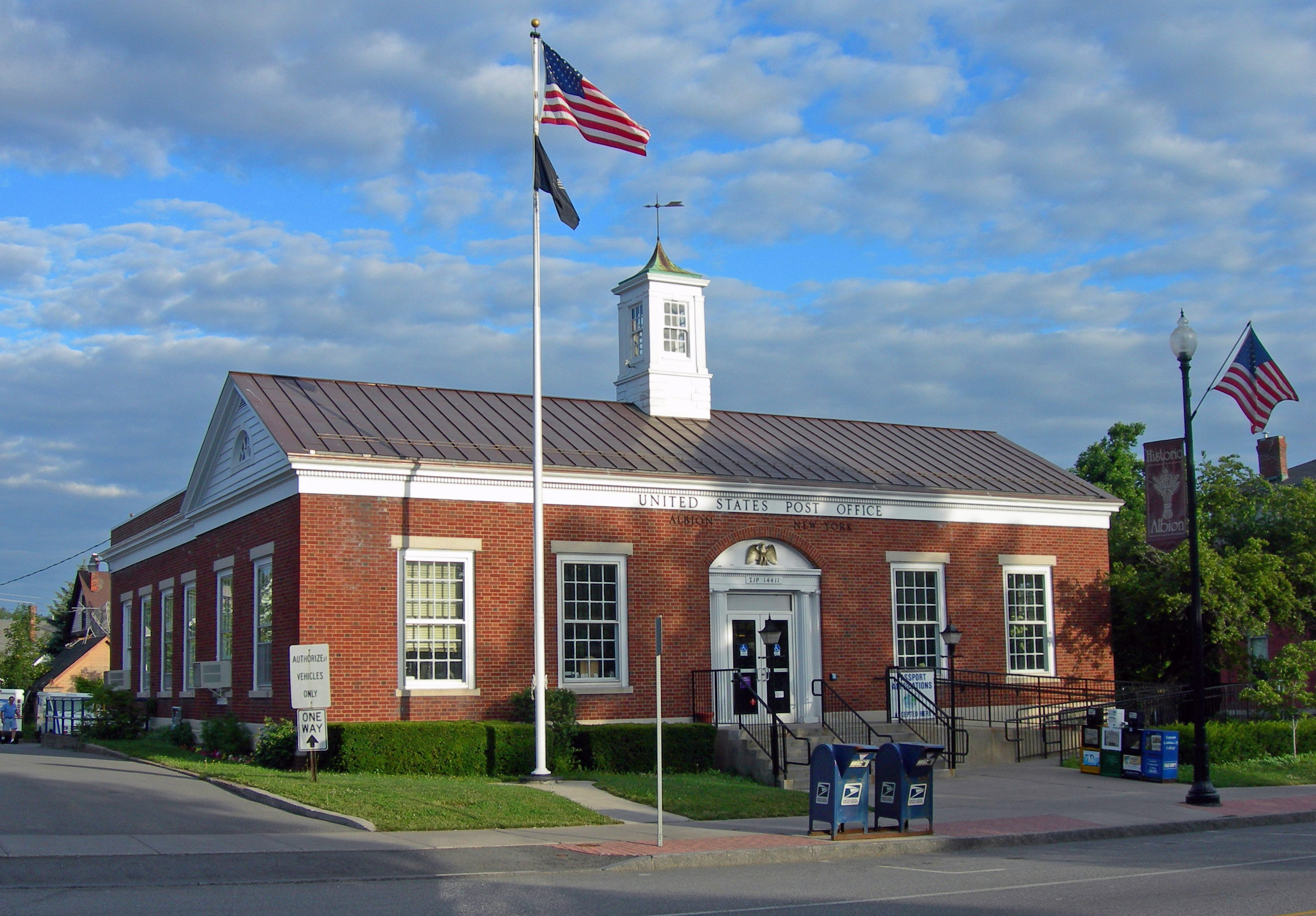
US Post Office-Albion, Albion, in Orleans County

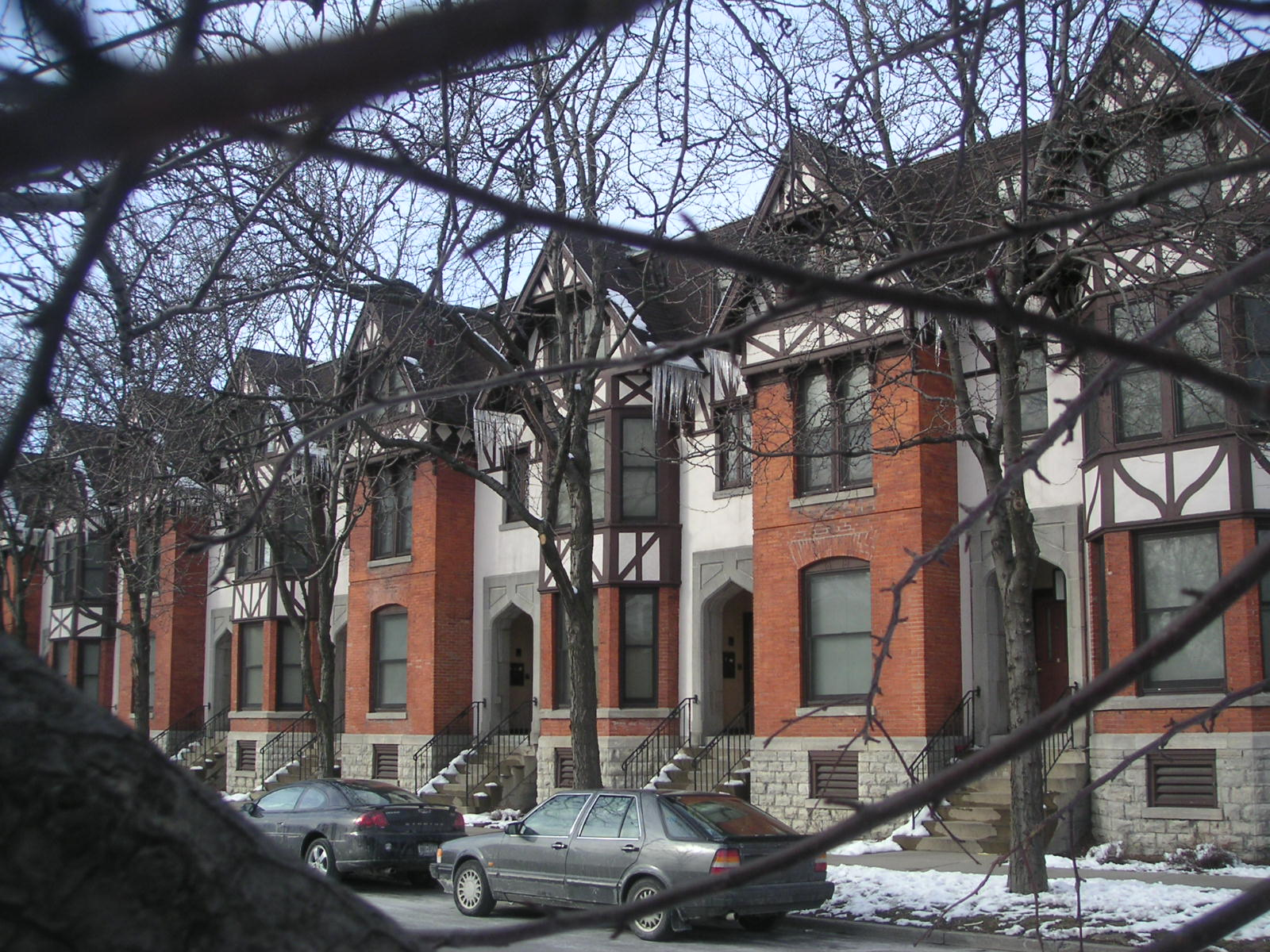
Hawley-Green Historic District, Syracuse, in Onondaga County

== See also ==
- List of National Historic Landmarks in New York
- List of bridges on the National Register of Historic Places in New York
- List of historical societies in New York (state)
- New York State Register of Historic Places
- New York State Office of Parks, Recreation and Historic Preservation
