= Shell-Haus =

Building in Berlin, Germany

Coordinates: 52°30′22″N 13°21′48″E

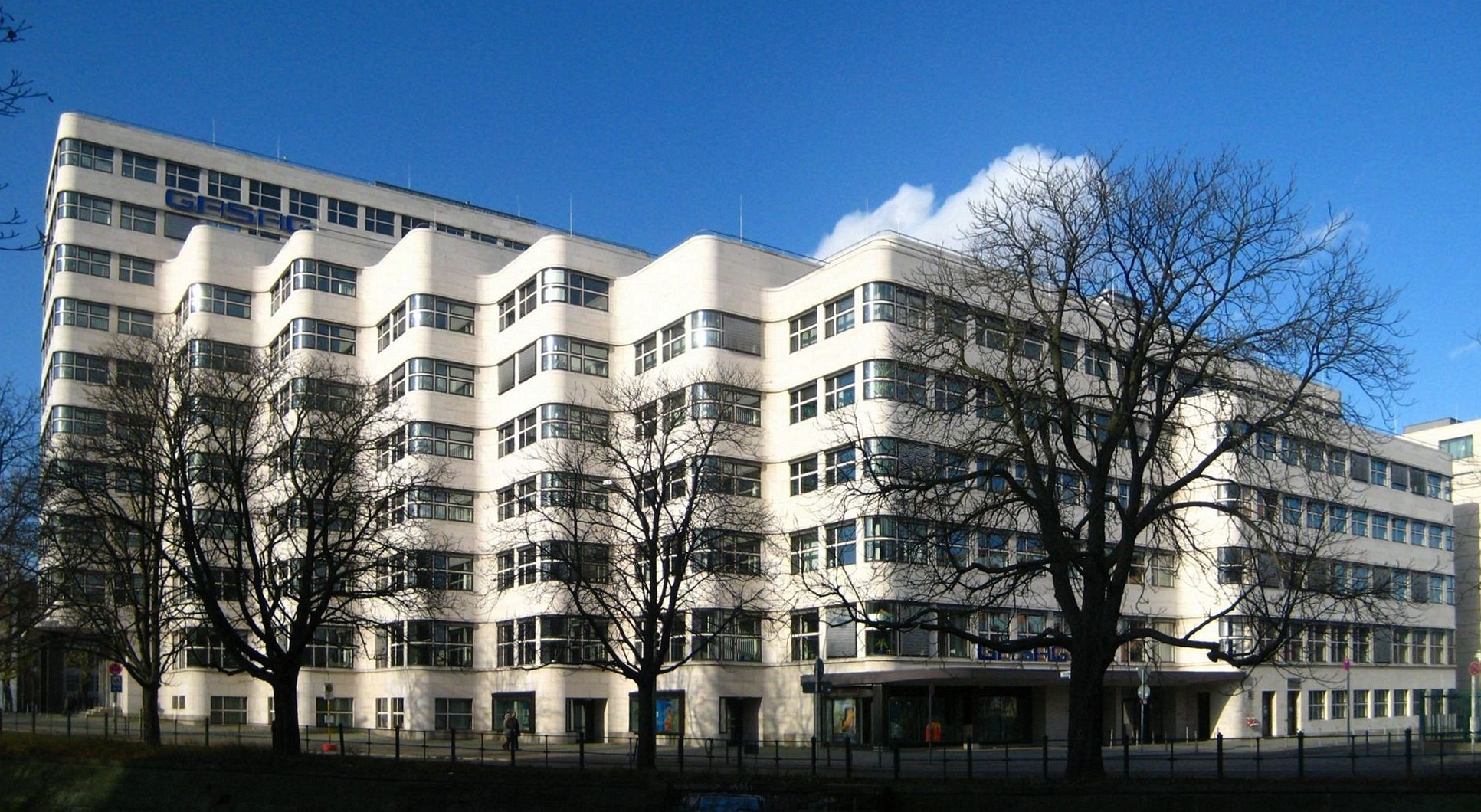
Shell-Haus, canal-side facade at Tiergarten

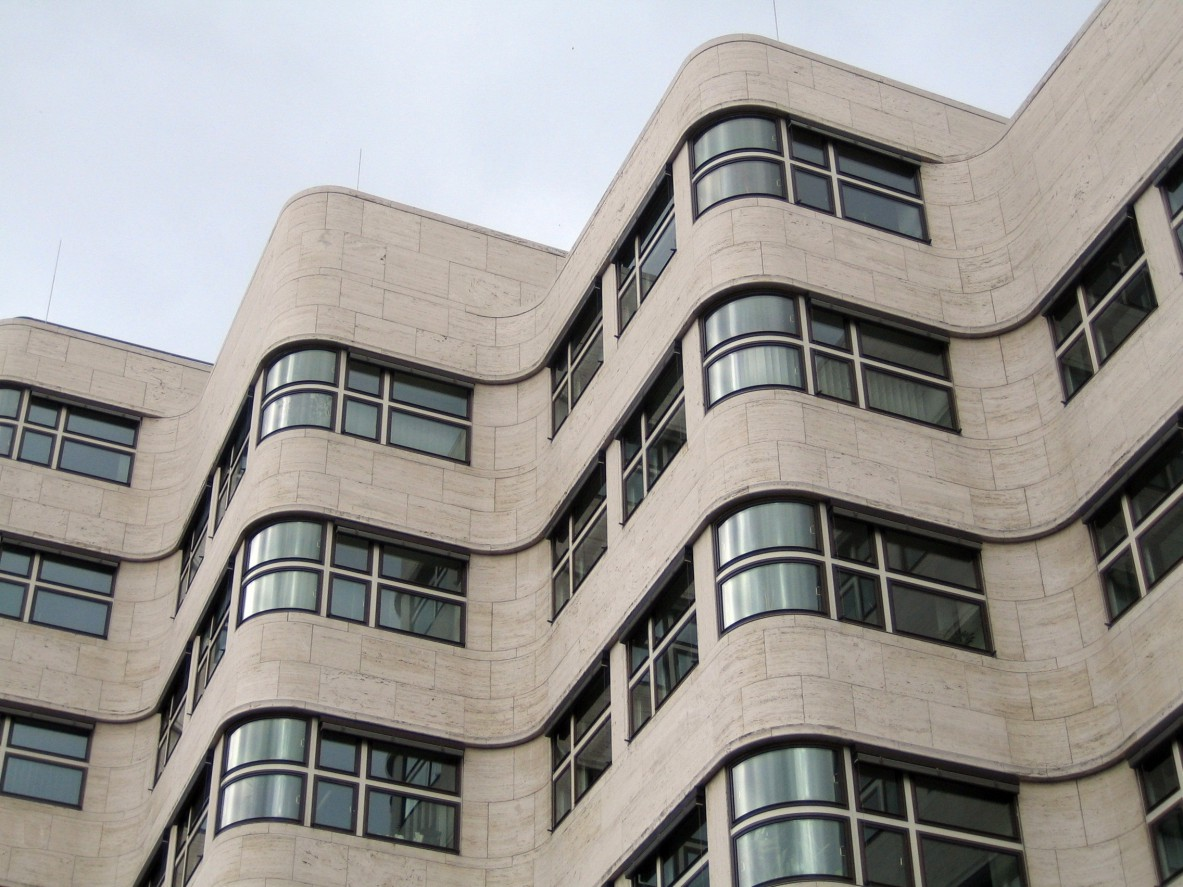
The striking wave façade of the restored Shell-Haus

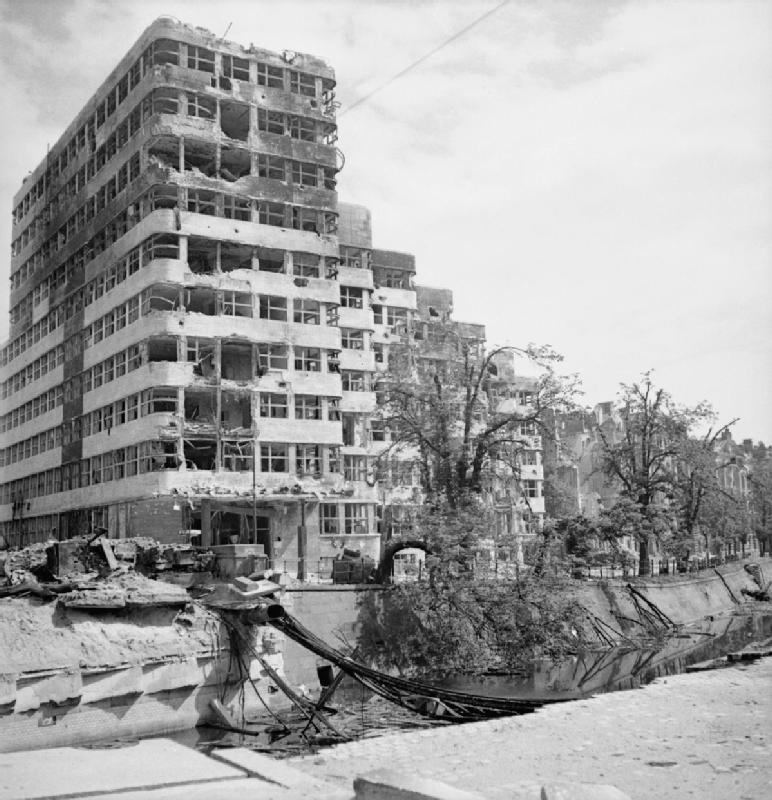
Damaged Shell House after World War II

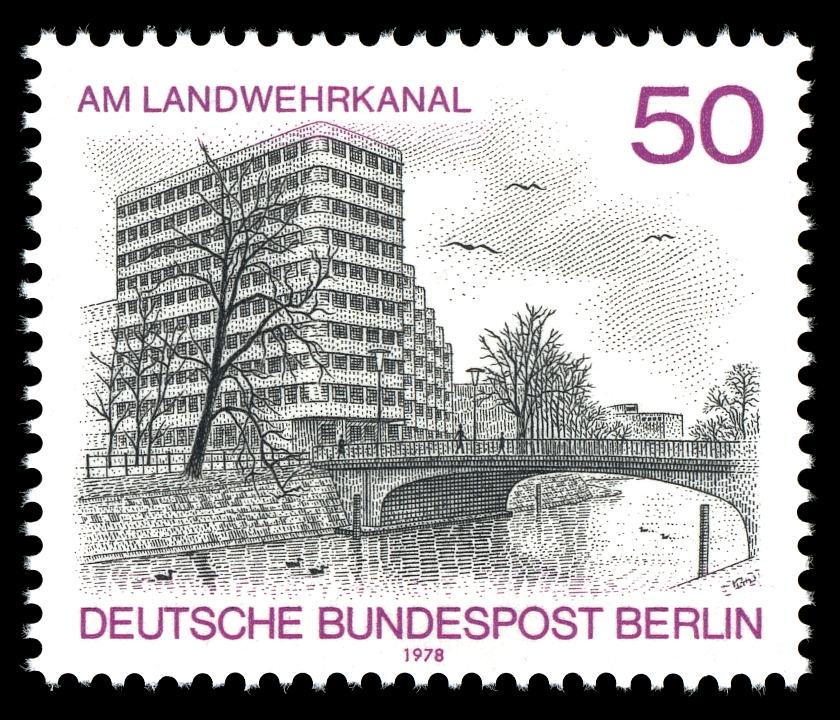
1978 Deutsche Bundespost Berlin postal stamp

The Shell-Haus (Shell House) is a modernist building that overlooks the Landwehrkanal in the Tiergarten district of Berlin, Germany. It was designed by Emil Fahrenkamp and was built in 1930–31.

== Building and design ==
In 1929 a competition was held between five architects to determine the designer of a prestigious new office block to house the headquarters of the mineral oil company, and Royal Dutch Shell subsidiary, Rhenania-Ossag. The victor was the German architect and professor Emil Fahrenkamp (1885-1966).

After almost two years in construction, Shell-Haus opened in 1932. At the time the building was noted for its modernist design, for its striking wave-like facade, and for being one of the first steel-framed high-rise buildings in Berlin. In retrospect it is regarded as Fahrenkamp’s masterpiece and one of the most significant office block designs of the Weimar Republic.

Shell-Haus' forms are stylistically reminiscent of the German modern realist movement New Objectivity, but Fahrenkamp also incorporated more traditional aspects to his design.

The most eye-catching feature of Shell-Haus is its main facade, which jumps forward in six waves whilst at the same time increasing in height from six levels (five at the back) to ten. The building itself comprises four wings situated around a four-sided inner courtyard.

== History ==
Before the building of Shell-Haus, the Tiergarten section of Berlin was primarily the location of expensive, elegant and luxurious private residences. Afterwards, and after World War II, the area housed more offices, with some of the former townhouses and villas gone and others having been converted to office use. The street itself became a significant connecting thoroughfare.

During the Second World War Shell-Haus was used by the Oberkommando der Marine (Naval High Command) and the cellars were converted into a makeshift hospital.

Despite the upper floors being damaged in the Battle of Berlin at the close of the war, Shell-Haus was one of Berlin’s few great edifices to survive the widespread destruction of the city relatively unscathed. After clearing away the war damage, in 1946 the Berlin electricity board BEWAG made Shell-Haus its head office.

In 1958 Shell-Haus was designated an historical monument by the West German Deutsche Stiftung Denkmalschutz. However, this acknowledgement of its architectural importance did not save the building from post-war dilapidation, and it remained in a degraded state for many years to follow.

Between 1965 and 1967, the Shell-Haus site was extended northwards with the construction of two similarly steel-framed buildings designed by the German architect Paul Baumgarten. Being comparatively conventional and unremarkable in design, they were not included under the original building’s historical monument protection, and a 1995 application to rectify this was quashed.

== Renovation ==
When the subject of the building's long overdue restoration was raised in the 1980s, progress was hampered by a dispute over the investment needed that continued into the mid-1990s. Renovation work had been carried out on the courtyard façade in the early 80s but this had failed to meet the required standards.

In 1995 Bewag moved out of Shell-Haus in readiness for the renovation project. In 1997, after 13 years of discord, the restoration work began. At the time the total cost was estimated at around 50 million deutschmarks. but by the time work was completed in February 2000, the expenditure had escalated to around 80 million marks. A major contributory factor to the considerable expense was the need to reopen the Longarina quarry near Rome, owned by company CIMEP in Tivoli, in order to supply the appropriate travertine rock for the building façade.

The expenditure and painstaking detail invested in Shell-Haus did not go unrewarded – the year 2000 saw the renovation work awarded the monument preservation prize, the Ferdinand von Quast Medal.

In March 2000 the Berlin energy supplier GASAG became the new owner and occupant of Shell-Haus.

== Admirers and detractors ==
Shell-Haus has several high-profile fans including the acclaimed German film director Wim Wenders – who featured the building in his 1970 directorial debut Summer in the City – and the architect Meinhard von Gerkan, who said that for him it was the most beautiful building in Berlin.

On the other hand, one of the only times on record that Adolf Hitler criticised a specific building in Berlin, as opposed to modern urban architecture in general, was when he insulted Fahrenkamp with "You're the man who committed the crime of the Shell Building." Despite this criticism, Fahrenkamp received some commissions for exhibition buildings, and had dealings with Propaganda Minister Joseph Goebbels, Hermann Göring, the head of the Luftwaffe and the Four Year Plan, and Albert Speer, Hitler's favorite architect and later Minister of Armaments and War Production.
