= United States Post Office (Glen Cove, New York) =

- US Post Office-Glen Cove
- U.S. National Register of Historic Places
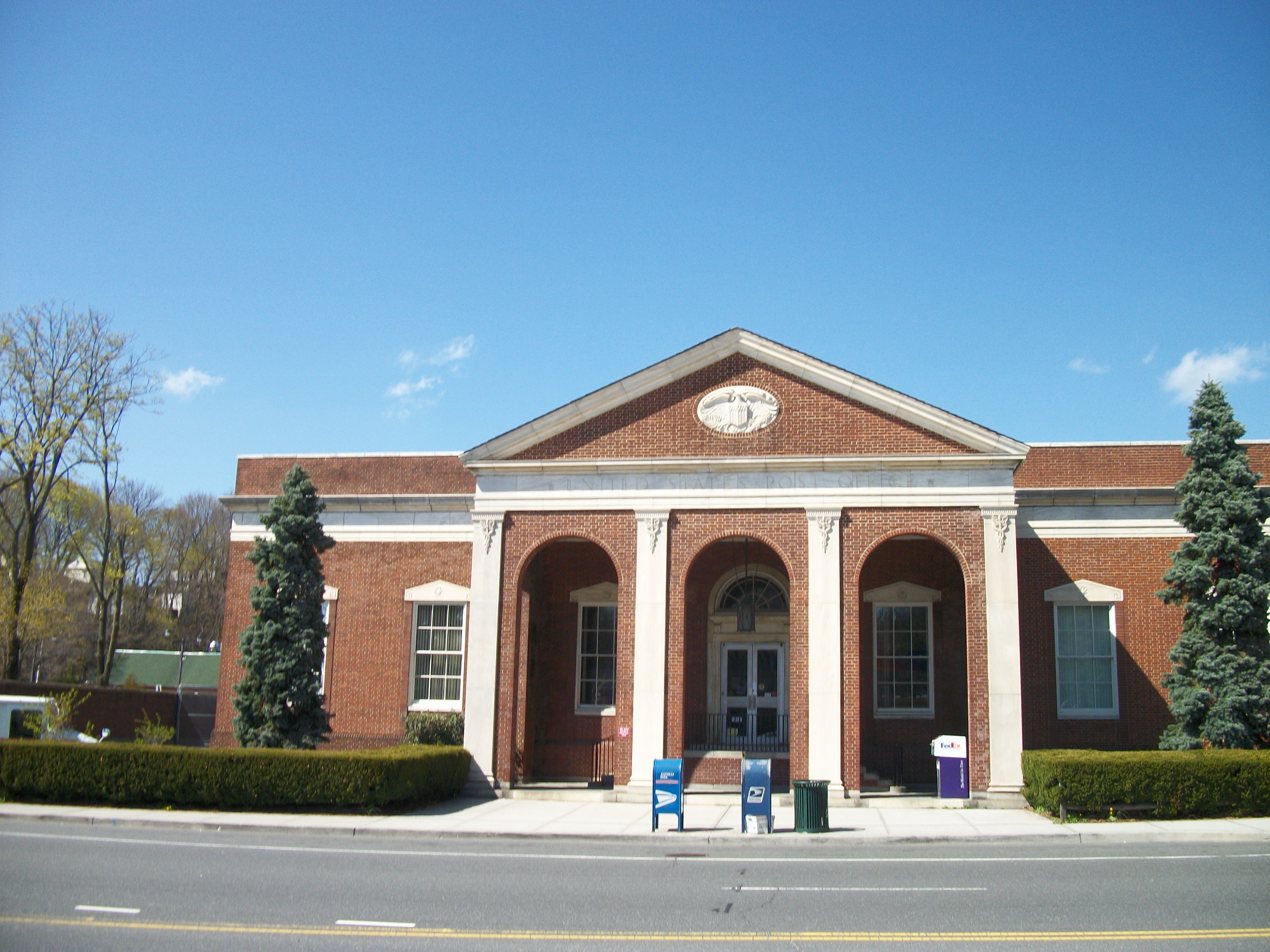
- The Glen Cove Post Office as seen from New York State Route 107

- Location within Long Island Location within New York Location within the United States
- Interactive map showing the location for U.S. Post Office-Glen Cove
- Location: 2 Glen Cove St., Glen Cove, New York
- Coordinates: 40°51′46″N 73°38′1″W
- Area: less than one acre
- Built: 1932
- Architect: Delano & Aldrich
- Architectural style: Colonial Revival
- MPS: US Post Offices in New York State, 1858-1943, TR
- NRHP reference No.: 88002525
- Added to NRHP: May 11, 1989

U.S. Post Office-Glen Cove is a historic post office building located at 2 Glen Cove Avenue (the NRHP mistakenly has the address as Glen Cove Street) and Bridge Street in the City of Glen Cove, Nassau County, New York, United States.

== Description ==
It was built in 1932 during the Great Depression as a replacement for the Old Glen Cove Post Office on 51 Glen Street. The latter, now the headquarters of the Smiros & Smiros architectural firm, was added to the NRHP in 2010.

The current post office was designed by consulting architects Delano and Aldrich for the Office of the Supervising Architect of the Department of Treasury, whose responsibilities then included construction of federal buildings. It is a small one-story, brick building with marble trim in the Colonial Revival style. The front facade features three tall brick arches flanked by Doric order marble pilasters.

The current Glen Cove Post Office was listed on the National Register of Historic Places in 1989.

== See also ==
- United States Post Office (Garden City, New York)
- United States Post Office (Great Neck, New York)
- United States Post Office (Mineola, New York)
