= Old Glen Cove Post Office =

- Glen Cove Post Office
- U.S. National Register of Historic Places
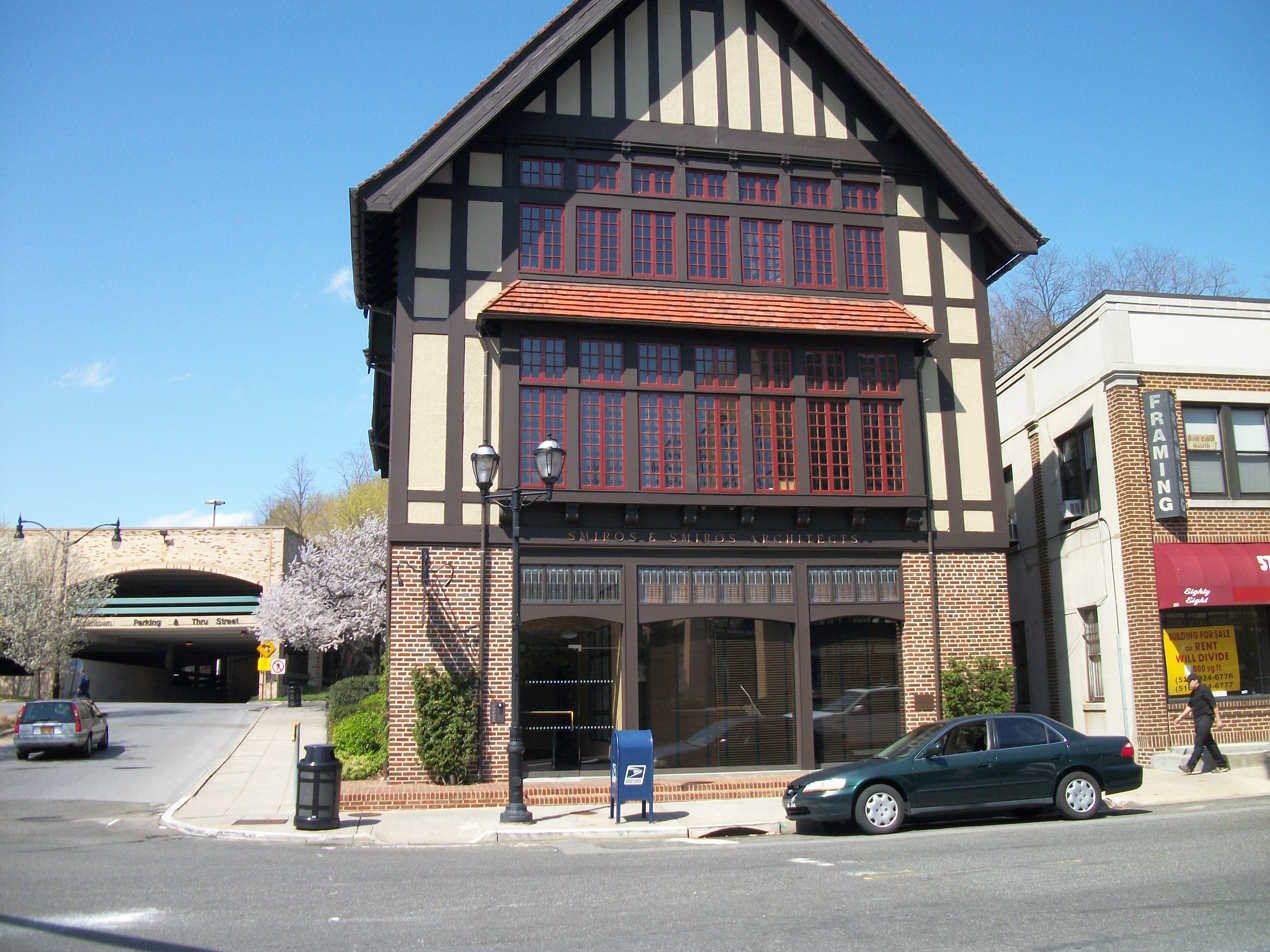
- Old Glen Cove Post Office, April 2011

- Location within New York Location within the United States
- Location: 51 Glen St., Glen Cove, New York
- Coordinates: 40°51′50″N 73°37′46″W
- Area: Less than 1 acre (0.40 ha)
- Built: 1905, 1915
- Architect: Stephen Voorhees
- Architectural style: Tudor Revival
- NRHP reference No.: 10000957
- Added to NRHP: November 29, 2010

Old Glen Cove Post Office is a historic post office building located at Glen Cove in Nassau County, New York. It was designed by Stephen Voorhees, then with the architecture firm Eidlitz & McKenzie, and built in 1905. It is a three-story Tudor Revival influenced building. It measures 36 feet wide and 70 feet deep, with a rear addition constructed in 1915. The first floor facade is brick, while the two upper stories have applied timbers with stucco infill and French casement windows. The original Glen Cove Post Office building was replaced with the existing building on 2 Glen Cove Avenue in 1932. The old post office is now the headquarters of the Smiros & Smiros architectural firm.

It was listed on the National Register of Historic Places in 2010.
