= Emil Fahrenkamp =

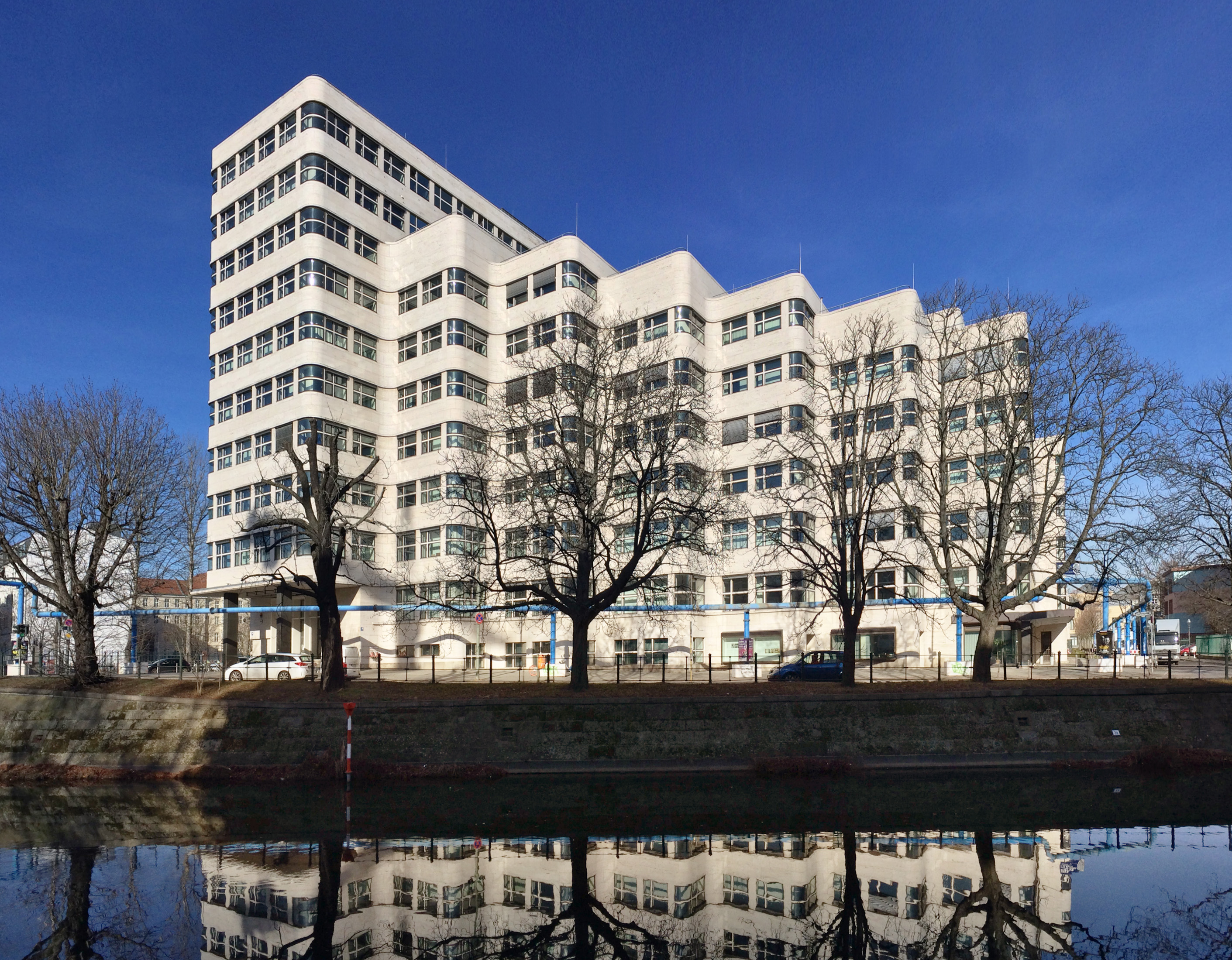
Shell-Haus in Berlin

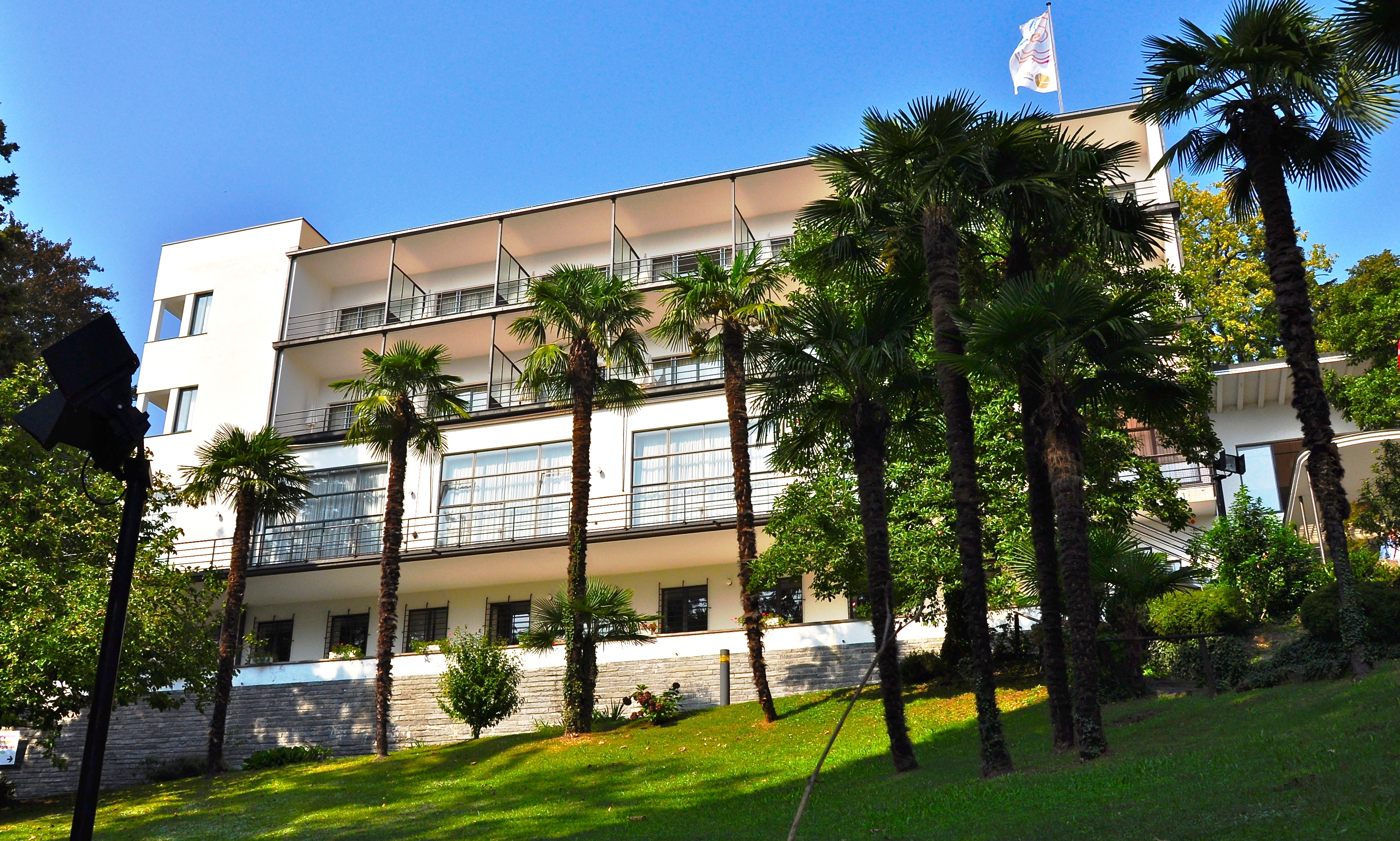
Hotel Monte Verità (Ascona - Switzerland)

Emil Fahrenkamp (November 8, 1885, Aachen – May 24, 1966, Ratingen-Breitscheid) was a German architect and professor. One of the most prominent architects of the period between the first and second World Wars, he is best known for his 1931 Shell-Haus in Berlin.

== Life and career ==
Born in Aachen, Fahrenkamp came to Düsseldorf to work in the office of Wilhelm Kreis from 1909 to 1912. He became an assistant, then professor, at the Düsseldorf Academy of Art. His work in the 1920s and early 1930s was an integration of progressive Neues Bauen—simplified forms, flat roofs, repeated window patterns—with features of traditional styles.

The Shell-Haus is widely considered Fahrenkamp's masterpiece, and one of the most significant office block designs of the Weimar Republic. It didn't escape criticism, however: One of the only times Adolf Hitler inveighed against a specific building in Berlin, as opposed to modern urban architecture in general, was when he told Fahrenkamp, "You're the man who committed the crime of the Shell Building." Despite this, Fahrenkamp received Nazi commissions for exhibition buildings, and had dealings with Propaganda Minister Joseph Goebbels; Hermann Göring, the head of the Luftwaffe and the Four Year Plan; and Albert Speer, Hitler's favorite architect and later Minister of Armaments and War Production. When Fahrenkamp was "de-Nazified" after the war, he remained active as an architect but withdrew from public life.

He died on May 24, 1966, leaving behind a wife and two daughters.

== See also ==
- Denazification
