= Shell House (Western Australia) =

Area of coastal cliffs in Western Australia

Coordinates: 27°48′S 114°7′E

Designations

Register of the National Estate
- Official name: Shell House Cliffs
- Type: Natural
- Designated: 21 March 1978
- Reference no.: 19029
- Place File Number: 5/03/144/0003

Shell House is an area of coastal cliffs located between Red Bluff and Bluff Point in Kalbarri National Park in Mid West Western Australia. They are highly regarded for their scenery, and also for the exposures of geological strata, which include Ordovician Tumblagooda sandstone, Triassic Wittecarra sandstone and Kockatea shale. The Shell House cliffs have been listed on Australia's Register of the National Estate since 1978.
