= The Shell House =

Historic house in New York, United States

- U.S. National Register of Historic Places
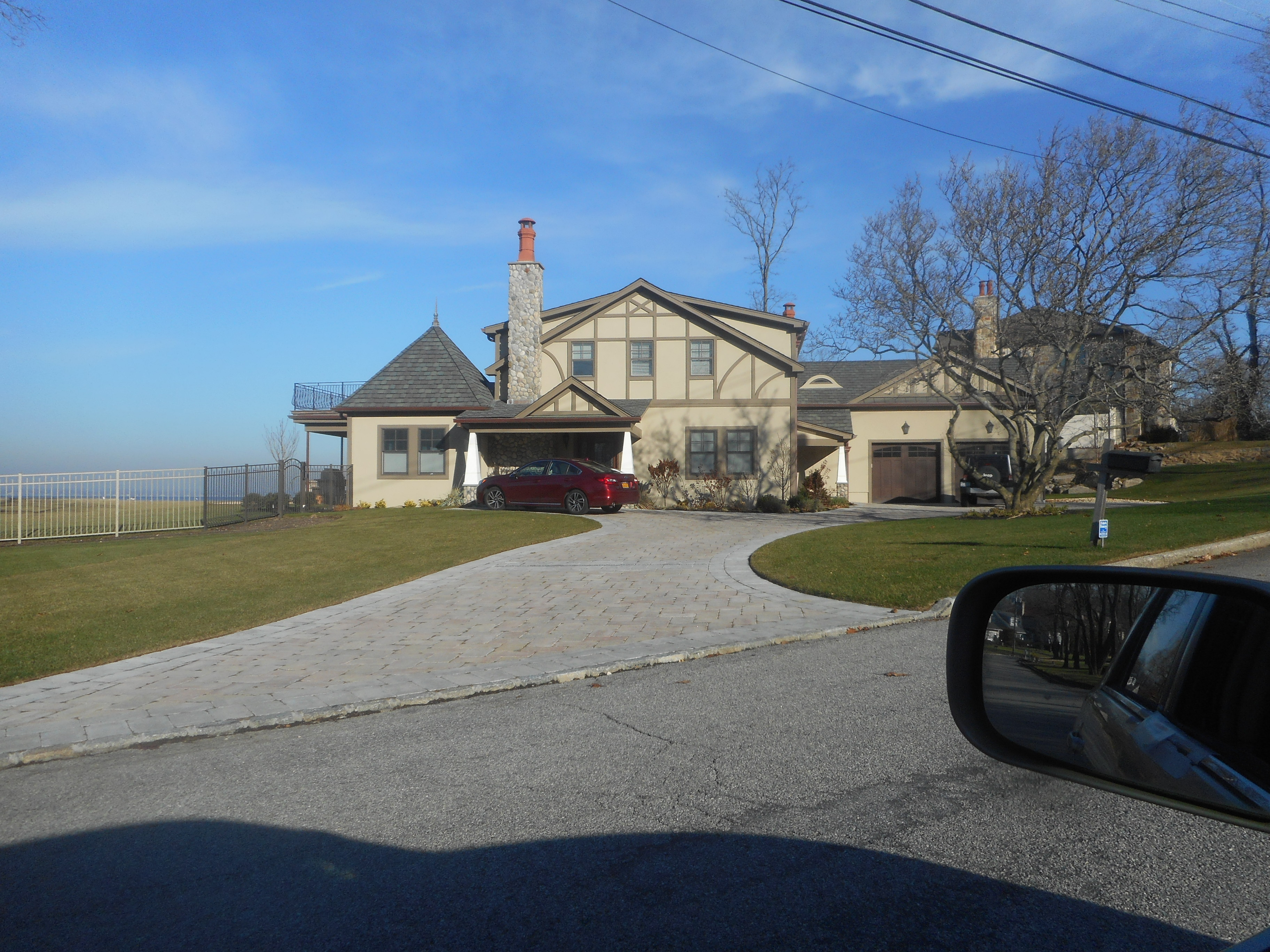
- The remodeled Shell House in November 2019

- Location within New York Location within the United States
- Nearest city: Glen Cove, New York
- Coordinates: 40°53′52″N 73°38′3″W
- Area: 1 acre (0.40 ha)
- Built: 1910
- Architectural style: Tudor Revival
- NRHP reference No.: 88000600
- Added to NRHP: June 2, 1988

The Shell House is a historic home located at 26 Westland Drive on East Island in Glen Cove in Nassau County, New York. It was built as a guest cottage and home of the yacht captain on the Matinecock Point Estate of J. P. Morgan, Jr. (1867–1943). The house is composed of a small, Norman style core dated to the mid-19th century, with a large Tudor Revival addition built about 1910. Also on the property are the remains of a pier and a poured concrete and cinder block wall.

It was listed on the National Register of Historic Places in 1988. The house was rebuilt in the late-2010s.
