= East Hampton Union Free School District =

School district in the U.S. state of New York

Address
- 4 Long Lane East Hampton, Suffolk County, New York; United States
- Coordinates: 40.9701°N 72.2001°W

District information
- Type: Public
- Grades: PK-12
- President: James P. Foster
- Vice-president: Christina DeSanti
- Superintendent: Adam Fine
- Asst. superintendent(s): Timothy Fromm
- Business administrator: Sam M. Schneider
- Schools: 3
- Budget: $75,157,245 (2021-22)
- NCES District ID: 3609660
- District ID: 580301020000

Students and staff
- Students: 1,790 (2019-20)
- Faculty: 186.14 FTE (2019-20)
- Staff: 186.45 FTE (2019-20)
- Student–teacher ratio: 9.62 (2019-20)
- District mascot: Bonackers

Other information
- Website: easthamptonschools.org

East Hampton Union Free School District is a public school district located in the Town of East Hampton on Long Island, in Suffolk County, New York, United States. It includes the village of East Hampton, the unincorporated area just north of the village, and the hamlet of Northwest Harbor.

The total enrollment for the 2019–2020 school year was 1,712 students. The current superintendent, Adam Fine, assumed the position on July 1, 2021. Previously, he served as Assistant Superintendent for one year and was the high school principal for 10 years. Fine replaced Robert Burns, who had served as superintendent since 2011.

East Hampton is bordered by the Springs and Amagansett districts to the east, and the Wainscott and Sag Harbor districts to the west.

== History ==
East Hampton's first school dates back to the 17th century, where the school was one of four public buildings in a village of 50-60 homes. The state-chartered Clinton Academy operated a one-room schoolhouse from about 1785 to 1881.

The modern school district traces back to 1894, when the first school opened on Newtown Lane. By 1924, primary and secondary grades were in two neighboring buildings. Elementary students left the campus in 1961 and high school students left the campus in 1970, turning the remaining building into the East Hampton Middle School.

== Enrollment ==
The total enrollment for the 2012-2013 school year was 897 students. In the 2016-2017 school year, the East Hampton School District reported to the New York State Education Department it had 1,848 students in prekindergarten through twelfth grade.

The district also educates secondary students from the Amagansett, Montauk, Sagaponack, Springs, and Wainscott school districts, none of which have their own high school. Proposals have been made to merge the nearby districts, but have not been adopted.

The high school football team also includes students from Pierson High School in Sag Harbor and Bridgehampton School in Bridgehampton.

== Schools ==
- East Hampton High School, located at 2 Long Lane, serves grades 9 through 12 and is the easternmost high school in the state of New York. In the 2019–20 school year, there were 920 students. The current principal is Sara Smith. The current high school campus opened in 1970, and a $49 million expansion was completed in 2010.
- East Hampton Middle School, located at 76 Newtown Lane, serves grades 6 through 8. In the 2019–20 school year, there were 342 students. The current principal is Charles Soriano. The building was built in 1910 and enlarged in 1963.
- John M. Marshall Elementary School, located at 3 Gingerbread Lane, serves pre-K through grade 5. In the 2019–20 school year, there were 450 students. The current principal is Karen Kuneth. The building opened in 1961.

== Notable alumni ==
- Bran Ferren, designer, inventor and special visual effects director at The Walt Disney Company
- Ross Gload, baseball player for the Philadelphia Phillies
- Paul Annacone, tennis player and coach
- Howard Wood, basketball player
