= Sag Harbor Union Free School District =

Public school district in New York, US

Address
- 200 Jermain Avenue Sag Harbor, Suffolk County, New York; United States
- Coordinates: 40°59′39.42″N 72°17′19.77″W

District information
- Type: Public
- Grades: PK-12
- Established: 1862
- President: Sandi Kruel
- Vice-president: Jordana Sobey
- Superintendent: Jeff Nichols
- Business administrator: Jennifer Buscemi
- Governing agency: New York State Education Department
- Schools: 2
- Budget: $44,871,539 (2021-22)
- NCES District ID: 3625380
- District ID: 580305020000

Students and staff
- Students: 919 (2019-20)
- Teachers: 108.66 FTE (2019-20)
- Staff: 96.93 FTE (2019-20)
- Student–teacher ratio: 8.84 (2019-20)
- District mascot: Whalers; Bonackers (Football)
- Colors: Red and Black

Other information
- Website: sagharborschools.org

Sag Harbor Union Free School District is a public school district located primarily in the Town of Southampton, with a small portion in the Town of East Hampton, on Long Island, in Suffolk County, New York, United States. It services the villages of Sag Harbor and North Haven, the majority of the hamlet of Noyack, as well as portions of the unincorporated communities of Sag Harbor and Sagaponack.

The total enrollment for the 2019–2020 school year was 919 students.

Sag Harbor is bordered by the Southampton and Bridgehampton school districts to the southwest, the Sagaponack and Wainscott districts to the south, and the East Hampton district to the southeast.

== History ==
Sag Harbor's original school district, the Union School District, was founded in 1862. The Union School operated out of a building on Main Street that now serves as the village's municipal building.

In 2015–2016, the Sag Harbor School District was designated as a Reward School by New York State Education Commissioner MaryEllen Elia.

In 2015, Sag Harbor UFSD ranked #21 of all school districts on Long Island in average SAT score.

The current superintendent, Jeff Nichols, has held the role since May 2020. Nichols was the high school principal for 20 years and filled in as Acting Superintendent twice in 2019. The prior superintendent, Katy Graves, left in January 2020 to become the director of the nearby Eleanor Whitmore Early Childhood Center in East Hampton. The district's offices are on the site of the Middle-High School at 200 Jermain Avenue.

== Schools ==
- Pierson Middle-High School, located at 200 Jermain Avenue, serves grades 6 through 12. In the 2019–2020 school year, there were 535 students. The current principal is Brittany Carriero. The school is named for Abraham Pierson, an ancestor of local philanthropist Margaret Olivia Slocum Sage whose provided funds in 1907 for the construction of a new school building.
- Sag Harbor Elementary School, located at 68 Hampton Street, serves grades K through 5. In the 2019–20 school year, there were 384 students. The current principal is Matthew Malone.
- The Sag Harbor Learning Center, located at 130 Division Street, houses the district's pre-kindergarten division. The full-day program operates under the auspices of the elementary school and began in September 2021. The building was purchased by the district in December 2016 at a cost of $3.3 million. For the 2020–2021 school year, the building also housed the kindergarten class to allow for greater social distancing in the Elementary School due to the COVID-19 pandemic.
