= Pierson Middle-High School =

Location
- 200 Jermain Avenue; Sag Harbor, Suffolk County, New York; United States; 40°59′39.42″N 72°17′19.77″W

Information
- Other name: Pierson Middle/High School
- Type: Public middle and high school
- Established: 1908
- School district: Sag Harbor Union Free School District
- NCES School ID: 362538003514
- Principal: Brittany Carriero
- Faculty: 66.67 FTE (2019-20)
- Grades: 6-12
- Enrollment: 535 (2019-20)
- Student to teacher ratio: 8.02 (2019-20)
- Colors: Red and Black
- Mascot: Whalers; Bonackers (Football)
- Publication: Singularity
- Newspaper: The Hypothetical
- Communities served: Sag Harbor, North Haven, Noyack, Sagaponack (part)
- Website: Middle-High School

Pierson Middle-High School is a middle and high school located in Sag Harbor, Suffolk County, New York. Serving students in grades 6 through 12, it is the sole secondary school in the Sag Harbor Union Free School District.

Pierson Middle-High School currently offers students the option to take Advanced Placement (AP) and International Baccalaureate (IB) courses. Pierson is one of only nine schools on Long Island to offer the IB Diploma Program.

The school mascot is the "Whalers," paying homage to the village's history as a major whaling port. Students play football at East Hampton High School as the Bonackers, in a consortium that also includes the Bridgehampton School. Bridgehampton in turn sends athletes from some other sports to play at Pierson.

== History ==
The school was completed in 1908 at the cost of $102,000. The financing was gifted by Olivia Slocum Sage and was named for her maternal ancestor Abraham Pierson, one of the early European settlers of Southampton.

For the 2018 and 2019 seasons, low enrollment in East Hampton prompted Pierson to send its football players to Southampton High School.

== Academics ==
In the 2009 Newsweek magazine's annual list of the Top 1200 American High Schools, Pierson Middle-High School is ranked 676th.

In 2015, Niche ranked Pierson Middle-High School 49th overall in New York State with an A+ overall rating.

In 2015–2016, the Sag Harbor School District was designated as a Reward School by New York State Education Commissioner MaryEllen Elia.

In 2015, Sag Harbor UFSD ranked #21 of all school districts on Long Island in average SAT score.

In 2018, Pierson Middle School began offering a new course called “Preparing Learners for a New Tomorrow” or PLANT. This course asks students to assess the credibility of information, use quantitative reasoning, and "take ownership of their own learning.".

In 2023, Pierson Middle High School adopted a cellphone ban in middle and high school. Students must use a Yondr pouch to secure their cell phones and smart watches at the start of each school day. The pouches are unlocked at dismissal.

== Notable alumni ==
- Kyle McGowin, baseball player
- Peter Browngardt, American animator, writer, voice actor, and producer
- Sara Hartman, musician
- Fred W. Thiele Jr., American politician
- Jake Swirbul, co-founder of Grumman Aircraft Engineering Corporation
- William Mulvihill, author, screenwriter, teacher, environmentalist, historian
