= Ross School (East Hampton, New York) =

Location
- 18 Goodfriend Drive; East Hampton, Suffolk County, New York 11937; United States
- 40.969408°N 72.2406°W

Information
- School type: Private Boarding, Day
- Motto: Know Thyself in Order to Serve
- Established: Upper School, 1991; Lower School, 2006
- Founder: Courtney Sale Ross; Steven J. Ross
- Head of Upper School: Mark Frankel
- Head of Lower School: Bryan Rosenberg
- Faculty: Upper School: 55 full-time, 10 part-time Lower School: 20 full-time, 9 part-time
- Grades: Upper School: Grades 7–12; Lower School, Pre-Nursery–Grade 6
- Gender: Co-ed
- Color: Navy
- Team name: Ravens
- Accreditation: Middle States Association, Middle States Association International Credential, Absolute Charter from New York State, Green Schools Alliance
- Tuition: Boarding: (Grade 6-Post Graduate): $76,870 (Domestic); $79,030 (International); $71,870 (5-day) Day: (Grade 5-Post Graduate): $44,110; (Kindergarten): $36,390
- Affiliation: Independent Day (Grades Pre-Nursery–12, and Boarding School (Grades 6–12)
- Website: ross.org

Ross School is a private Nursery-Grade12 school located on two campuses on Long Island, New York, United States—a 63-acre Upper School campus for Grades 6–12 in the Town of East Hampton, and a Lower School campus for N-Grade 5 in the hamlet of Bridgehampton. Named after her late husband Steven J. Ross, the school was founded in 1991 by Courtney Sale Ross as a girls-only day school for their daughter Nicole and several of her friends. The original pre-nursery program was discontinued in September 2020. Ross School transitioned to a co-ed boarding school in 2002 after its founder discontinued private funding. Students in grades 7-12 may board five days per week or full-time. The school has supplemented its budget by catering breakfast and lunch from its café to the Bridgehampton School and offering culinary arts and landscaping classes to East Hampton High School students.

A majority of the student body is international, with the highest-represented nations including Brazil, China, Japan, and Mexico.

== Summer events and programs ==
The Ross School hosts an annual fundraising event in June which has featured Aretha Franklin, the Jonas Brothers, Martha Stewart, Cyndi Lauper and Seth Meyers. The largest event to date was held in 2007: a series of five musical concerts entitled "Social @ Ross" with Prince; Dave Matthews and Tim Reynolds; Billy Joel; James Taylor and Tom Petty and the Heartbreakers. The price of a ticket to the series was $15,000.

Ross Summer Term offers summer courses for middle and high school students. They can earn academic credits in ESOL, STEAM, Math, English, and Cultural History and or enroll in enrichment courses and tutoring services in different subjects including Math, Science, ESOL, Studio Art, SAT Prep, and others.

== Ross Institute ==
In 1996, Courtney Sale Ross founded Ross Institute for Advanced Study and Innovation in Education. The Institute provides training and certification for teachers interested in establishing schools based on the Ross School model. Mentors associated with Ross Institute include economist Jeremy Rifkin, scientist and engineer Danny Hillis, sociologist Pedro Noguera, neuroscientists Antonio and Hanna Damasio, paleoanthropologist Yves Coppens, and sociologist and media scholar Sherry Turkle. Among the universities and organizations that have worked with the Institute are Harvard's Graduate School of Education; NYU's Steinhardt School of Culture, Education, and Human Development; University of Southern California; Smithsonian Institution, Moorea Biocode Project, Moorea IDEA, and the National Geographic Society.

== 2021 Lawsuit ==
In 2021, former Ross School student Hayden Soloviev and his father, Stefan Soloviev, filed a lawsuit seeking $10 million in compensatory and punitive damages from Ross School, its head of school, and four faculty members. The complaint alleged that Hayden Soloviev had been bullied, harassed, and threatened by faculty members during and after a school trip to South America in 2020.

In December 2021, State Supreme Court Justice William J. Condon dismissed the lawsuit, ruling that the Solovievs had not "shown that any of these allegations hold any weight to create a cause of action on this matter". However, in 2024, the Appellate Division of the New York State Supreme Court overturned the dismissal, ruling that the lower court had erred in dismissing the claims without further proceedings.

In 2026, Ross School and the Solovievs reached a confidential resolution of the lawsuit, with the terms of the agreement remaining private. In a statement published by the school, Ross acknowledged that Soloviev had not felt comfortable returning for his senior year, and that its current administration and board had reviewed its policies, reporting procedures, and oversight measures. The school also created the Hayden Soloviev scholarship for current students' non-tuition costs, citing his leadership and scholarship as a Ross student.

== Notable alumni ==
- Alexa Ray Joel, singer
- Scott Disick, reality television star
- Victoria de Lesseps, artist
- Naomi J. Ogawa, actress
- Tessa Gräfin von Walderdorff, socialite
