= Sagaponack Common School District =

School district in the U.S. state of New York

Address
- 400 Sagg Main Street Sagaponack, Suffolk County, New York; United States

District information
- Type: Public
- Grades: K–3
- Established: 1776
- President: Lauren Thayer
- Vice-president: Thomas Schultz
- Superintendent: John J. Finello
- Business administrator: Eileen Tuohy
- Governing agency: New York State Education Department
- Schools: 1
- Budget: $1,732,664 (2021–22)
- NCES District ID: 3625410
- District ID: 580910080000

Students and staff
- Students: 16 (2019–20)
- Teachers: 2.9 FTE (2019–20)
- Staff: 2.2 FTE (2019–20)
- Student–teacher ratio: 5.52 (2019–20)

Other information
- Website: sagaponackschool.org

Sagaponack Common School District is a public school district located in Sagaponack on Long Island, in Suffolk County, New York, United States. It is roughly co-extensive with the village of Sagaponack, which is part of the town of Southampton.

The district operates one school, the Sagaponack School, serving grades K through 3. Affectionally known as "the little red schoolhouse", the district had a total enrollment of 16 students for the 2019–2020 school year and 11 for 2021–22. It is believed to be one of the last remaining "one room" schoolhouses in America. Students then complete their education at either the Bridgehampton, Sag Harbor, or East Hampton schools.

The school gets rave reviews from parents, who cite its close community, excellent staffing, and extremely strong teacher to student ratio. The district's superintendent is John (Jay) Finello. He replaced the prior superintendent, Alan Van Cott, in July 2021. Finello previously served as superintendent in three other Long Island districts – East Islip, Huntington, and Springs.

Sagaponack is bordered by the Wainscott school district to the east, the Sag Harbor district to the north, and the Bridgehampton district to the west.

== History ==
Sagaponack was originally District 10, the easternmost school district in the town of Southampton in 1720. The first schoolhouse, opened in 1776, was a one-story building on the site of Caleb Pierson's property on Sagg Main Street. A second schoolhouse was described as standing "in the street between the two roads", and was later sold to a farm on the nearby Parsonage Lane, which in turn sold the building to the Wainscott School. The current building was built in 1885 by John B. Hedges. In 1920, a second room was added to the building, though it is still technically a one-room schoolhouse due to the second room's usage as a lunchroom and rainy day play area.

The building is part of the Sagaponack Historic District, a collection of 131 buildings along Sagg Main Street listed on the National Register of Historic Places.

An increase in enrollment during the COVID-19 pandemic prompted the district to lease an additional classroom at the former Most Holy Trinity School in East Hampton. The classroom housed the 2nd and 3rd grade classes for the 2020–2021 school year.
