= Montauk Union Free School District =

School district in New York, United States

Coordinates: 41°2′10″N 71°57′27″W

Montauk Union Free School District is a school district headquartered in Montauk, New York. The district includes Montauk, a community in the Town of East Hampton.

It operates Montauk Public School, a PK-8 school.

In 2024 the district had plans to renovate the school building.

In 2025 the district cooperated with three other area school districts (Amagansett, East Hampton, and Springs) with plans to establish a regional special education program.
