= Frank "Sprig" Gardner =

American wrestling coach (1907–1975)

Frank D. Gardner
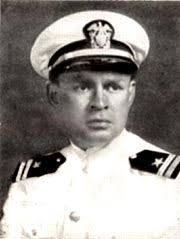
- 1944 photograph of Gardner during his US military service in World War II
- Born: April 8, 1907
- Died: April 8, 1975 (aged 68); East Hampton, New York, US
- Other name: "Sprig"
- Education: F&M College (1930)
- Occupation: Wrestling coach
- Employers: East Hampton High School; Mepham High School; Gettysburg College
- Military career
- Branch: United States Navy
- Years: 1942–1945
- Rank: Lieutenant commander
- Unit: USS Makin Island (CVE-93)
- Conflicts: World War II

Frank D. Gardner (April 8, 1907 – April 8, 1975; nicknamed "Sprig") was an American wrestling coach and US Naval officer in World War II.

== Personal life ==
Born on April 8, 1907, Frank D. Gardner was originally from southern Pennsylvania. In 1930, he graduated from Franklin & Marshall College in Lancaster, Pennsylvania.

In adulthood, Gardner was a Quaker and lived with his widowed mother in East Hampton, New York. He died in East Hampton on April 8, 1975.

== Coaching career ==
Gardner first learned about wrestling while studying at Franklin & Marshall College; his roommate was on the varsity wrestling team, there.

He arrived at East Hampton High School in 1930 to coach baseball and American football. Gardner's successful coaching led to three of his students' enshrinement in the school's hall of fame. He began the school's wrestling program in 1933.

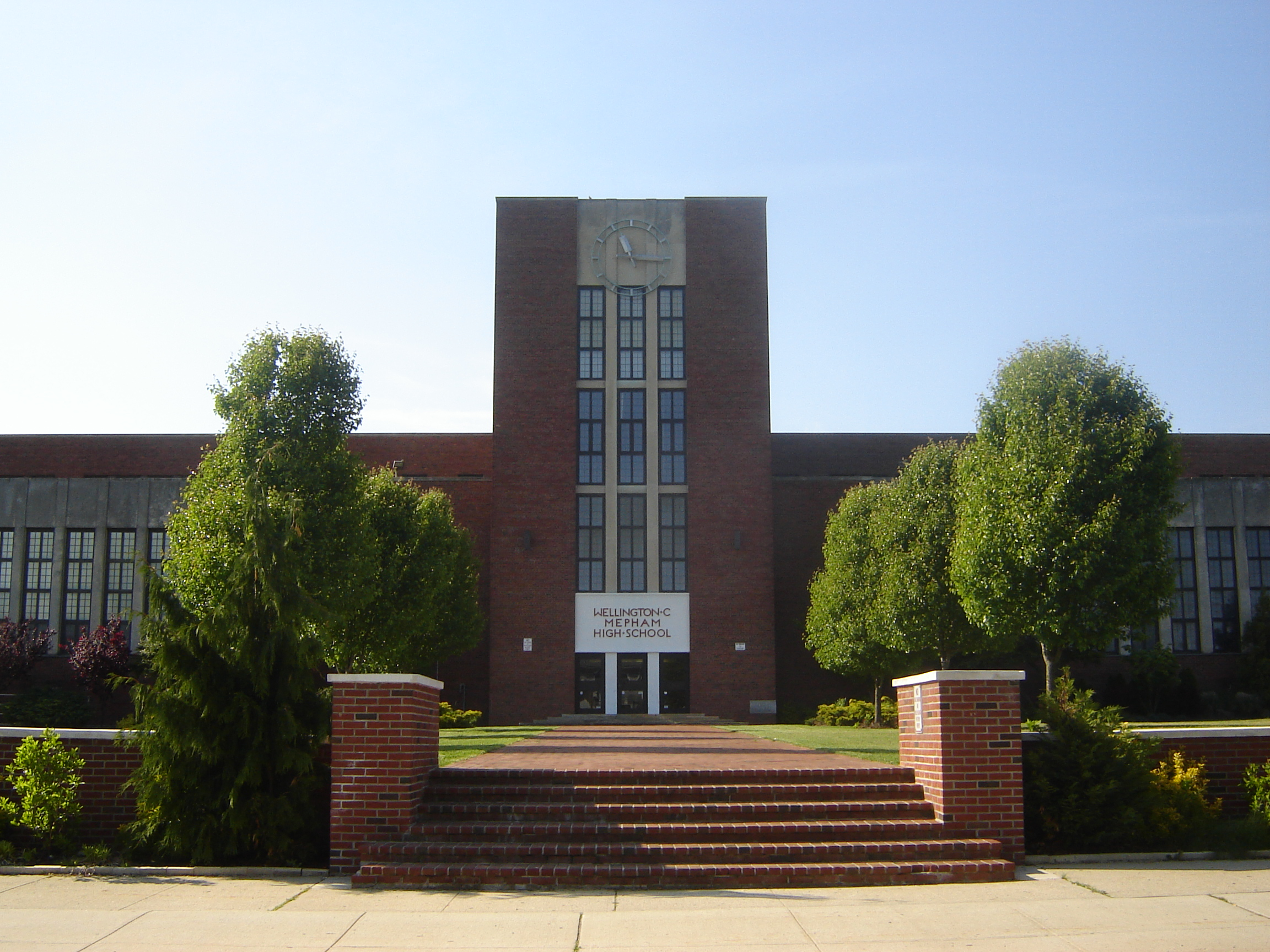
Mepham High School in 2007

In 1936 or 1937, Gardner was hired by North Bellmore, New York's Wellington C. Mepham High School to coach both football and wrestling; the program was first organized in an abandoned elementary school. While there, Gardner developed the practice concept of "chain moves and drilling", which led to 20 years of undefeated Mephan students in dual meets and only one tournament loss. Mephan wrestling alumni were recruited by colleges, and Gardner taught his methods to wrestling coaches across Long Island. He left the school in 1958.

Gardner was a significant force in the spread of New York high school wrestling, especially in Long Island. He would travel with his team to new high schools, and demonstrate his values of wrestling by teaching and drilling basic skills at assemblies.

In the early 1960s, Gardner later spent two years at Gettysburg College, rebuilding the school's wrestling program. At the college, he also hosted an annual summer wrestling school for area secondary-school students.

=== Legacy ===
Despite having never wrestled, Gardner's lifetime coaching record included 254 wins, five losses, and one tie. His wrestlers won 106 sectional championships, 40 tournament titles, one co-title, and three second-places. His influence was widespread enough that he "effected rules concerning weight classifications, match scoring procedures, and tournament procedures at local, state, and national levels."

Gardner was a 1986 distinguished inductee to the National Wrestling Hall of Fame and Museum, and as of 2015, the only high-school coach so honored. On May 7, 1987, he was inducted into the Long Island Sports Hall of Fame, as well. In 1992, he was inducted into the Franklin & Marshall Athletic Hall of Fame. As of December 2022, the annual Sprig Gardner Wrestling Tournament was still being held, then in its 46th year. In 2016, the Nassau County Public High School Athletic Association inducted Gradner into its Nassau County High School Athletics Hall of Fame. The organization Friends of Long Island Wrestling called Gardner the "Father of New York State Wrestling".

== US military ==
After the attack on Pearl Harbor, Gardner eschewed an instructor's deferment from the World War II draft, and pursued an officer's commission into the United States Navy in early-to-mid 1942. He spent three years as a lieutenant commander, serving aboard the aircraft carrier USS Makin Island in the South West Pacific theatre.
