= Sagaponack, New York =

- Village
- Incorporated Village of Sagaponack
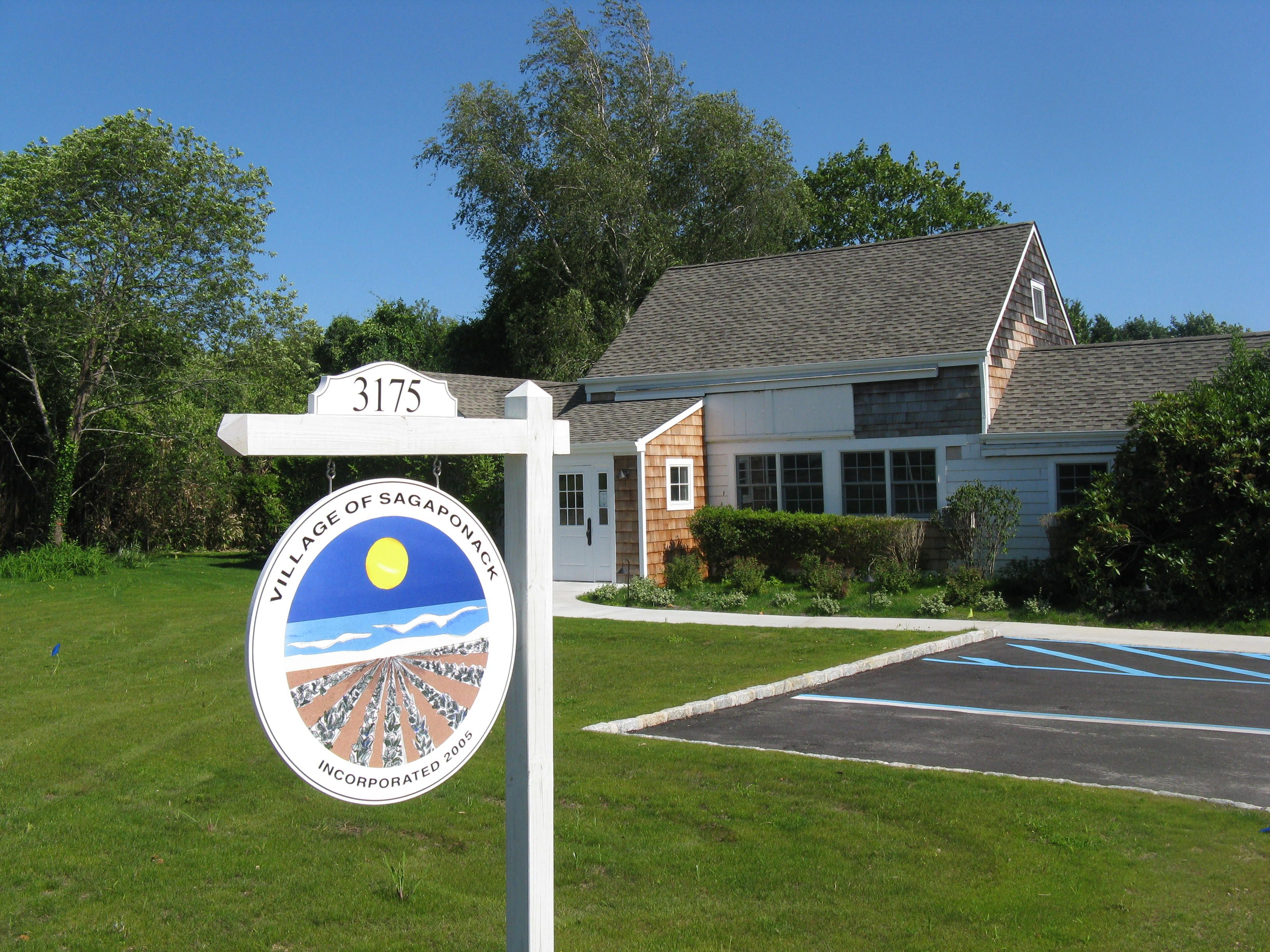
- Sagaponack Village Hall, located at 3175 Montauk Highway in Sagaponack.

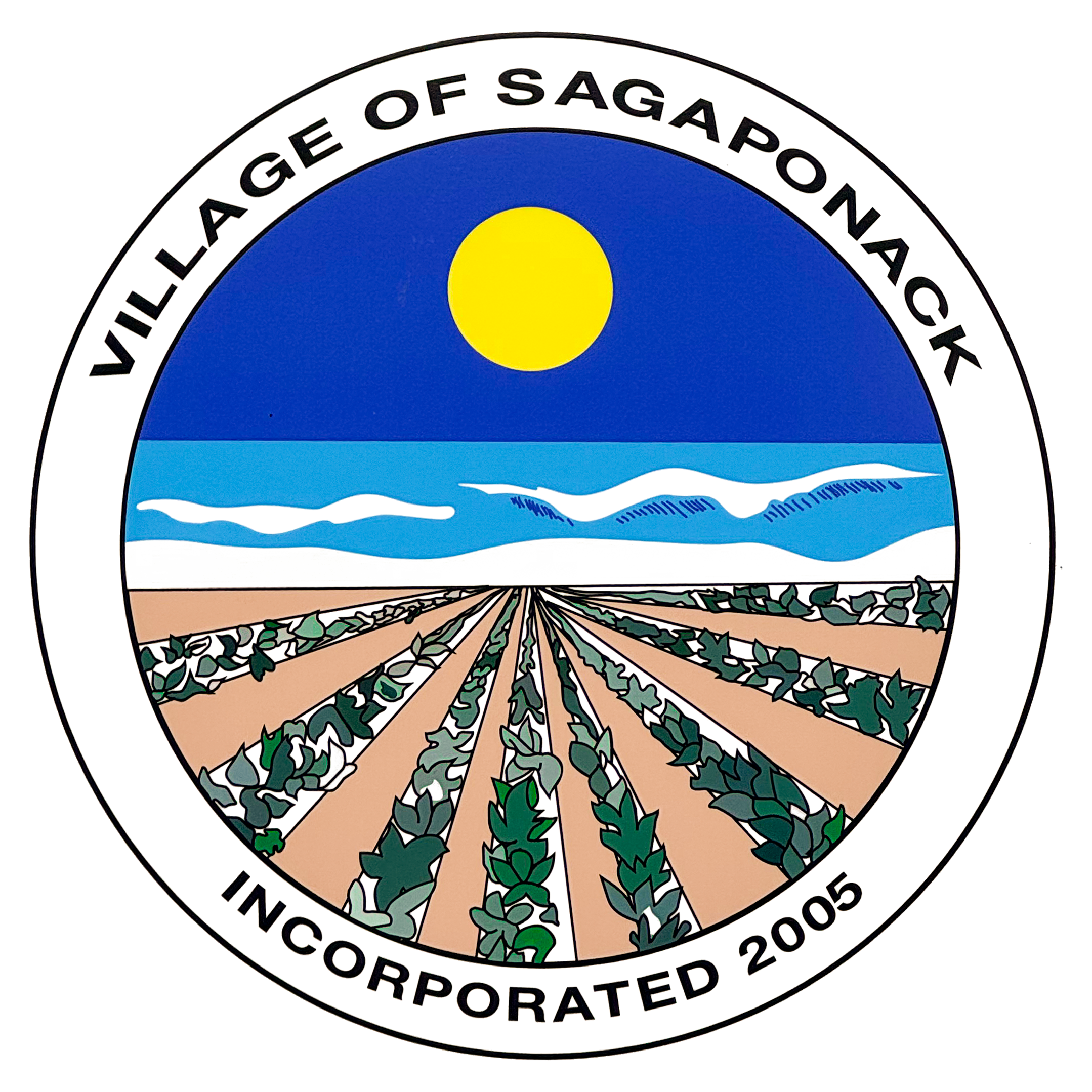
- Seal
- Nickname: Sagg
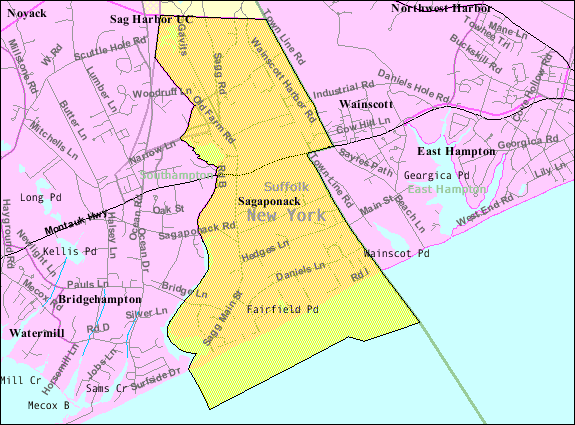
- U.S. Census map of Sagaponack.

- Location on Long Island Location within the state of New York
- Coordinates: 40°56′31″N 72°16′52″W
- Country: United States
- State: New York
- County: Suffolk
- Town: Southampton
- First settled: 1653
- Incorporated: 2005

Government
  - Mayor: William F. Tillotson
  - Deputy Mayor: Lisa Duryea Thayer

Area
  - Total: 4.65 sq mi (12.05 km^{2})
  - Land: 4.41 sq mi (11.42 km^{2})
  - Water: 0.24 sq mi (0.63 km^{2})
- Elevation: 23 ft (7 m)

Population (2020)
  - Total: 770
  - Density: 174.6/sq mi (67.42/km^{2})
- Time zone: UTC−5 (Eastern (EST))
  - Summer (DST): UTC−4 (EDT)
- ZIP Code: 11962
- Area codes: 631, 934
- FIPS code: 36-64452
- GNIS feature ID: 0963225
- Website: www.sagaponackvillage.org

Sagaponack (/ˌsæɡəˈpɒnək/ SAG-ə-PON-ək) is a village in the Town of Southampton in Suffolk County, on the East End of Long Island, in New York, United States. The population of the village was 770 at the 2020 census. In 2015, Sagaponack was the second wealthiest zip code in the United States.

== History ==
The area was first settled around 1653. The village was incorporated on September 2, 2005, in the wake of the failed attempt by Dunehampton, New York to incorporate. Dunehampton's incorporation would have blocked Sagaponack from beaches on the Atlantic Ocean. The villages are seeking to address various beach issues including erosion arising from groynes at Georgica Pond in East Hampton village.

Prior to its incorporation, Sagaponack was a census-designated place, with a population of 582 at the time of the 2000 census, and an area 70% greater than that of the current village.

The name Sagaponack comes from the Shinnecock Nation's word for "land of the big ground nuts", in reference to the Ground Nut (Apios americana). A common misconception is that the name referred to potatoes, the predominant crop grown by farmers who first settled the area. Many of the huge estates in the village were built on former potato fields. Its first settler was Josiah Stanborough in 1656. The village was originally called Sagg.

Sag Harbor, just north of Sagaponack, is believed to have derived its name from the village. West of Sagaponack is a place that the Native Americans called Mecox, now a hamlet on the west side of Sagaponack Lake in the CDP of Bridgehampton.

In July 2015, according to Business Insider, the 11962 ZIP Code encompassing Sagaponack was listed as the most expensive in the U.S., with a median home sale price of $5,125,000, rising to $8,500,000 in the end of the year.

The village was home to many writers and literary business people beginning in the 1950s and 1960s, appreciated for its community living.

== Geography ==
According to the United States Census Bureau, Sagaponack village has a total area of 4.7 square miles (12.1 km^{2}), of which 4.4 square miles (11.4 km^{2}) is land and 0.23 square miles (0.6 km^{2}), or 5.15%, is water.

At the 2000 census, the former, unincorporated Sagaponack CDP had a total area of 8.0 square miles (21 km^{2}), of which 6.2 square miles (16 km^{2}) was land and 1.8 square miles (4.7 km^{2}), or 22.35%, was water.

== Demographics ==
Historical population
Census	Pop.	Note	%±
2010	313		—
2020	770		146.0%
U.S. Decennial Census

As of the census of 2000, there were 582 people, 249 households, and 162 families residing in the CDP. The population density was 93.6 inhabitants per square mile (36.1/km^{2}). There were 734 housing units at an average density of 118.0 per square mile (45.6/km^{2}). The racial makeup of the CDP was 92.78% White, 2.58% African American, 2.58% Asian, 1.55% from other races, and 0.52% from two or more races. Hispanic or Latino of any race were 3.44% of the population.

There were 249 households, out of which 24.9% had children under the age of 18 living with them, 55.0% were married couples living together, 6.8% had a female householder with no husband present, and 34.9% were non-families. Of all households 27.7% were made up of individuals, and 8.4% had someone living alone who was 65 years of age or older. The average household size was 2.34 and the average family size was 2.86.

In the CDP the population was spread out, with 19.4% under the age of 18, 4.0% from 18 to 24, 24.6% from 25 to 44, 33.8% from 45 to 64, and 18.2% who were 65 years of age or older. The median age was 46 years. For every 100 females, there were 102.1 males. For every 100 females age 18 and over, there were 101.3 males.

The median income for a household in the CDP was $54,048, and the median income for a family was $78,707. Males had a median income of $43,750 versus $27,321 for females. The per capita income for the CDP was $44,474. About 1.9% of families and 1.3% of the population were below the poverty line, including 2.5% of those under age 18 and 1.8% of those age 65 or over.

== Government ==
As of September 2022, the Mayor of Sagaponack is William F. Tillotson, the Deputy Mayor is Lisa Duryea Thayer, and the Village Trustees are William Barbour, Marilyn Clark, and Carrie Thayer Crowley.

== Real estate ==
Sagaponack is generally considered to be the most expensive neighborhood in the Hamptons, as well as in the United States as a whole, generally ranking in the top spot on all major surveys. The Sagaponack ZIP Code (11962) was listed as the most expensive in the United States in 2009, and several years thereafter including again in 2018; the median home sale price was $4,421,458, according to Zillow.com and $8.5 million according to PropertyShark.

Sgaponack has been listed by PropertyShark as the most expensive zip code in New York, and the second most expensive after Atherton, CA in the United States, for several years running, and most recently 2026. In the past few years nearby Water Mill (11976) was listed sixth with $2,238,676, and Bridgehampton (11932) was listed eighth with $2,081,717. In 2015 and through to 2018, according to Business Insider, Sagaponack's 11962 ZIP Code was listed as the most expensive in the U.S.

The most expensive homes are in and around Daniels Lane. In 1998, Kurt Vonnegut and Andre Gregory rose at a Board of Zoning appeals hearing to oppose the board's approval of Ira L. Rennert's plans to build a 29-bedroom "single-family house” near Daniels. It is now the largest home in America.

The Elizabeth Reese House designed by Andrew Geller is historically significant in architecture.

== Education ==
Sagaponack is located primarily within the Sagaponack Common School District, which consists of one school: the Sagaponack School. one of the last remaining active one-room schoolhouses in New York State. The building, known locally as the "Little Red School House," educates children from kindergarten through third grade.

After finishing 3rd grade, students attend either schools in the Bridgehampton, the East Hampton, or the Sag Harbor school districts for the remainder of their K-12 education.

Small portions of the village are also located within the boundaries of the Bridgehampton and Wainscott school districts.

== Notable people ==
- Charles Addams (1912–1988), cartoonist
- Drew Barrymore
- Lloyd Blankfein (born 1954), CEO, Goldman Sachs
- Susan Blond, publicist and Warhol movie star
- Sydney Butchkes (1922–2015), artist and designer
- Truman Capote, author
- Jimmy Fallon (born 1974), television host
- Lewis Frankfort, CEO, Coach
- Marc Glimcher, art dealer
- Bo Goldman, (1932-2023) American screenwriter and playwright, received two Academy Awards, two Golden Globe Awards, and two Writers Guild of America Awards.^{[28]}
- Jim Grabb (born 1964), tennis player ranked World No. 1 in doubles in 1989 and 1993
- Billy Joel (born 1949), musician
- Caroline Kennedy (born 1957), former First Daughter, lawyer, author and diplomat
- Peter Matthiessen, author, conservationist and naturalist
- George Plimpton, author
- L.A. Reid, record company executive
- Ira Rennert, investor and businessman
- David Salle, artist
- Roy Scheider, actor
- Axel Stawski, billionaire real estate developer
- Kurt Vonnegut, author

== See also ==
- Sagaponack Historic District – A historic district located within the village.

Preceded by Wainscott	The Hamptons	Succeeded by Bridgehampton
