= Ross Gload =

American baseball player (born 1976)

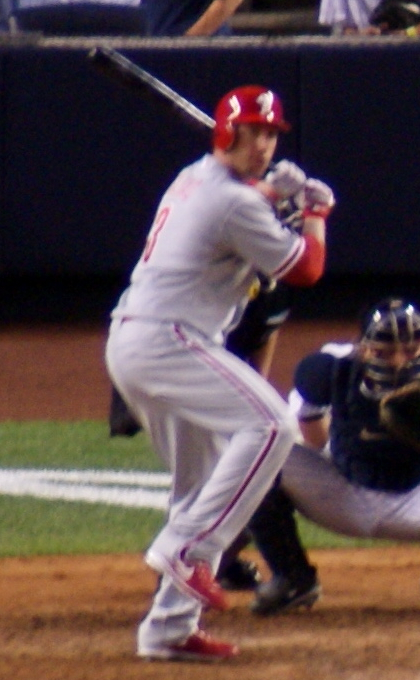
- Gload with the Philadelphia Phillies in 2010
- First baseman / Outfielder
- Born: April 5, 1976 (age 50); Brooklyn, New York, U.S.
- Batted: Left Threw: Left

MLB debut
- August 31, 2000, for the Chicago Cubs

Last MLB appearance
- September 24, 2011, for the Philadelphia Phillies

MLB statistics
- Batting average: .281
- Home runs: 34
- Runs batted in: 222
- Stats at Baseball Reference

Teams
- Chicago Cubs (2000); Colorado Rockies (2002); Chicago White Sox (2004–2006); Kansas City Royals (2007–2008); Florida Marlins (2009); Philadelphia Phillies (2010–2011)

Ross Peter Gload (born April 5, 1976) is an American former professional baseball first baseman and outfielder. He played in Major League Baseball (MLB) for six teams over ten seasons.

== High school/college career ==
Gload grew up in the Long Island community of Springs, New York, where he broke numerous high school and county home run records. After his record-breaking 1994 season for East Hampton High School, Gload was honored with the "Carl Yastrzemski Award," which is annually awarded to the most outstanding high school baseball player in Suffolk County by the Suffolk County Baseball Coaches Association. His 41 career home runs, and 20 in the 1994 season alone, are New York state high school records. Perhaps his most memorable high school moment was the Suffolk County Championship game, where he single-handedly propelled East Hampton to the Long Island Championship with a single and three moonshots off of Kings Park High School's left-handed starter Matthew Ligouri.

Gload attended the University of South Florida, where he played under longtime Coach Eddie Cardieri. In 1995 and 1996, he played collegiate summer baseball with the Hyannis Mets of the Cape Cod Baseball League and was named a league all-star in 1996. He is a member of the USF Athletic Hall of Fame.

== Major league career ==
=== Chicago Cubs ===
Gload was selected in the 13th round of the 1997 amateur draft by the Florida Marlins. On July 31, 2000, at the trade deadline, he was dealt to the Chicago Cubs along with minor leaguer Dave Noyce for Henry Rodriguez. Gload made his Major League debut August 31, 2000 with the Cubs. On September 12, 2001, he was claimed on waivers by the Colorado Rockies but did not play in any big league games that season.

=== New York Mets/Colorado Rockies ===
In January 2002, Gload was involved in two deals with the New York Mets in a span of six days, first moving to the Mets in a three-team, 11-player trade, then having his contract purchased by Colorado from the Mets. Gload batted .258 with a home run and four RBIs in limited action with the Rockies.

=== Chicago White Sox ===
Just before the 2003 season, Gload moved on to the Chicago White Sox organization, being acquired by Chicago for minor leaguer Wade Parrish. Gload did not appear in a Major League uniform in 2003, but in 2004 and again in 2006, he saw significant duty with the White Sox. He batted .321 in 2004 with seven homers and 44 RBIs, finishing seventh in the American League Rookie of the Year voting. In 2006, his numbers were .327 with three homers and 18 RBIs in fewer at-bats. He won his first World Series ring with the White Sox in 2005

=== Kansas City Royals ===
On December 16, 2006, Gload was traded to the Kansas City Royals for relief pitcher Andrew Sisco. In 2007, with Kansas City, Gload logged career highs in at-bats and RBIs, being used as a starter more than in the past. He batted .288 with seven homers and 51 RBIs in 102 games.

During the 2007–2008 offseason, Gload signed a two-year Major League contract with Kansas City.

=== Florida Marlins ===
On April 1, 2009, Gload was traded to the Florida Marlins for a player to be named later.

On May 22, 2009 Gload made his pitching debut, pitching a scoreless ninth inning versus the Tampa Bay Rays. He and Wes Helms set an MLB record for most pinch-hits by a duo.

=== Philadelphia Phillies ===
On December 15, 2009, Gload signed a 2-year, $2.6 million contract with the Philadelphia Phillies. In 2012, Gload's contract with the Phillies expired, making him a free agent.
