= Killer Bees (2017 film) =

- Directed by: Benjamin Cummings; Orson Cummings
- Produced by: Shaquille O'Neal; Glenn Fuhrman; Larry Gagosian; Hilary McHone; Eric Lane; Mara Burros-Sandler
- Edited by: Alex Bayer
- Music by: Moses Truzman
- Release date: October 6, 2017 (Hamptons International Film Festival)
- Running time: 85 minutes
- Country: United States
- Language: English

Killer Bees is an American documentary film directed by Benjamin Cummings & Orson Cummings, and produced by Shaquille O'Neal, Glenn Fuhrman, and Larry Gagosian.

The film chronicles the Bridgehampton School boys basketball team, nicknamed the Killer Bees, through the 2015–2016 season and ultimately reveals the significant impact of racism, income inequality and gentrification within their community nestled in America's wealthiest neighborhood: The Hamptons.

Killer Bees was selected for the 2017 Hamptons International Film Festival, Santa Barbara International Film Festival, International Sports Film Festival of Ohio. In 2018 the film was selected for the Sarasota Film Festival, and the YES Film Festival. The film was awarded the 2018 Jury Prize for Best Documentary at the YES Film Festival.

Killer Bees was named Sports Illustrated's Best Sports Documentaries of 2017 and a New York Times Critic's Pick in 2018 after opening in select theaters in Los Angeles and New York City on July 27, 2018.

Killer Bees has been streamed on Amazon, Hulu, Google Play and iTunes

== Premise ==
Filmmaker brothers Ben and Orson Cummings document the 2015–2016 season of the Bridgehampton School boys basketball team, locally referred to as the Killer Bees. The film reveals the real-life story of hope and hardship within the community.

== Appearances ==
- Carl Johnson (Killer Bees coach, 2016)
- Joe Zucker (Killer Bees Assistant coach, 2016)
- Joshua Lamison (Killer Bees senior, 2016)
- Tylik Furman (Killer Bees senior, 2016)
- Matthew Hostetter (Killer Bees senior, 2016)
- Jamari Gant (Killer Bees senior, 2016)
- Elijah Jackson (Killer Bees junior, 2016)
- JP Harding (Killer Bees Freshman, 2016)
- Dr. Robert North (Activist and organizer)
- Paul Jeffers Jr. (Chairman of the Board, Bridgehampton Child Care & Recreational Center)
- Louis Myrick (Former Killer Bees, class of ‘98)
- Julian Johnson (Former Killer Bees player)
- Vincent Horcasitas (Hamptons real estate broker)
