= Amagansett Union Free School District =

School district in the U.S. state of New York

Amagansett Common School District

Address
- 320 Main Street Amagansett, Suffolk County, New York; United States

District information
- Type: Public
- Grades: PK–6
- Established: 1813
- President: Addie Slater-Davison
- Vice-president: Kristen V. Peterson
- Superintendent: Michael Rodgers
- Business administrator: Thomas Mager
- Governing agency: New York State Education Department
- Schools: 1
- Budget: $11,909,189 (2021–22)
- NCES District ID: 3602880
- District ID: 580303020000

Students and staff
- Students: 130 (2021–22)
- Teachers: 13 (FTE)
- Student–teacher ratio: 10

Other information
- Website: aufsd.org

Amagansett Union Free School District is a public school district located in Amagansett on Long Island, in Suffolk County, New York, United States. It educates students residing in the hamlets of Amagansett and Napeague, both part of the town of East Hampton.

The district operates one school, the Amagansett School, serving grades PK through 6. The total enrollment for the 2020–2021 school year was 136 students. Students then complete their education at the East Hampton Middle School and East Hampton High School as part of a tuition agreement with the East Hampton Union Free School District.

Maria Door is the school's principal and Michael Rodgers is the district's superintendent. Rodgers predecessor, Seth Turner, was in the role from 2018 to 2022. Rodgers was previously the schools Physical Education Teacher.

Amagansett is bordered by the Montauk school district to the east, the Springs district to the north, and East Hampton district to the west.

== History ==
The original schoolhouse, built by Samuel Schellinger in 1802, was located on Amagansett Street (now Main Street/Montauk Highway) in the center of town. The district itself was founded in 1813.

In 1864, the schoolhouse was moved to Atlantic Avenue and Main Street near the Amagansett Cemetery in 1864. This was replaced by a building at the nearby intersection of Atlantic Avenue and Abrahams Landing Road in 1881. The older building was auctioned off, but was later donated back to the district in 2014.

The current brick schoolhouse is a Georgian-style building that opened in 1936 with the aid of a $75,000 Works Progress Administration grant.

In February 1989, voters approved the district's proposal to purchase a two-bedroom house adjacent to the school grounds that would serve as a home for the superintendent.

Amagansett's 2020–2021 budget proposal in February 2020 forecasted an increase of 15 students in the school due to the opening of a new affordable housing complex in the district. In reality, partially as a result of the COVID-19 pandemic, enrollment nearly doubled to 136 students, a number not seen since the 1970s.
