= Bridgehampton Union Free School District =

School district in the U.S. state of New York

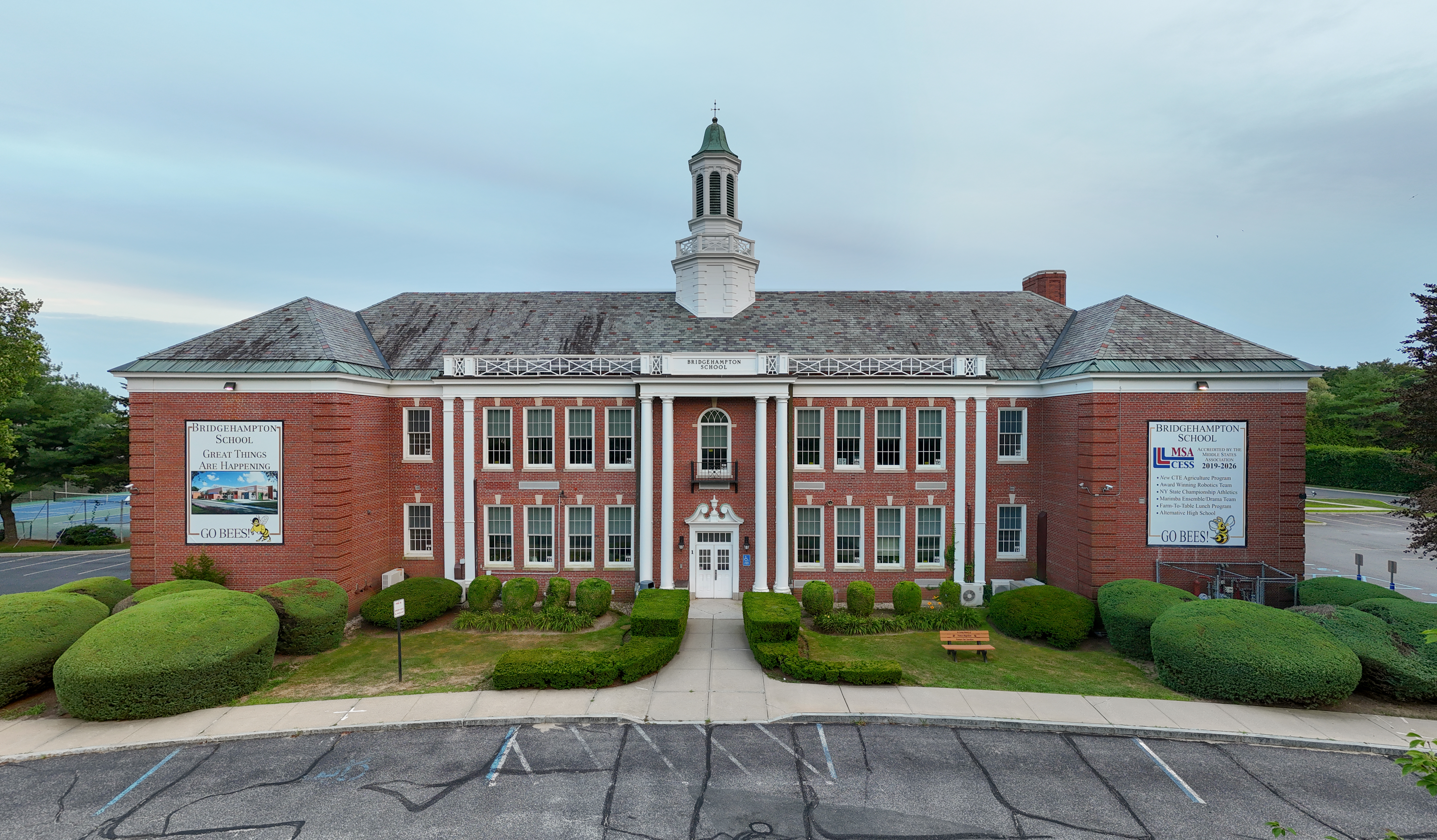

Address
- 2685 Montauk Highway Bridgehampton, Suffolk County, New York; United States

District information
- Type: Public
- Grades: PK-12
- Established: 1907
- President: Jo Ann Comfort
- Vice-president: Angela Chmielewski
- Superintendent: Dr. Mary T. Kelly
- Business administrator: Dr. Peter Daly
- Governing agency: New York State Education Department
- Schools: 1
- Budget: $20,658,612 (2021-22)
- NCES District ID: 3605370
- District ID: 580909020000

Students and staff
- Students: 223 (2019-20)
- Teachers: 46.95 FTE (2019-20)
- Staff: 37.44 FTE (2019-20)
- Student–teacher ratio: 4.75 (2019-20)

Other information
- Website: bridgehampton.k12.ny.us

Bridgehampton School

Information
- Type: Public
- Established: 1720
- NCES School ID: 360537000271
- Principal: Michael Cox
- Colors: Yellow and Black
- Mascot: Killer Bees; Bonackers (Football)
- Communities served: Bridgehampton, Noyack (part), Sag Harbor (part), Sagaponack (part)

Bridgehampton Union Free School District is a public school district located in the Town of Southampton on Long Island, in Suffolk County, New York, United States. It is roughly co-extensive with the hamlet of Bridgehampton, but also serves parts of Noyack, unincorporated Sag Harbor, and unincorporated Sagaponack.

The district operates one school, the Bridgehampton School serving grades Pre-K through 12. The total enrollment for the 2019–2020 school year was 223 students. Its high school, which also serves students from the Sagaponack Common School District, is one of the 30 smallest in the state of New York. Proposals to close the high school and send students to larger nearby high schools have failed.

The district's superintendent, Dr. Mary T. Kelly, began her tenure in July 2021.

Bridgehampton is bordered by the Southampton school district to the west, the Sag Harbor district to the north, and the Sagaponack district to the east.

In 2010, Bridgehampton was the richest school district in New York State.

== History ==
=== Early years ===
Bridgehampton's first public school was the Two Chimney Schoolhouse, opened in 1720. The building was located at Bull's Head – later known as Triangle Common – the intersection of what is now Montauk Highway and the Bridgehampton-Sag Harbor Turnpike (about 0.5 miles (0.80 km) from the current school building). In 1820, Southampton Town school commissioners Abraham Rose, Rufus Foster, and William Herrick laid out school districts for the town; Bridgehampton became District #9, and moved two a new building on the same site. This building was used until c. 1842. The next schoolhouse was sold in an August 1907 action to Herbert Hedges, who moved the building to Wainscott, where it now stands as a chapel and community center.

In 1907, the newly-formed Bridgehampton Union School District voted to build a new school on a new site off Church Lane. The new two-story building opened as a middle school on January 6, 1908, adding a high school program two years later. In 1911, the district became the Bridgehampton Union Free School District and graduated its first student. This school was later known as the "School Street School" due to its location at the corner of Church Lane and School Street, the current site of the Bridgehampton Fire Department.

Outgrowing this facility, construction broke ground on the current Montauk Highway building, the area's fifth school building, in September 1930. The building was designed by the architectural firm Tooker and Marsh and opened in 1931.

=== Recent history ===
For a period that lasted through most of the 1990s, the school had a primarily African-American enrollment, but a 2004 New York Times article detailed large demographic changes in the community and the school.

Due to its small size, some have proposed that the high school portion of the school should be closed and students sent to larger nearby high schools in adjacent districts. A ballot to close the high school during the 1987-88 school year narrowly succeeded, but was later overturned. A 2009 initiative was also defeated.

In 2003, the district signed a contract with the nearby private Ross School to provide breakfast and lunch at a cost of $3.12 per student. The district does not have its own kitchen. It was the first public school-private school partnership for school lunch in New York State.

A $29.4 million extensive renovation and expansion of the school was approved by voters in December 2016. The expansion was to add over 35,000 square feet (3,300 m^{2}) to the existing 30,000-square-foot (2,800 m^{2}) building and was originally expected to be completed by December 2020. The project included a new gym and athletic facilities, new cafeteria, new technology room, renovated library, and renovated classrooms. Construction was delayed due to the COVID-19 pandemic, but some renovated classrooms were available for use in the second half of the 2020–2021 school year. The project was fully completed in time for the 2021–2022 school year.

Dr. Mary T. Kelly, the current superintendent, was appointed in May 2021. She was nominated to succeed Robert Hauser, who had previously been superintendent since February 2018 and assistant superintendent before that.

In April 2023, the district announced that Assistant Principal Michael Cox would become principal effective July 1, 2023. This followed the announcement that current principal Michael Miller would be moving to the Superintendent/Principal role at East Quogue Union Free School District.

== Athletics ==
The sports teams are known as the "Killer Bees," and the basketball team has won nine small-school (Class D) state championships as of 2016, including in 1978, 1979, 1980, 1984, 1986, 1996, 1997, 1998, 2015.

Bridgehampton students play football at East Hampton High School in a consortium that also includes Pierson Middle-High School in Sag Harbor, New York. The school also sends athletes from some other sports to play at Pierson. In 2018 and 2019, the Bridgehampton/Sag Harbor consortium instead played at Southampton High School due to low enrollment in East Hampton.

During the 1990s basketball victory run, the mascot for the team changed from the "Bridgies." The away jerseys for the team still has the name "Bridgies" on it although the home jerseys have the "Bees" on them.

The school's original basketball court, which opened in 1931, was dubbed the Bee Hive or Matchbox. It was smaller than regulation size, 13 feet (4.0 m) shorter sideline to sideline and 19 feet (5.8 m) shorter from baseline to baseline. The last game played in The Hive was February 2, 2020, vs. Shelter Island. A new regulation-size gym opened for the 2020–2021 school year as part of a $29 million expansion to the school.

Carl Yastrzemski broke the local high basketball scoring record before graduating in 1957 (628). He attended University of Notre Dame on a basketball scholarship after graduating the school. He also hit .512 while playing high school baseball and led the team to two straight Suffolk County championships.

Shaquille O'Neal produced a documentary history of the basketball team in connection with the 2015-2016 season titled Killer Bees which was the project of Orson and Ben Cummings. Included in the movie was Joe Zucker, an artist who is a volunteer assistant coach for the team.

== Notable alumni ==
- Carl Yastrzemski, professional baseball player
- William S. Stavropoulos, pharmaceutical executive
