= Sydney Butchkes =

American artist, designer (1922–2015)

- Born: October 13, 1920; Covington, Kentucky, U.S.
- Died: August 10, 2015 (aged 94); Sagaponack, Long Island, New York, U.S.
- Occupations: Painter, sculptor, art director, illustrator, graphic designer

Sydney Butchkes (October 13, 1920 – August 10, 2015) was an American visual artist and designer. He worked as a painter, sculptor, art director, illustrator, and graphic designer. Butchkes was elected as an American Craft Council (ACC) honorary fellow in 1985.

== Biography ==
Sydney Butchkes was born on October 13, 1920, in Covington, Kentucky, and raised in Cincinnati, Ohio. However some sources state he was born in 1922. He studied at the Cincinnati Art Academy (now the Art Academy of Cincinnati), the Art Students League of New York, and The New School in New York City. During World War II, he served in the United States Army.

In the early 1960s, he moved to Sagaponack in Long Island. Butchkes died at home on August 10, 2015, in Sagaponack.

His artwork is in museum collections, including the Smithsonian American Art Museum, Brooklyn Museum, Metropolitan Museum of Art, Sheldon Museum of Art, and The Newark Museum of Art.

== Exhibitions ==
- 1949: "The 28th Annual Exhibition of Advertising and Editorial Art of the New York Art Directors Club", group exhibition, Museum of Modern Art, New York City, New York
- 1978: "200 Years of Fabrics: Personal Collection of Jack Lenor Larsen", group exhibition, Elaine Benson Gallery, Bridgehampton, New York
- 1978: "Sydney Butchkes, Abstract paintlogs", solo exhibition, Alonzo, New York City, New York
- 1981: "Days Of Wine And Nudes", group exhibition, Peter S. Loonam Gallery, Bridgehampton, New York
- 1984: "Some Major Artists of the Hamptons: Then and Now", group exhibition, Elaine Benson Gallery, Bridgehampton, New York
- 2006: "Out of the Earth", group exhibition, Celadon Gallery, Water Mill, New York
