= Axel Stawski =

- Born: 1950 or 1951 (age 75–76); West Germany
- Education: University of Birmingham; New York University
- Occupations: Real estate developer and investor
- Spouse: Galia Meiri Stawski

Axel Stawski (born 1950/51) is an American billionaire real estate developer and investor, known for his ownership of properties in Manhattan through his firm, Stawski Partners.

== Early life ==
His parents, Moniek and Zosia, were Jewish survivors of the Holocaust. Moniek, who died in 2013, was a real estate developer in West Germany, primarily building shopping centres, before emigrating with his family to the US in 1971. Axel, the second of the couple’s five children, has a brother, physician Mike Stawski; and three sisters: Ester A. Stawski, Irene Fogel, and Naomi Atholz.

He has a bachelor's degree from the University of Birmingham in England, and a PhD in international law from New York University School of Law.

== Career ==
In 1973, he founded Stawski Partners, which as of 2016 owns six office buildings and three condos, all in Manhattan, including the 30-storey 565 Fifth Avenue.

Stawski is known for developing office buildings that emphasize design and detail, often choosing corner lots and rebuilding from the ground up.

== Personal life ==
Stawski is married to Galia Meiri Stawski; they live in Sagaponack, New York.

He is a board member of the American Society for Yad Vashem.
