= Springs, New York =

- Hamlet and census-designated place
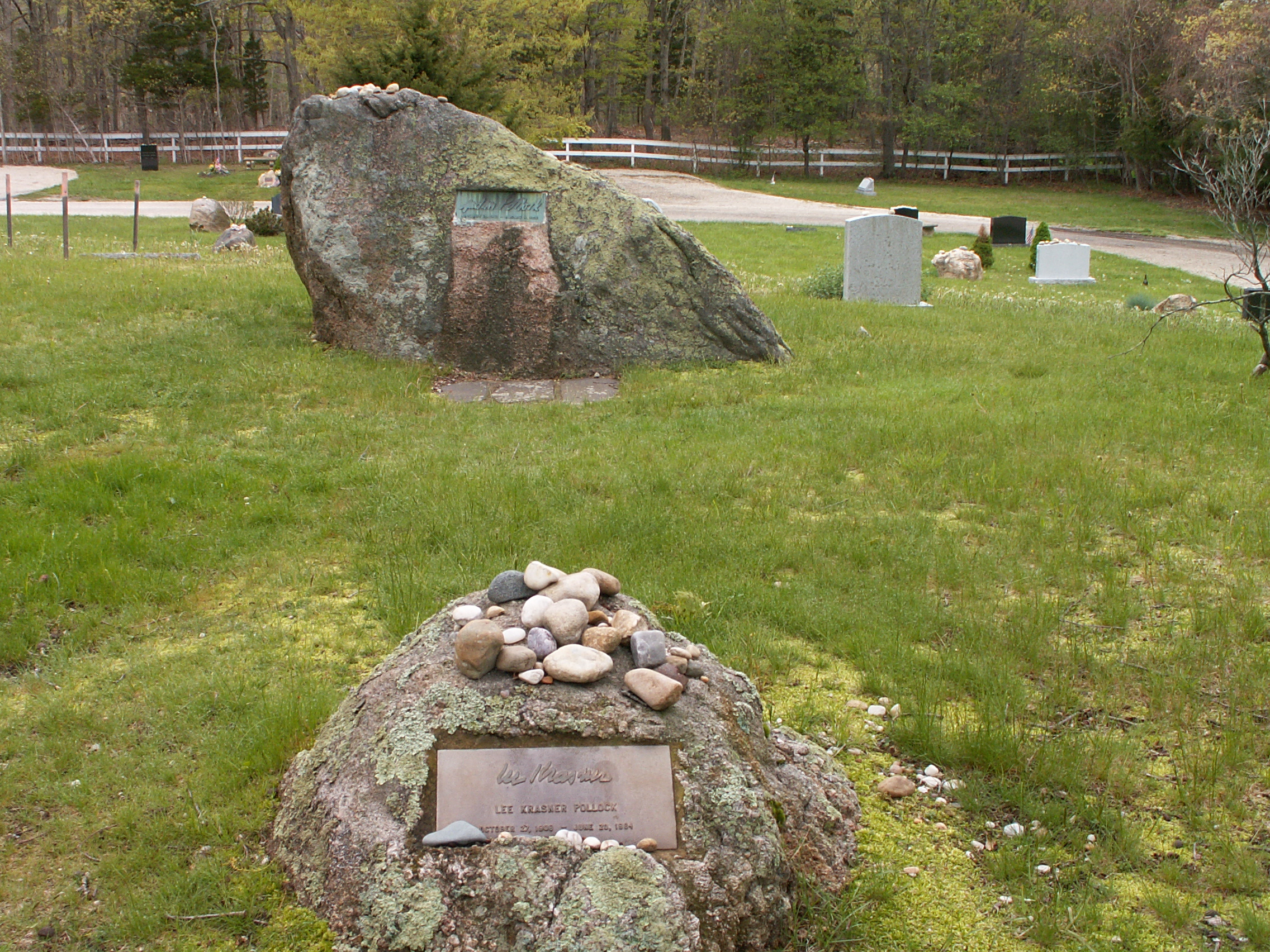
- Memorial boulders for artists Lee Krasner (foreground) and her husband Jackson Pollock (background) in Green River Cemetery

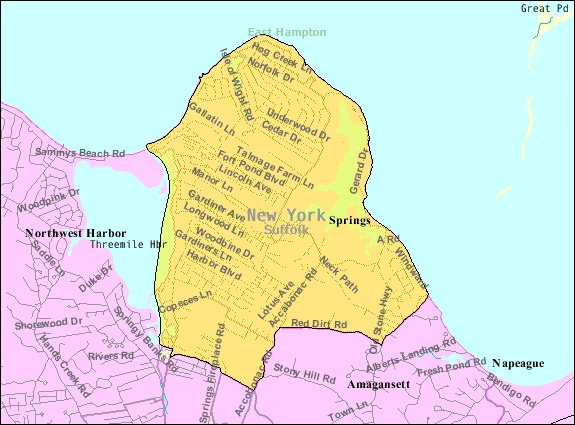

- Location within Long Island Location within New York Location within the United States
- Coordinates: 41°1′31″N 72°9′31″W
- Country: United States
- State: New York
- County: Suffolk
- Town: East Hampton

Area
  - Total: 12.17 sq mi (31.52 km^{2})
  - Land: 8.48 sq mi (21.96 km^{2})
  - Water: 3.69 sq mi (9.57 km^{2})
- Elevation: 9.8 ft (3 m)

Population (2020)
  - Total: 8,086
  - Density: 953.7/sq mi (368.24/km^{2})
- Time zone: UTC−5 (Eastern (EST))
  - Summer (DST): UTC−4 (EDT)
- ZIP code: 11937
- Area codes: 631 and 934
- FIPS code: 36-70387
- GNIS feature ID: 0966103

Springs is a census-designated place (CDP) roughly corresponding to the hamlet by the same name in the Town of East Hampton in Suffolk County, New York, United States, on the South Fork of Long Island. As of the 2020 census, Springs had a population of 8,086.

== History ==
Springs is known in art circles as the cradle of the abstract expressionist movement. Artists such as Jackson Pollock, Willem de Kooning and John Ferren worked there. Writers such as Kurt Vonnegut, Joseph Heller, Philip Roth, Nora Ephron, and John Steinbeck have lived in or near Springs. Artists and writers were attracted to the area due to its rural nature, despite being within 100 miles (160 km) of New York City, and because housing prices "north of the Montauk Highway" on the bay side of the East Hampton peninsula have traditionally been lower than those closer to the Atlantic Ocean. Traditionally, locals are referred to as "Bonackers" which comes from Accabonac Harbor in Springs. East Hampton High School has adopted the Bonacker name for its sports teams.

The main roads connecting Springs to East Hampton are Springs-Fireplace Road and Three Mile Harbor Road. Jackson Pollock died in a car crash on Springs-Fireplace Road in 1956. Pollock and his wife Lee Krasner are buried in Green River Cemetery. Pollock's grave is marked by a large glacial erratic stone on top of a hill, Krasner's by a small stone lower on the hill. Since Pollock's burial, numerous other writers and artists have been buried in the cemetery, joining the locals.

The Pollock-Krasner House and Studio on Springs-Fireplace Road is owned by Stony Brook University and is open for tours by appointment. It includes an external studio shed where dried paint from Pollock's projects is splattered on the floor and evokes Pollock's most famous works. The neighborhood around it is an East Hampton historic district. Springs-Fireplace Road gets its name from fireplaces at its terminus that was used to signal the residents of Gardiners Island that supplies were ready to be picked up.

== Geography ==
According to the United States Census Bureau, the hamlet has a total area of 9.2 square miles (24 km^{2}), of which 8.5 square miles (22 km^{2}) is land and 0.8 square miles (2.1 km^{2}), or 8.19%, is water.

== Demographics ==
As of the census of 2010, there were 6,592 people, 2,318 households, and 1,500 families residing in the CDP. The population density was 775.5 inhabitants per square mile (299.4/km^{2}). There were 4,340 housing units at an average density of 510.6 per square mile (197.1/km^{2}). The racial makeup of the CDP was 83.3% White, 1.7% African American, 0.7% Native American, 1.5% Asian, 0.02% Pacific Islander, 11.3% some other race, and 1.5% from two or more races. Hispanic or Latino of any race were 36.6% of the population.

There were 2,318 households, out of which 34.4% had children under the age of 18 living with them, 49.4% were headed by married couples living together, 9.6% had a female householder with no husband present, and 35.3% were non-families. 25.7% of all households were made up of individuals, and 10.6% were someone living alone who was 65 years of age or older. The average household size was 2.84, and the average family size was 3.27.

In the CDP, the population was spread out, with 21.8% under the age of 18, 8.0% from 18 to 24, 29.8% from 25 to 44, 28.1% from 45 to 64, and 12.3% who were 65 years of age or older. The median age was 38.5 years. For every 100 females, there were 108.5 males. For every 100 females age 18 and over, there were 110.7 males.

For the period 2007–2011, the median annual income for a household in the CDP was $70,546, and the median income for a family was $85,582. Males had a median income of $37,000 versus $35,607 for females. The per capita income for the CDP was $33,937. About 4.7% of families and 10.3% of the population were below the poverty line, including 14.7% of those under age 18 and 3.5% of those age 65 or over.

Historical population
Census	Pop.	Note	%±
2020	8,086		—
U.S. Decennial Census

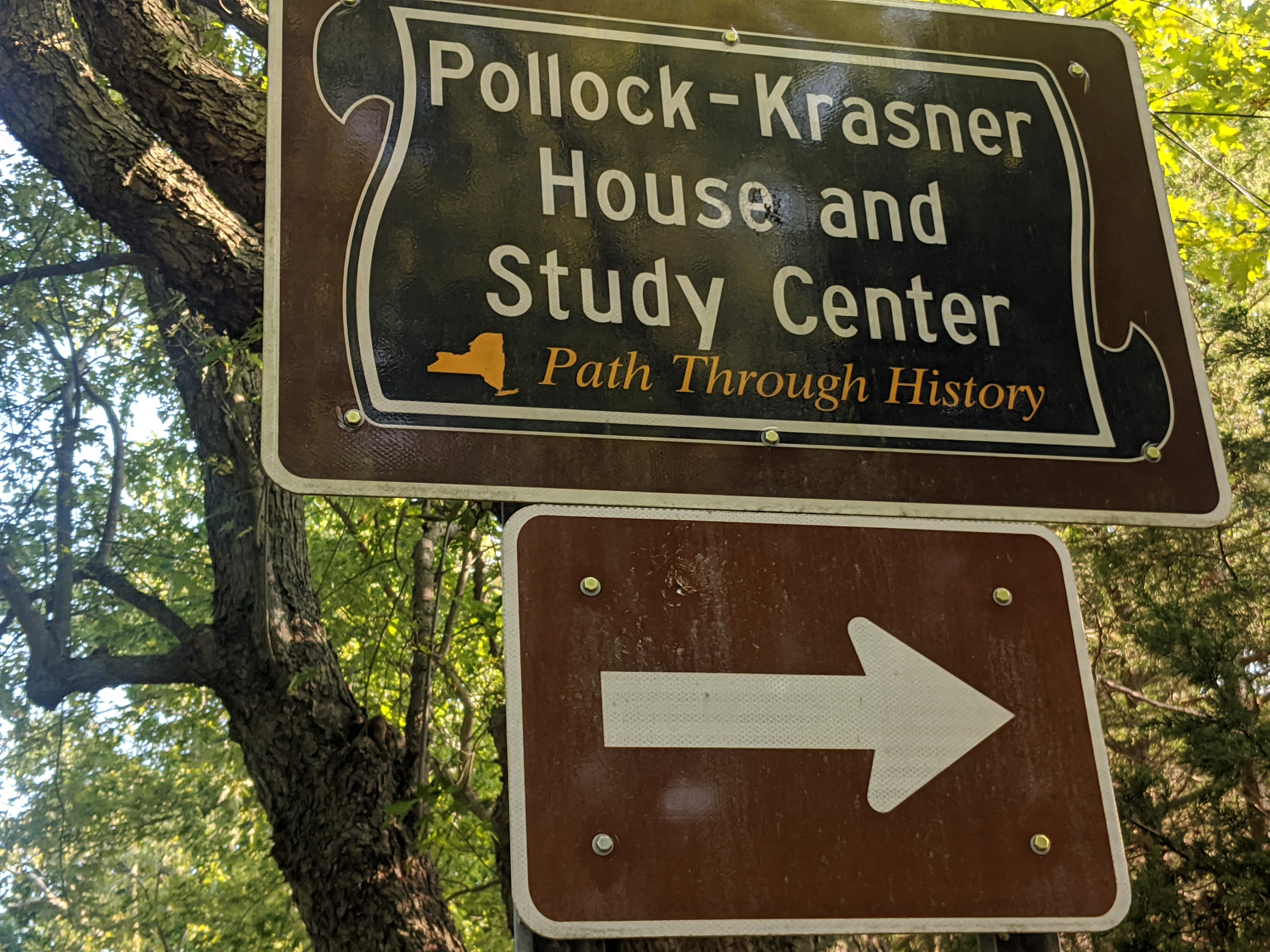
Pollock - Krasner house and study center sign

== Education ==
The Springs Union Free School District operates the Springs School, which educates students from pre-kindergarten through grade 8. High school students attend East Hampton High School.

== Gallery ==
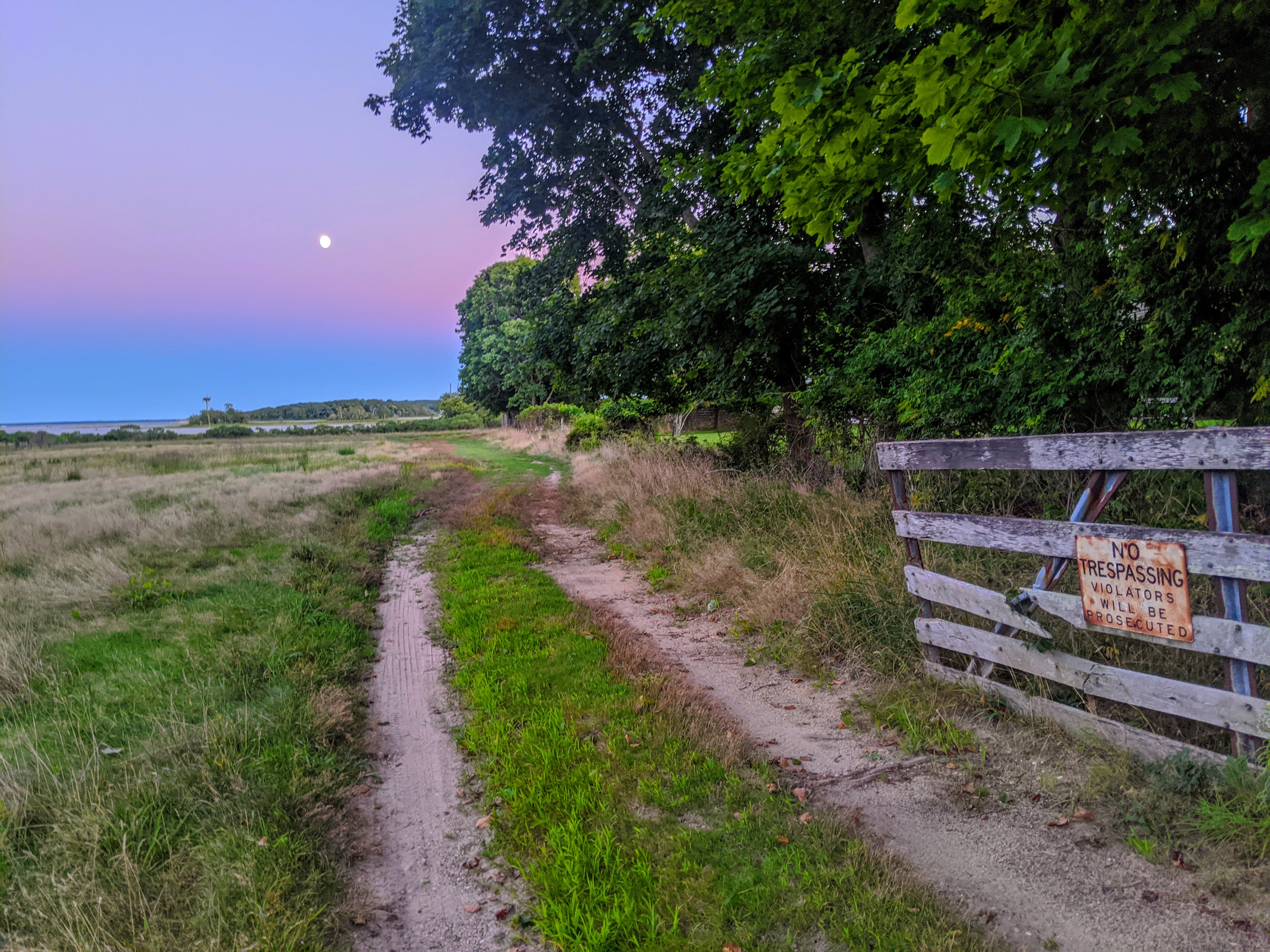
'Marders pollinaters sanctuary Bee pollinators sanctuary Springs, Long Island,

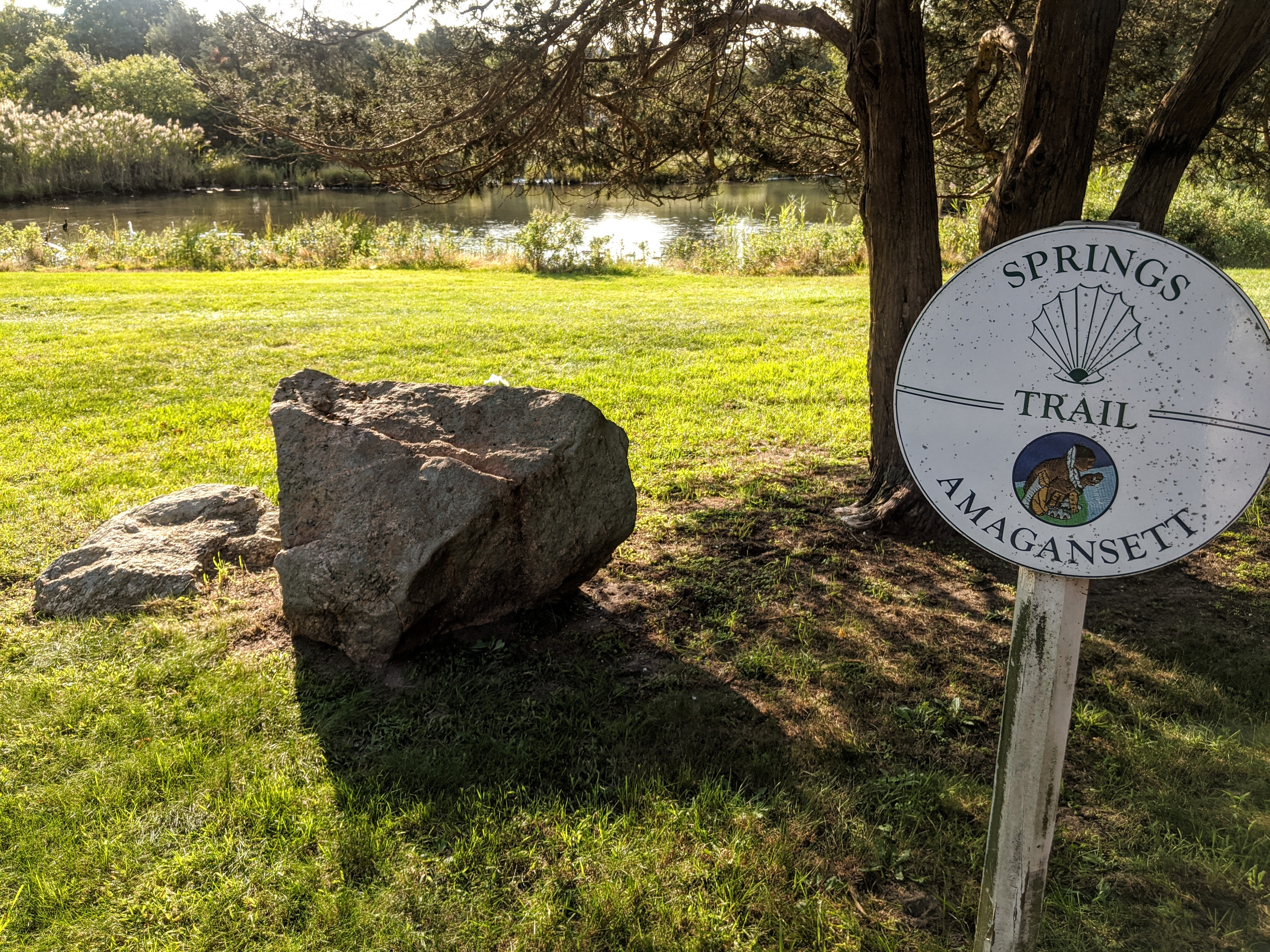
Springs trail marker

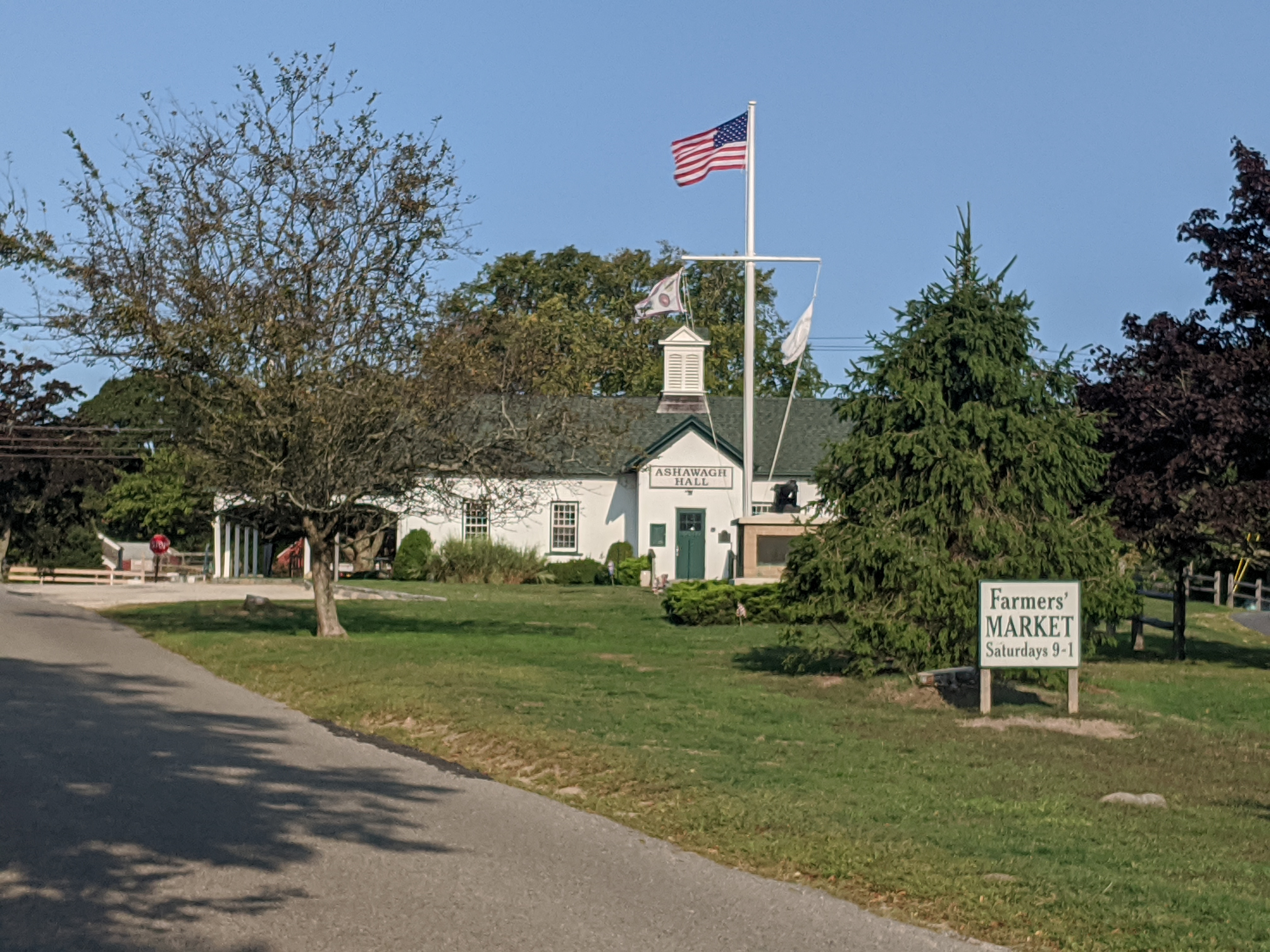
"Little Red Schoolhouse" built in 1847. Ashawagh hall, Springs, Long Island, c. 1847.

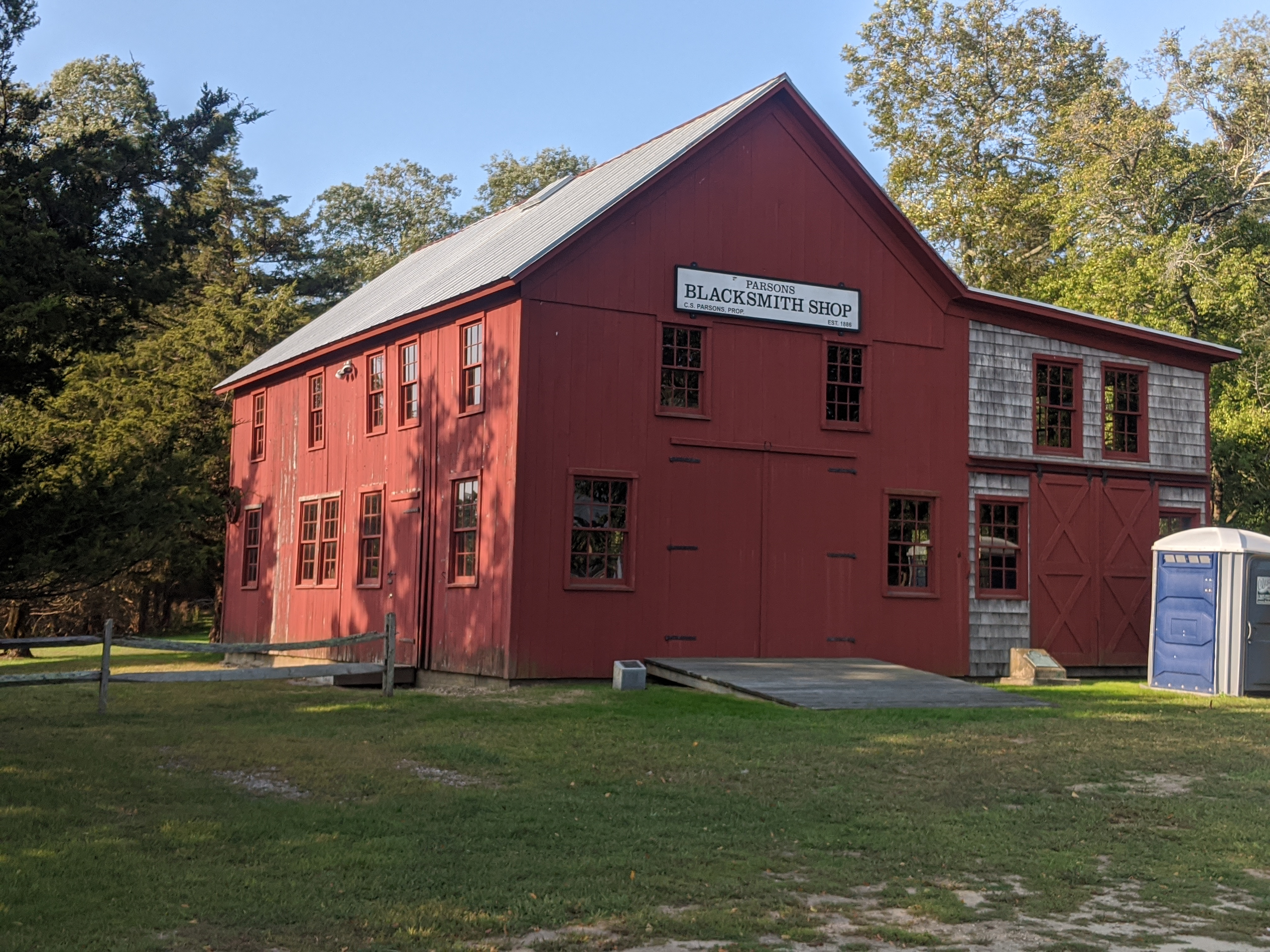
Charles S. Parsons Blacksmith Shop. Blacksmith Shop, Springs, Long Island, c. 1886-1925.

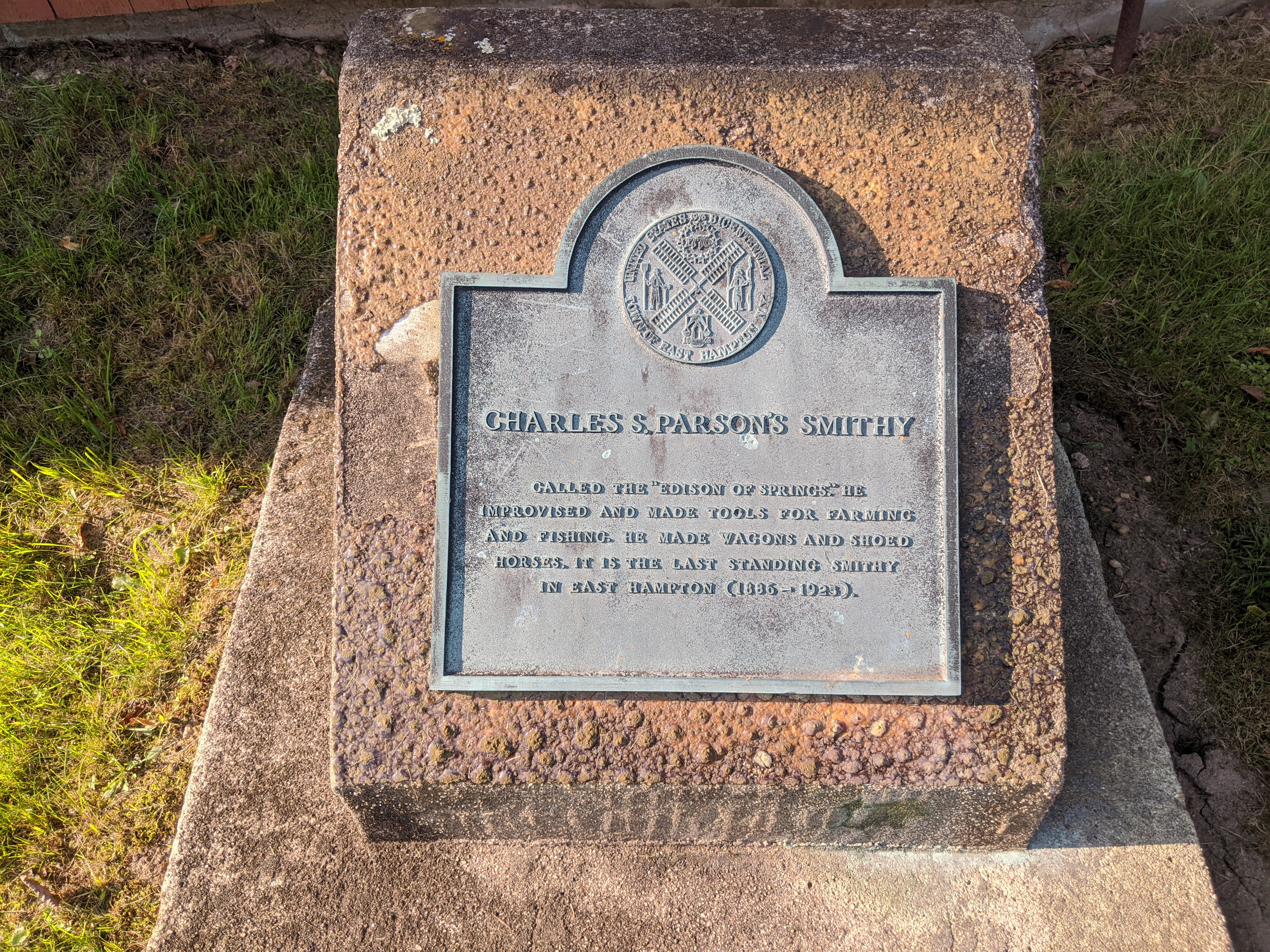
Charles S. Parsons Smithy - Springs Blacksmith Shop historical marker Blacksmith Shop, Springs, Long Island, c. 1886-1925.

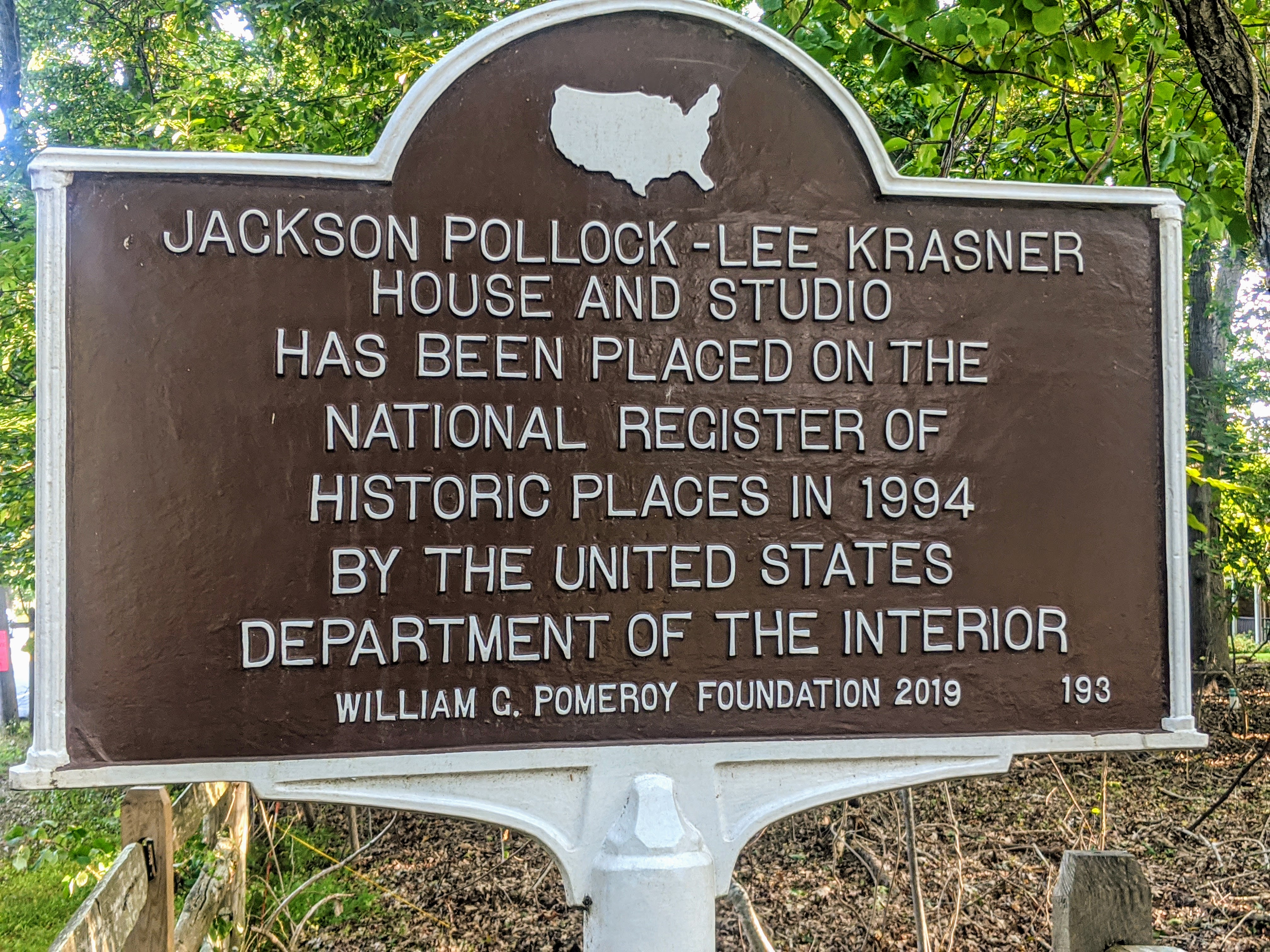
Pollock-Krasner House and Study Center. Springs, Long Island,

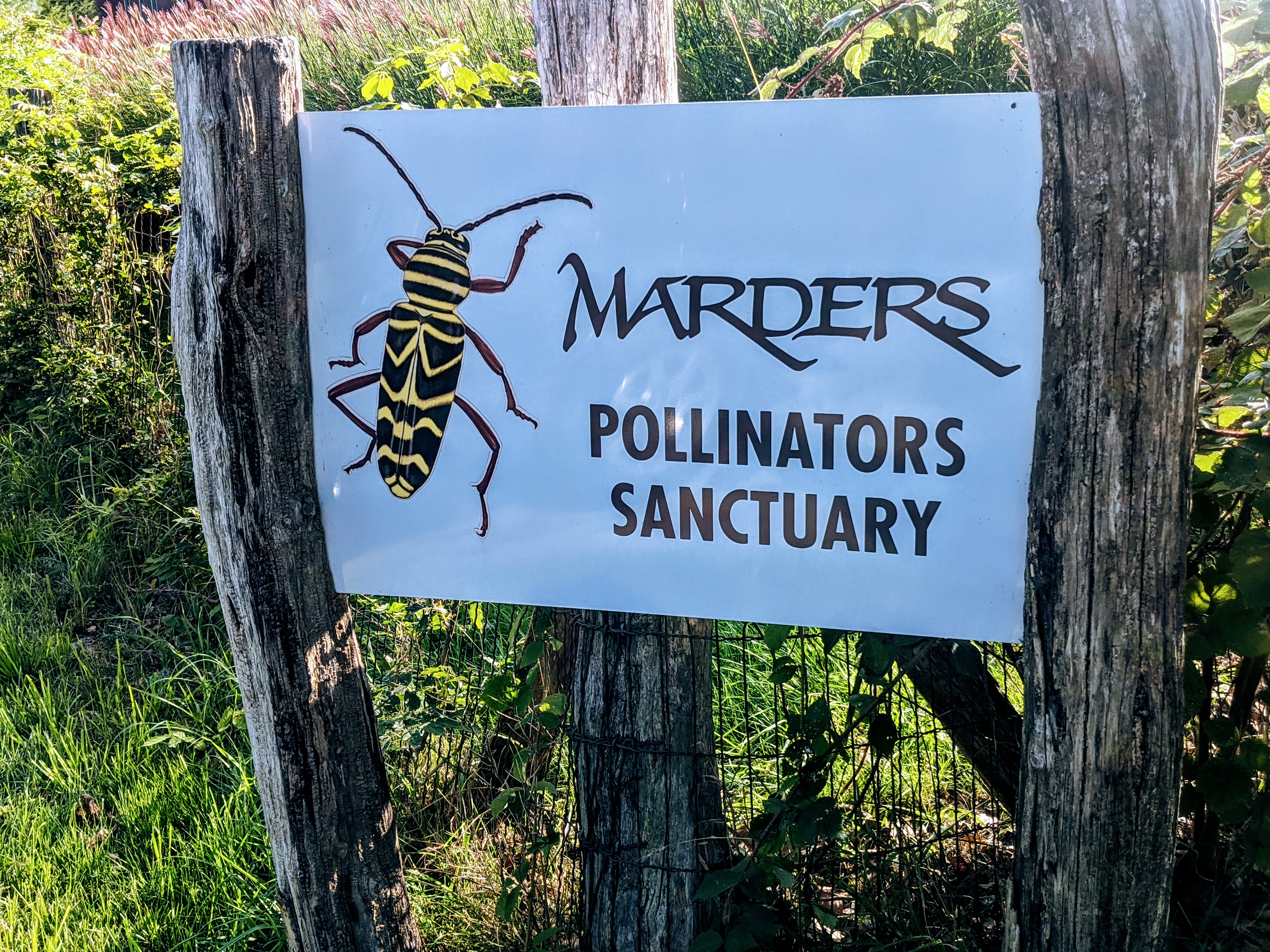
Marders pollinators sanctuary sign, Springs, Long Island,

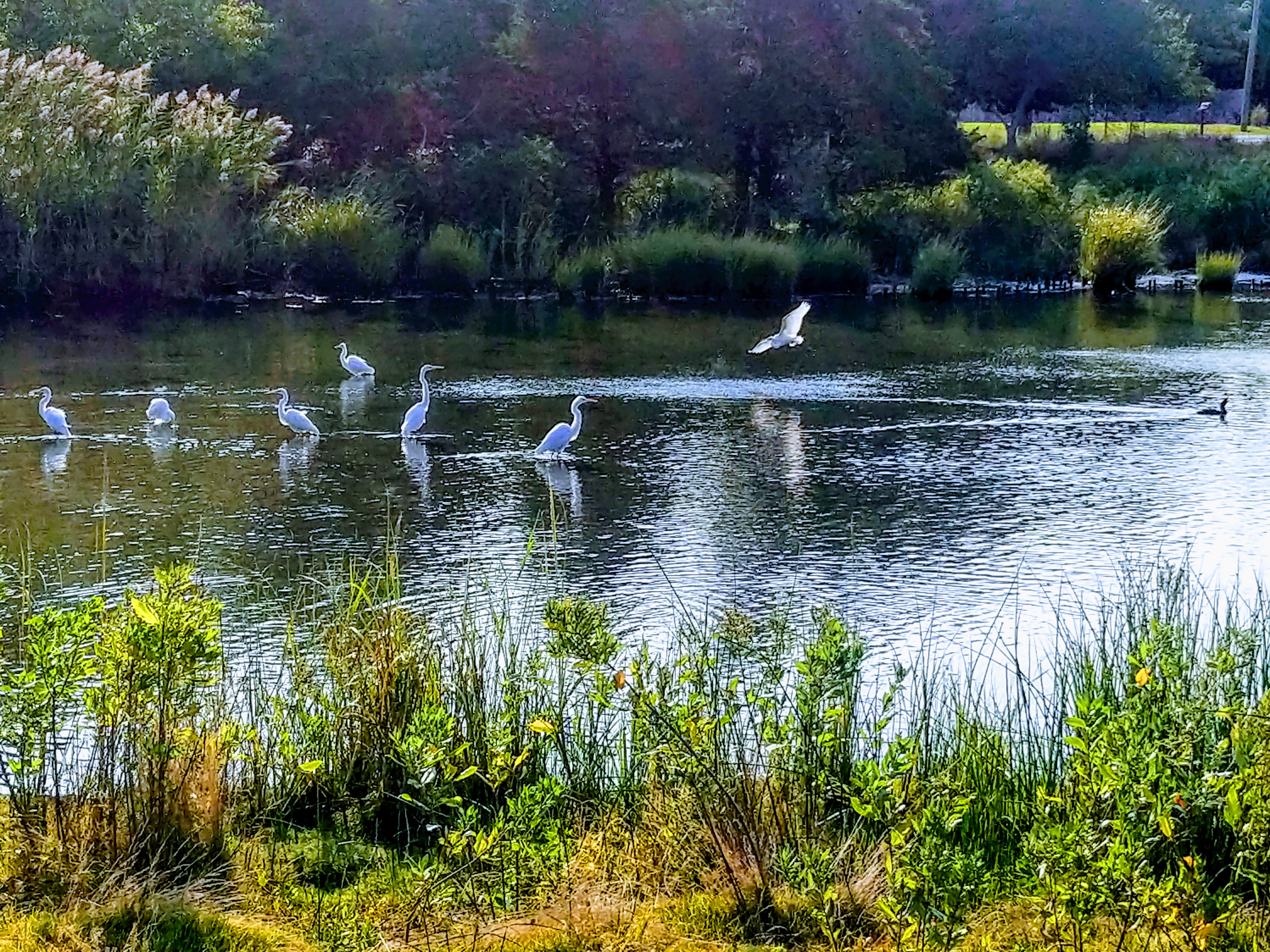
Pussy's Pond Park Town Pond at Amagansett trail Springs, Long Island,

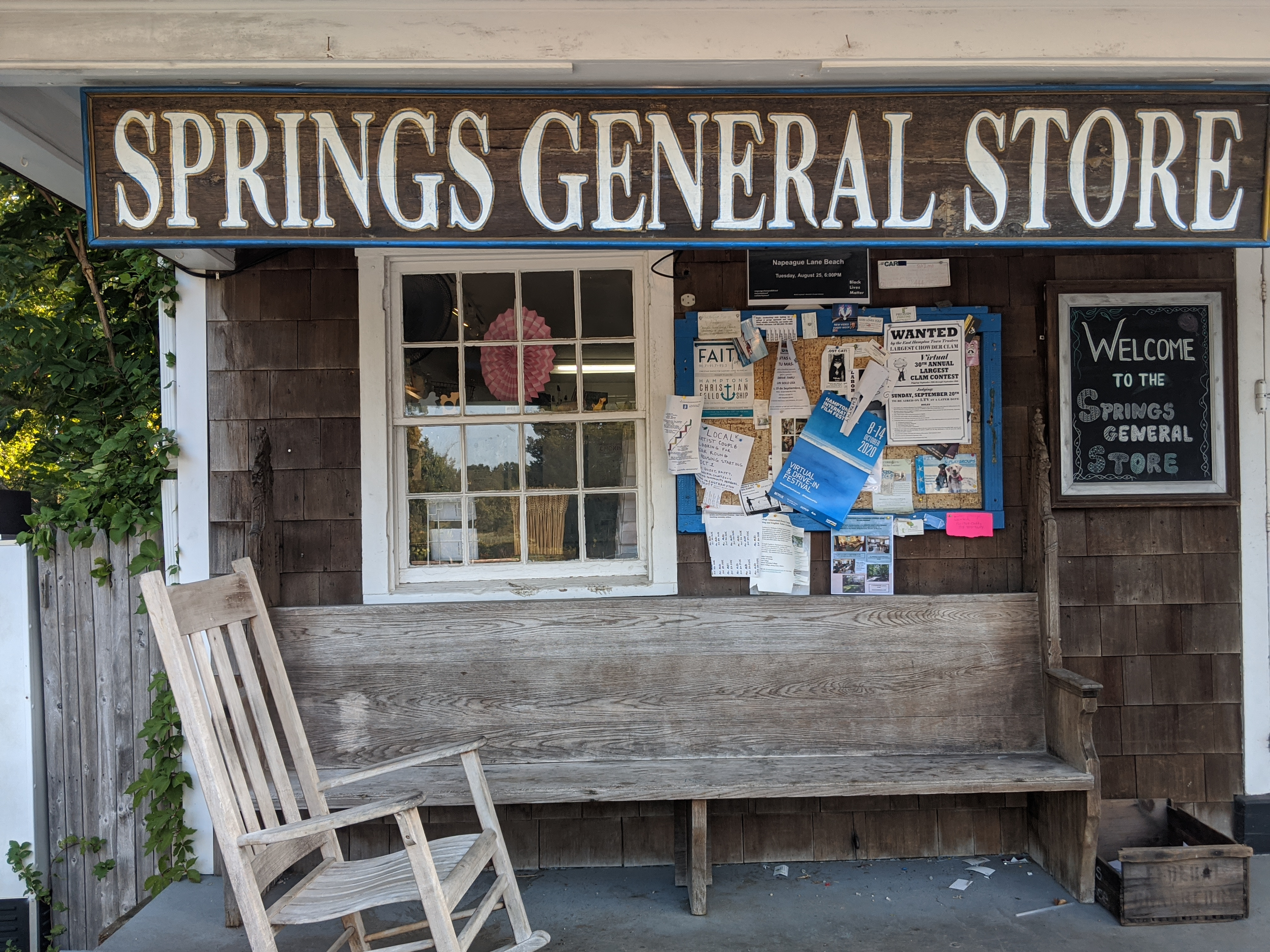
Springs General Store rocking chair Springs, Long Island,

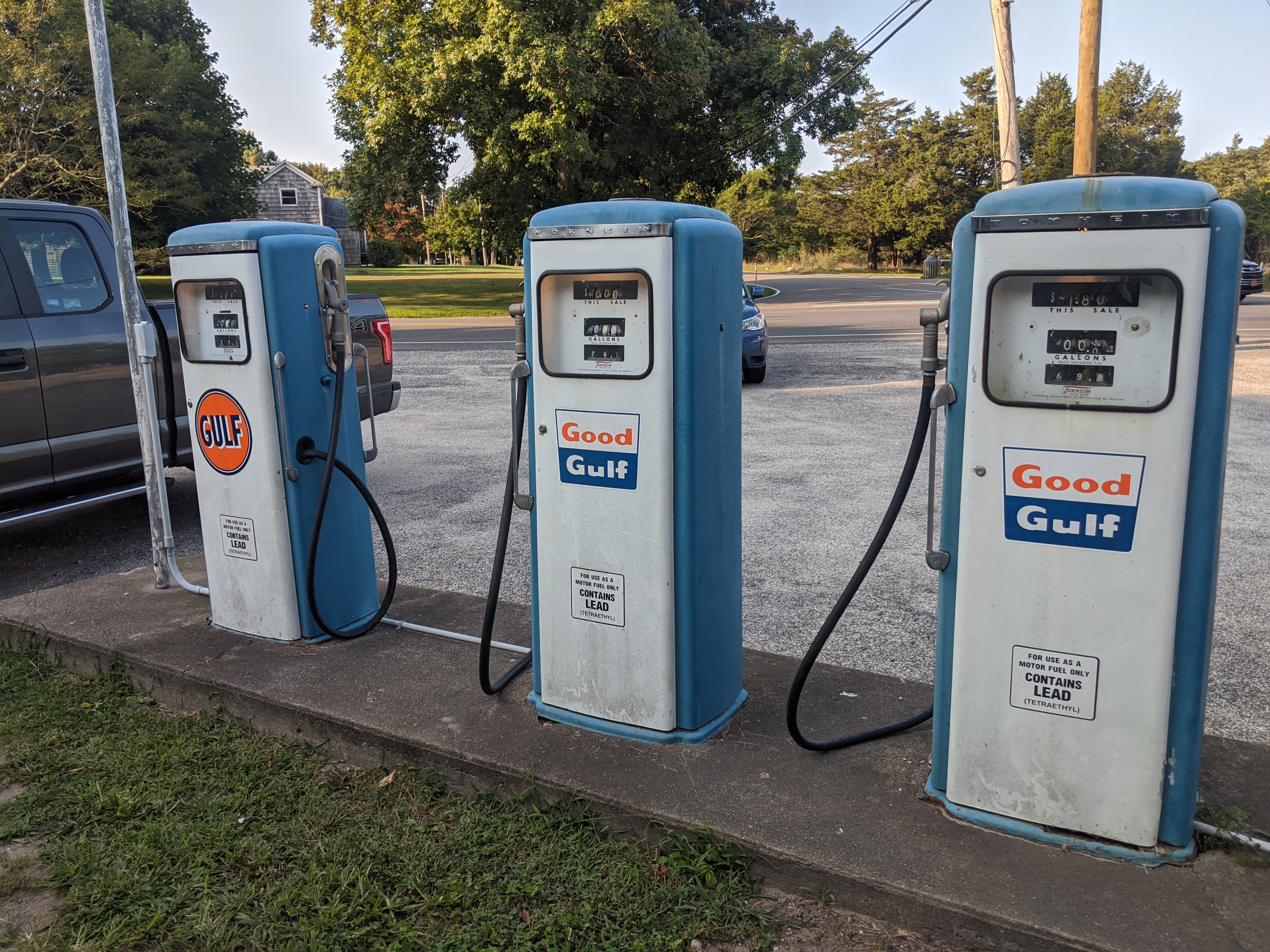
Springs General Store vintage gas pumps, Springs, Long Island,

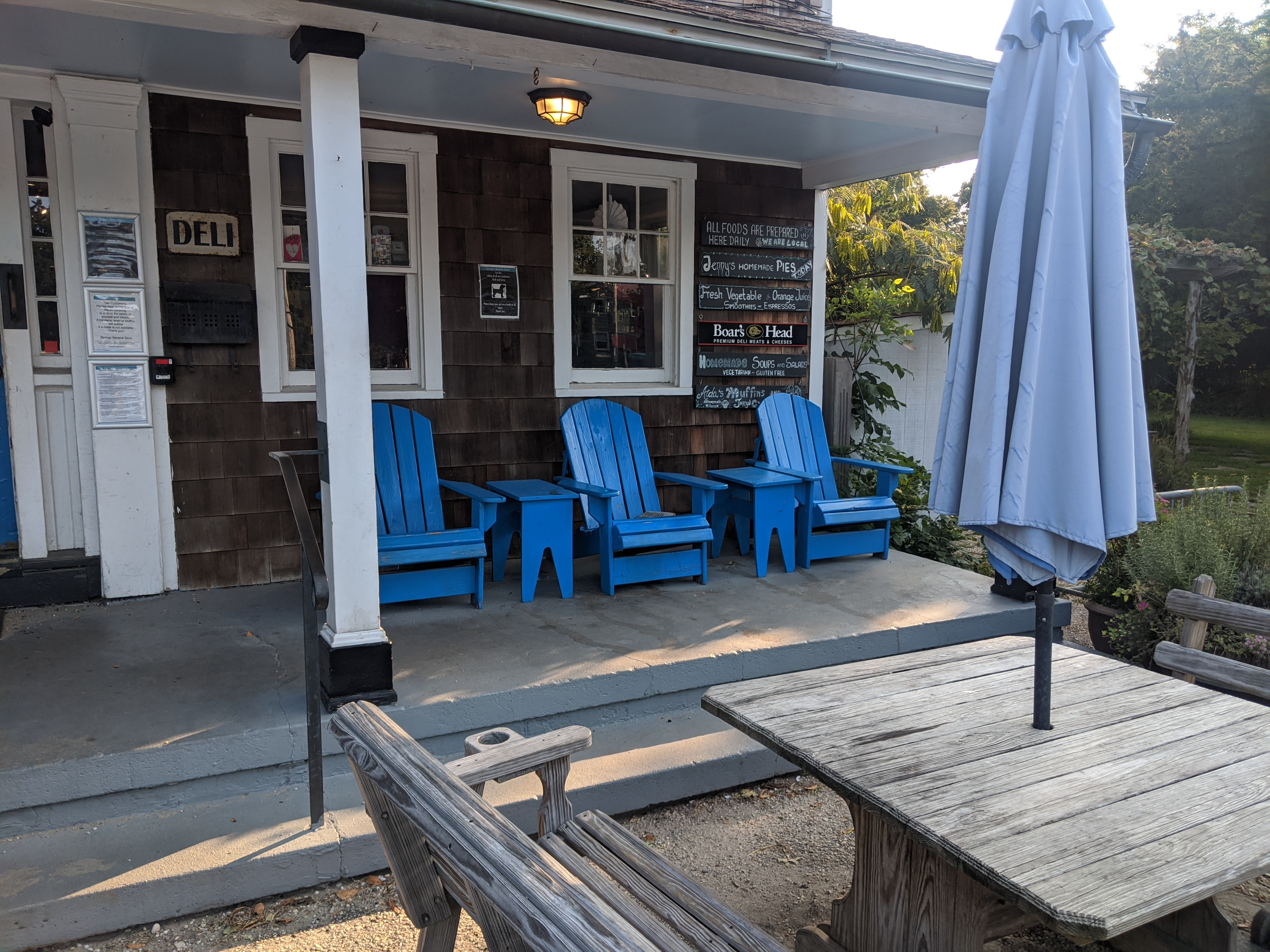
Springs General Store front porch, Springs, Long Island,

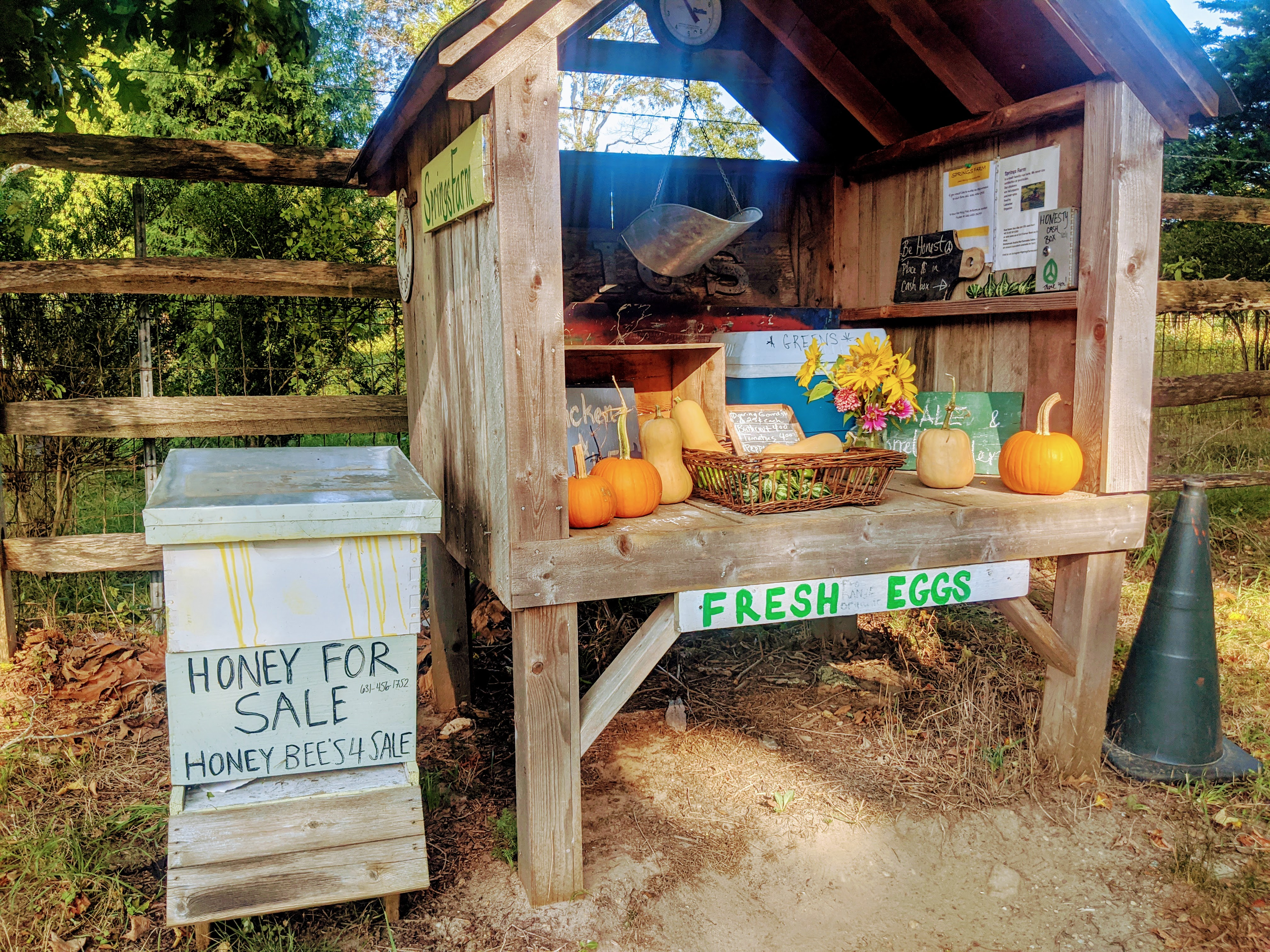
Farmstand in Springs

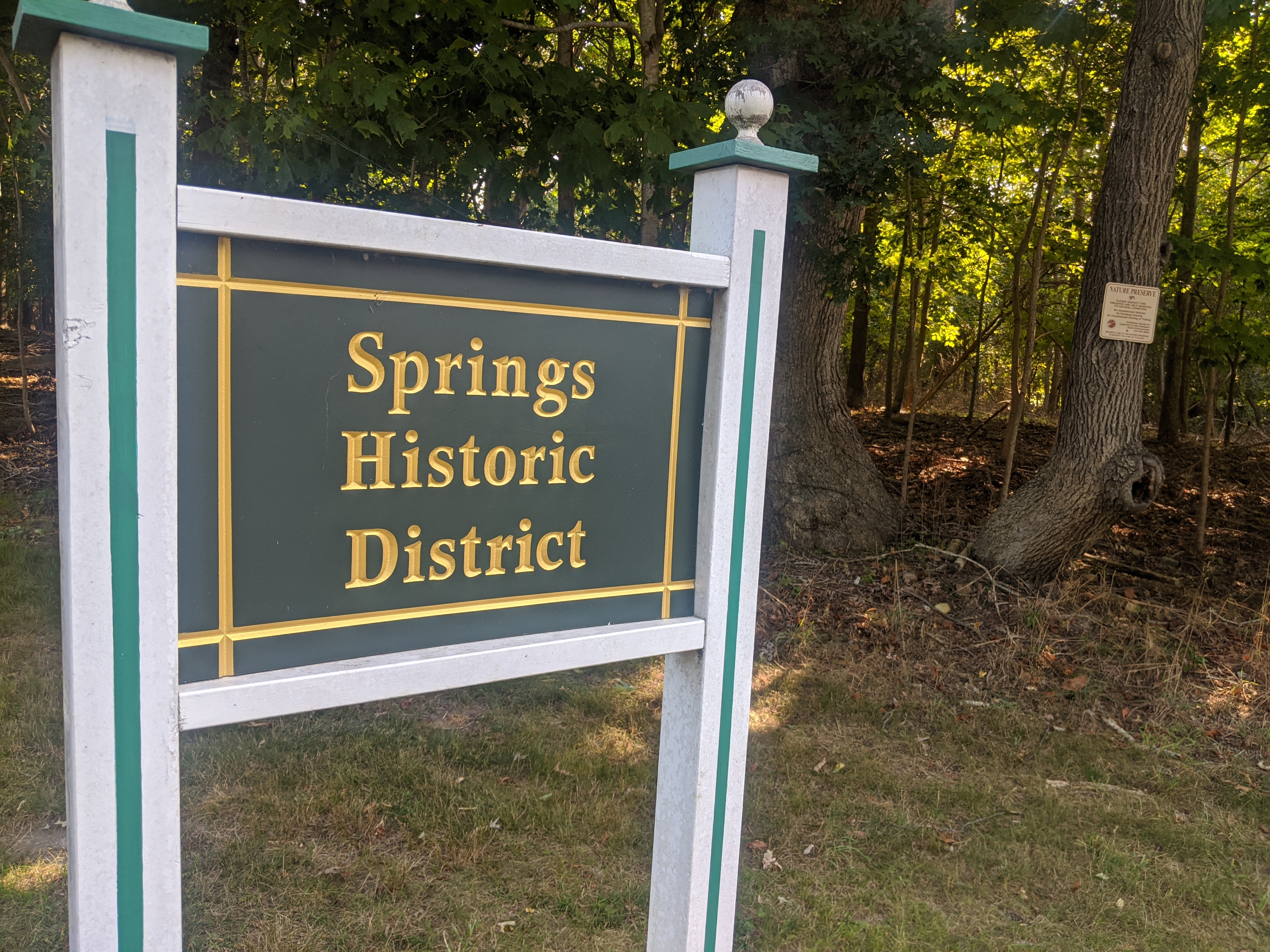
Springs Historic District sign

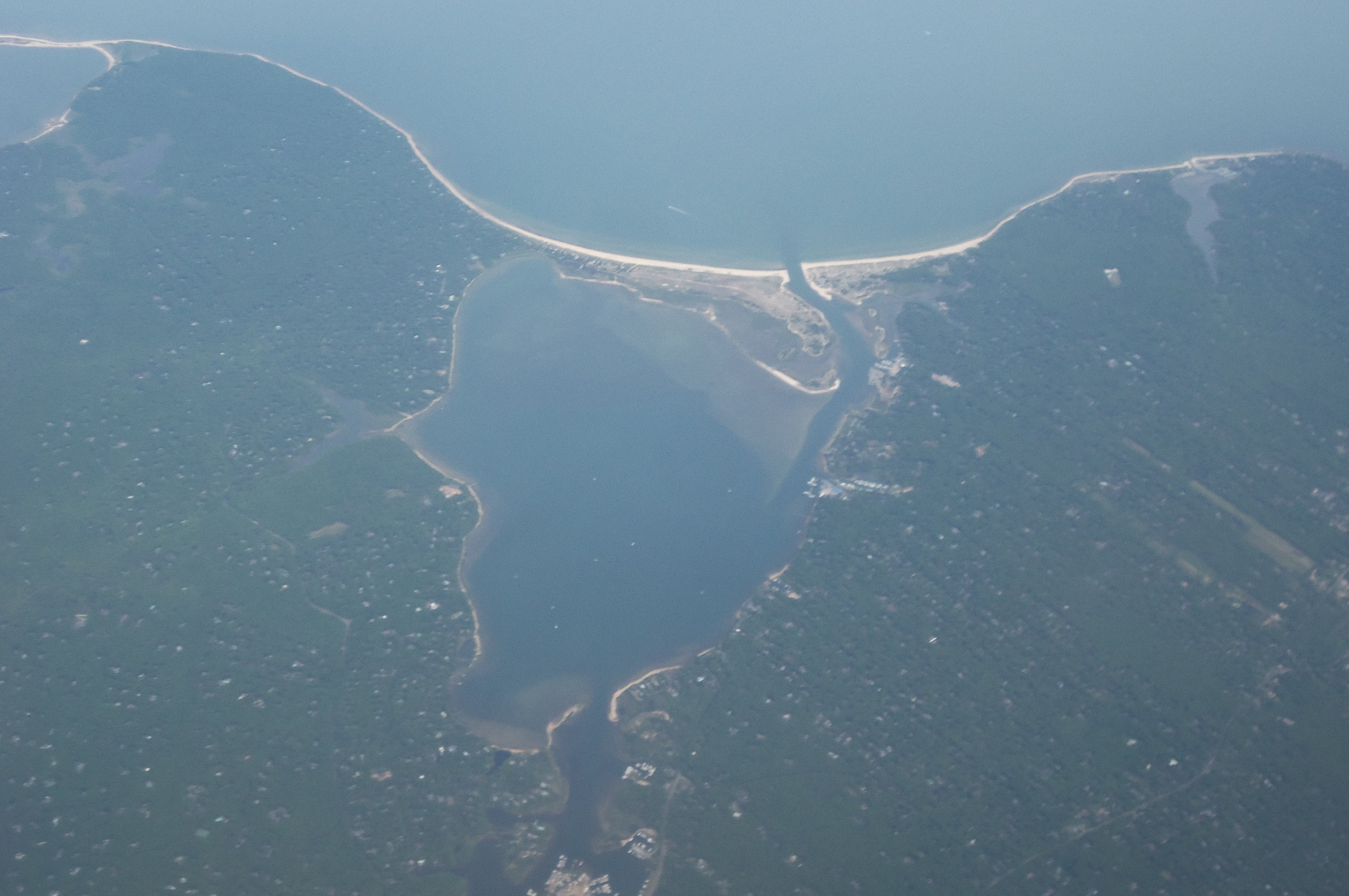
Three Mile Harbor (2021)

== Landmarks ==
- Ashawagh Hall
- Barnes's Country Store
- Charles Parsons Blacksmith Building
- Green River Cemetery
- Merrill Lake Sanctuary, owned by The Nature Conservancy
- Pollock-Krasner House and Studio
- Pussy's Pond Park
- Springs General Store
- Springs Historical Society (Springs Library)
- Springs School

== Beaches ==
- Accabonac Beach
- Barnes Hole Beach
- Clearwater Beach (private)
- Louse Point Beach
- Maidstone Park Beach
- Sammys Beach

== Education ==
The school district for the census-designated place is Springs Union Free School District.

== Notable people ==
- Joseph Heller (1923-1999) was an author of novels, short stories, plays, and screenplays.
- Lee Krasner (1908-1984) was an abstract expressionist painter and spouse of Jackson Pollock.
- Marijane Meaker (1927-2022) was an author of novels, children's stories, biographies, and is considered one of the founders of the lesbian pulp fiction genre.
- Jackson Pollock (1912-1956) was a painter and a major figure in the abstract expressionist movement.
