= Springs Union Free School District =

School district in the U.S. state of New York

Address
- 48 School Street East Hampton, Suffolk County, New York; United States

District information
- Type: Public
- Grades: PK-8
- Established: 1784 (first school); 1813 (district)
- President: Barbara Dayton
- Vice-president: Timothy Frazier
- Superintendent: Debra Winter
- Business administrator: Michael Henery
- Governing agency: New York State Education Department
- Schools: 1
- Budget: $30,800,134 (2021–22)
- NCES District ID: 3627900
- District ID: 580304020000

Students and staff
- Students: 723 (2019–20)
- Teachers: 70 FTE (2019–20)
- Staff: 42 FTE (2019–20)
- Student–teacher ratio: 10.337 (2019–20)

Other information
- Website: springsschool.org

Springs Union Free School District is a public school district located in East Hampton on Long Island, in Suffolk County, New York, United States. It educates students in the hamlet of Springs and the privately owned Gardiners Island.

The district operates one school, the Springs School, serving grades PK through 8. The total enrollment for the 2019–2020 school year was 723 students. Students then complete their education at the East Hampton High School as part of a tuition agreement with the East Hampton Union Free School District.

Christine Cleary is the school's principal and Debra Winter is the district's superintendent. Cleary has been principal since August 2020.

Springs is bordered by the East Hampton school district to the west and the Amagansett district to the south.

== History ==
=== Early years ===
In February 1784, East Hampton Town Trustees authorized the building of a schoolhouse in the "North Side" of the town. It thought to have been located on the land of Elisha Miller, and was auctioned off to them in 1807.

The second schoolhouse, which also served as place of worship, opened in 1807 at the authorization of a 32-man committee. It was either constructed at or moved to the Village Green at the corner of Fireplace Road and Old Stone Highway. The building was sold at an auction for $75 to Daniel King, who moved it to his home in Kingstown.

The school district was formally founded in 1813 as School District No. 4 of the town of East Hampton. The district also operated a school on Gardiners Island in 1884.

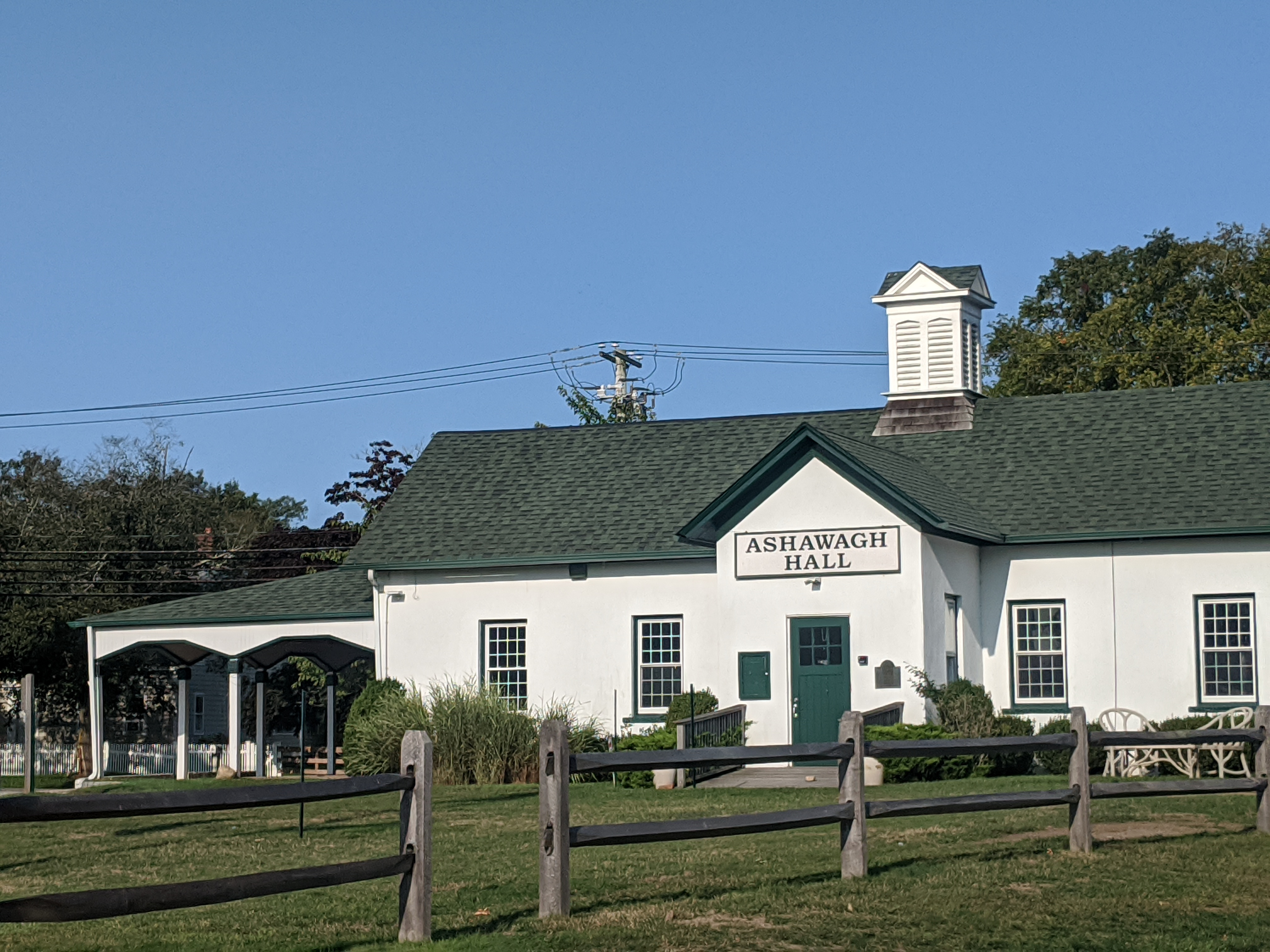
Ashawagh Hall in 2020

The third schoolhouse, which was the first public school in the district, was built on the site of its predecessor in 1847 at a cost of $418. It was known as the "Little Red Schoolhouse." In 1884, the school was expanded or rebuilt on the current site a cost of about $1,600. It was sold to the Springs Historical Society in 1909 for $1 and is now part of Ashawagh Hall. "Ashawagh" is the Montaukett word for "meeting place."

The fifth schoolhouse was the first school on the current School Street site. It was a wooden two-story building with four classrooms and was described as "one of the prettiest school buildings of its size in the county." The building burned to the ground in 1929, possibly due to an overheated chimney.

The current building is the sixth schoolhouse of the district. It opened in 1931 and was expanded in 1960 to accommodate junior high students. Previously, students were educated at East Hampton Middle School for grades 6 and up. Later additions to the building were completed in 1966 and 1974.

=== Recent history ===
In March 2018, voters approved a $23-million expansion project. Phase 1 installed a nitrogen-reducing septic system and Phase 2 added seven classrooms, a regulation-size gymnasium and athletic fields, as well as upgraded existing facilities in the school building. The project allowed for kindergarten and first grade classrooms, formerly in separate buildings on the campus, to consolidate under one roof. Prior to construction, the school was educating 743 students in a facility built for 400 students. Construction began in July 2019 and wrapped up in September 2021. Various errors in the construction project, which the district blamed on the architectural firm, cost at least $30,000 on top of the original project's budget.

Eric Casale, the school's longtime principal of 15 years, was granted a leave of absence in August 2020. Assistant Principal Christine Cleary became acting principal in his absence. Casale resigned from his post in December of that year and received a $300,000 settlement from the district for unknown reasons. In February 2021, Cleary's promotion was made permanent.

The district's pre-kindergarten program moved to the Springs Youth Association building, located just behind the school facilities, for the 2020–2021 school year. Previously, pre-K was contracted to the Eleanor Whitmore Early Childhood Center in East Hampton.
