= Abraham Pierson, the elder =

English Nonconformist clergyman

Abraham Pierson, the elder (1611–1678) was an English Nonconformist clergyman, known as a Congregational minister in New England. He reportedly came to the American colonies in 1639 to escape persecution for his Puritan views. Later, he and other emigrants from the Massachusetts Bay Colony formed a new township on Long Island which they named Southampton. His last relocation was in 1666, when Pierson and many of his church followers left the Connecticut Colony and established a new church and township at Newark, New Jersey.

== Early life ==
Born in Thornton, Bradford, West Ridings, Yorkshire, Pierson graduated B.A. from Trinity College, Cambridge, in 1632. That year he was found to be an unlicensed curate at All Saints' Church, Pavement, York. He was ordained deacon at York in September 1632. Family genealogy says he was ordained in Newark-on-Trent and this is how he chose the name for the New Jersey town he founded later in life.

On 19 March 1640, Pierson was summoned to the Court of High Commission, described as of Ardsley. He did not attend, and was fined. Family genealogy says he came to America in 1639, to escape persecution for his Puritan views. Pierson was in New England in the early part of 1640, and became ordained a Congregational minister in Boston.

== Pastor in New England ==
In 1640, Pierson and a party of emigrants from Lynn, Massachusetts formed a new township on Long Island, which they named Southampton. There Pierson remained as minister of the congregational church for four years. In 1644 this church became divided and a number of the inhabitants left. They united with another body from the township of Wethersfield and formed, under Pierson, a fresh church at a settlement at Branford, within the jurisdiction of the New Haven Colony.

== Later life ==
In 1666, Pierson moved again. The background to this was that a new charter was granted to the Connecticut Colony by King Charles II, incorporating New Haven with the colony, several of the townships of New Haven resisted. New Haven, rigidly ecclesiastical from the outset, had, like Massachusetts, made church membership a needful condition for the enjoyment of civic rights. No such restriction was imposed in Connecticut. Pierson disapproved of the Half-Way Covenant, and moved to pursue his vision of theocracy.

The men of Branford, were therefore supported by Pierson, when they opposed the union with Connecticut. When their opposition proved fruitless, they left their homes, leaving Branford almost empty of people. Taking their civil and ecclesiastical records with them, they established a fresh church and township at Newark. There Pierson died on 9 August 1678.

== Works ==
In 1659, Pierson published a pamphlet entitled Some Helps for the Indians, showing them how to improve their natural reason, to know the true God and the true Christian Religion. It is a short statement of the fundamental principles of monotheism, with a linear translation into the Quiripi language that Pierson made with Thomas Stanton and unnamed Quiripi translators. Verses in Latin by Pierson on the death of Theophilus Eaton have been published.

== Family ==
Pierson married Abigail Mitchell, daughter of Matthew Mitchell and Susan Wood. The often repeated claim that she was Abigail Wheelright was proven wrong in Winthrop, Massachusetts by Col. Charles Banks and Mr. Horace Dickerman of New Haven. Abraham and Abigail's son, the younger Abraham Pierson was the first rector, from 1701 to 1707, and one of the founders of, the Collegiate School — which later became Yale University; and their daughter Abigail married John, son of John Davenport (died 1670). At least six other children are mentioned.
