= East Hampton High School =

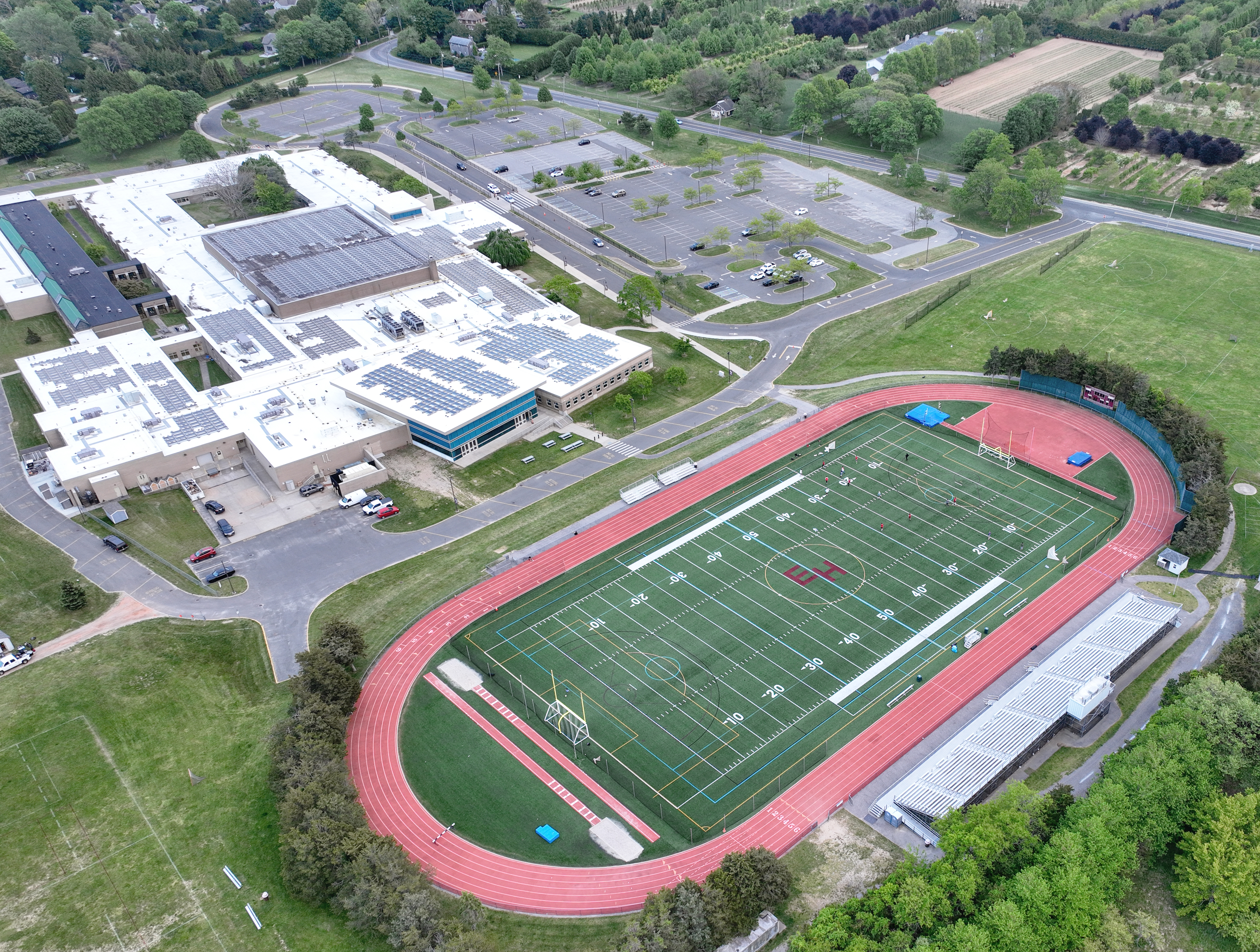
- Aerial view from 2023

Location
- 2 Long Lane; East Hampton, Suffolk County, New York; United States
- Coordinates: 40.9701°N 72.2001°W

Information
- Type: Public high school
- Established: 1785 (Clinton Academy); 1894 (Union School)
- School district: East Hampton Union Free School District
- NCES School ID: 360966000736
- Principal: Sara Smith
- Faculty: 88.73 FTE
- Grades: 9–12
- Enrollment: 1,026 (2023–2024)
- Student to teacher ratio: 11.56
- Colors: Maroon and gray
- Mascot: Bonackers
- Newspaper: Bonac Beachcomber
- Yearbook: The Bonacker
- Communities served: Town of East Hampton
- Website: www.easthamptonschools.org/highschool

East Hampton High School is a high school in East Hampton, Suffolk County, New York, United States. Located on the east end of Long Island, the school is the easternmost high school in New York State. It is part of the East Hampton Union Free School District, but also educates students in the neighboring communities of Wainscott, Springs, Amagansett, and Montauk as a result of tuition contracts with the respective local school districts.

In the 2019–2020 school year, the total enrollment was 920 students and the school had a four-year graduation rate of 82%. The current principal is Sara Smith, a former assistant principal at Southampton High School. Smith succeeded James Crenshaw, who resigned after one year to become assistant superintendent of Longwood Central School District further west on Long Island.

The school's sports teams are known as the Bonackers, and the school colors are maroon and gray.

== History ==
The school's history traces back to the Clinton Academy, which opened its doors in 1785. The school was named for former New York governor George Clinton. It ceased to be a school in 1881 when the state-charted academy system ended.

Land on Newtown Lane in the village of East Hampton was purchased from Isaac Osborn in 1894, allowing the school to move into a "larger and better-equipped" wooden building, according to a 1960 school handbook. This was known as the East Hampton Union School, and later, the East Hampton Grade and High School. The first graduating class in 1895 had six students.

In 1922, the grade school (one of two school buildings) was torn down to make way for a new facility. The high school building was moved to the corner of Main Street and Fithian Lane, replacing the original Clinton Academy as a municipal building,. A new brick school building opened in 1924 to serve primary and secondary education.

In 1961, elementary students moved to a new building, later named for elementary principal John M. Marshall. In 1970, high school students moved to the current facility on Long Lane, just outside the village boundary.

A$49-million expansion was completed in 2010. The project included 95,000 square feet (8,800 m^{2}) of new space and renovated 150,000 square feet (14,000 m^{2}) of existing space, including a new cafeteria, library, gymnasium, and district and school offices, and multi-purpose classrooms, as well as an energy-efficient "cool roof."

== Athletics ==
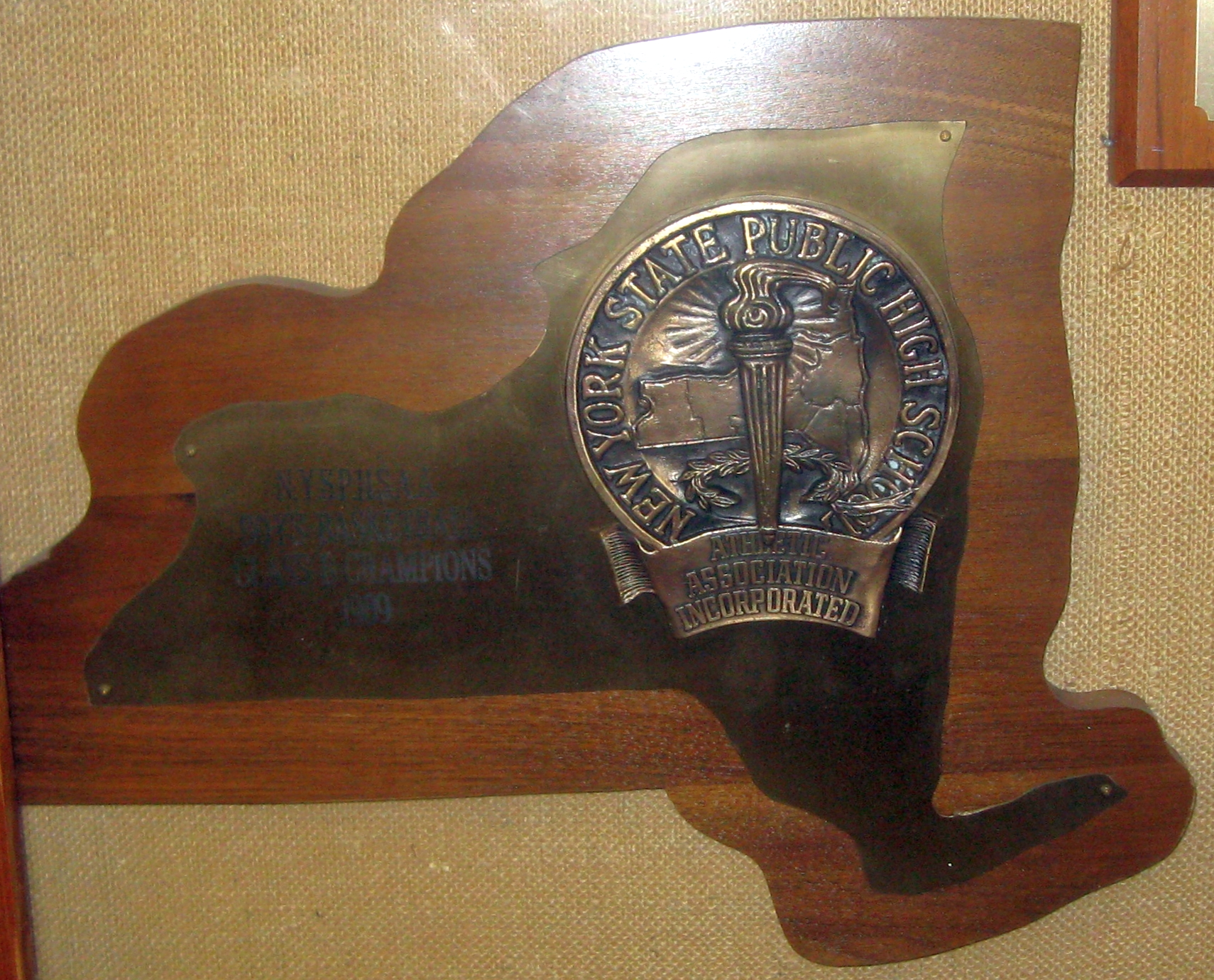
1989 basketball championship trophy in East Hampton, New York

The school won the New York State Public High School Athletic Association Boys Basketball Championships Class B in 1989 and placed second in Class A in 2008. The state championship tournament system began in 1979. East Hampton won 1977 state championship in Division A (the tournament was consolidate for all divisions in 1979) and its star player was future NBA player Howard Wood. Wood's younger brother Kenny Wood played for the 1989 team. Both players were coached by Ed Petrie (1933–2015) who coached East Hampton from 1969 until 2010 when he retired at age 77 (including all state title appearances). Petrie had 754 wins with various eastern Lond Island schools—setting a New York state coaching record. The basketball court is named for Petrie. Petrie was drafted 12th round (84th pick) of the 1956 NBA draft out of the Seton Hall Pirates by the New York Knicks but only played in the minor leagues for the Hazelton Jets and New Haven Bears before coaching high school.

The school did not field varsity football teams in 2017, 2018, and 2019 because school officials said they could not field 22 people on the team. The school had traditionally in New York Division IV. The school has rejected a proposal to join with Southampton, Sag Harbor and Bridgehampton for football but the combined schools would then complete in Division I which is for Long Island's biggest schools. New York State does not have a true state championship in football as New York City and Long Island schools do not compete. The highest level is the Long Island Football Championships and East Hampton has not appeared in any of those games. They did however reach the postseason in 2009–2010 after compelling a 5–3 record. They would go on to lose to No. 1 seeded Sayville 17–6.

== Notable alumni ==
- Paul Annacone, professional tennis player and coach
- Cole Brauer, open-water sailor
- Charnele Brown, actress and regular on A Different World
- David Carmichael, pastry chef
- E. Virgil Conway, attorney and Metropolitan Transportation Authority chairman
- Perry B. Duryea Jr., New York State politician
- Bran Ferren, technologist and former president of Walt Disney Imagineering
- Ross Gload, professional baseball player
- Hilary Thayer Hamann, author of Anthropology of an American Girl
- Howard Wood, professional basketball player (a member of EHHS team's 1977 state championship team and whose younger brother Ken was a member of 1989 championship team)

== Notable faculty ==
- Frank Sprig Gardner, wrestling coach
