= New Hyde Park-Garden City Park Union Free School District =

School district in New York, United States

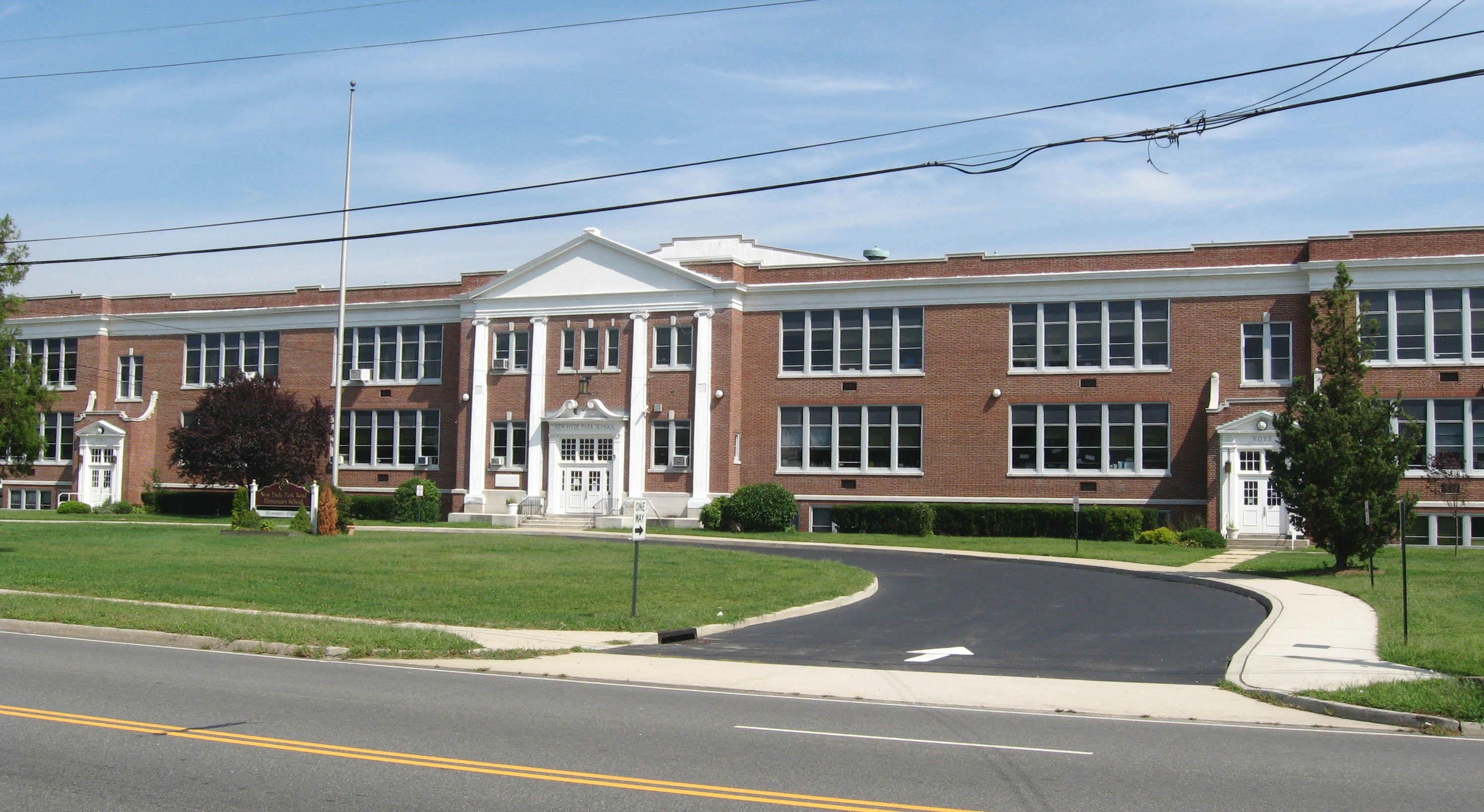
The New Hyde Park Road Elementary School

The New Hyde Park-Garden City Park Union Free School District is a public school district serving much of the Greater New Hyde Park area of Nassau County, in New York, United States.

== Description ==
The district includes most of the Village of New Hyde Park and most of the North New Hyde Park and Garden City Park census-designated places. It is an elementary school district, with all of its schools exclusively covering grades pre-kindergarten through 6; the district feeds into the Sewanhaka Central High School District for grades 7 through 12.

The New Hyde Park-Garden City Park Union Free School District is headquartered on the property of the Manor Oaks School, in within North New Hyde Park.

== History ==
In 1985, Guidelines Inc. president Robert F. Savitt argued that the district should become a full Kindergarten through 12 district and take land away from the Sewanhaka Central High School District.

Joseph Rudaitis was superintendent until 2005, when Regina Cohn took the position due to Rudaitis' retirement.

== Schools ==
The New Hyde Park–Garden City Park Union Free School District includes the following schools:

- Garden City Park School
- Hillside Grade School
- Manor Oaks School
- New Hyde Park Road School

== See also ==
- Elmont Union free School District
- Floral Park-Bellerose Union Free School District
- Franklin Square Union Free School District
