= Garden City Park, New York =

Garden City Park, New York Clowesville, New York
- Hamlet and census-designated place
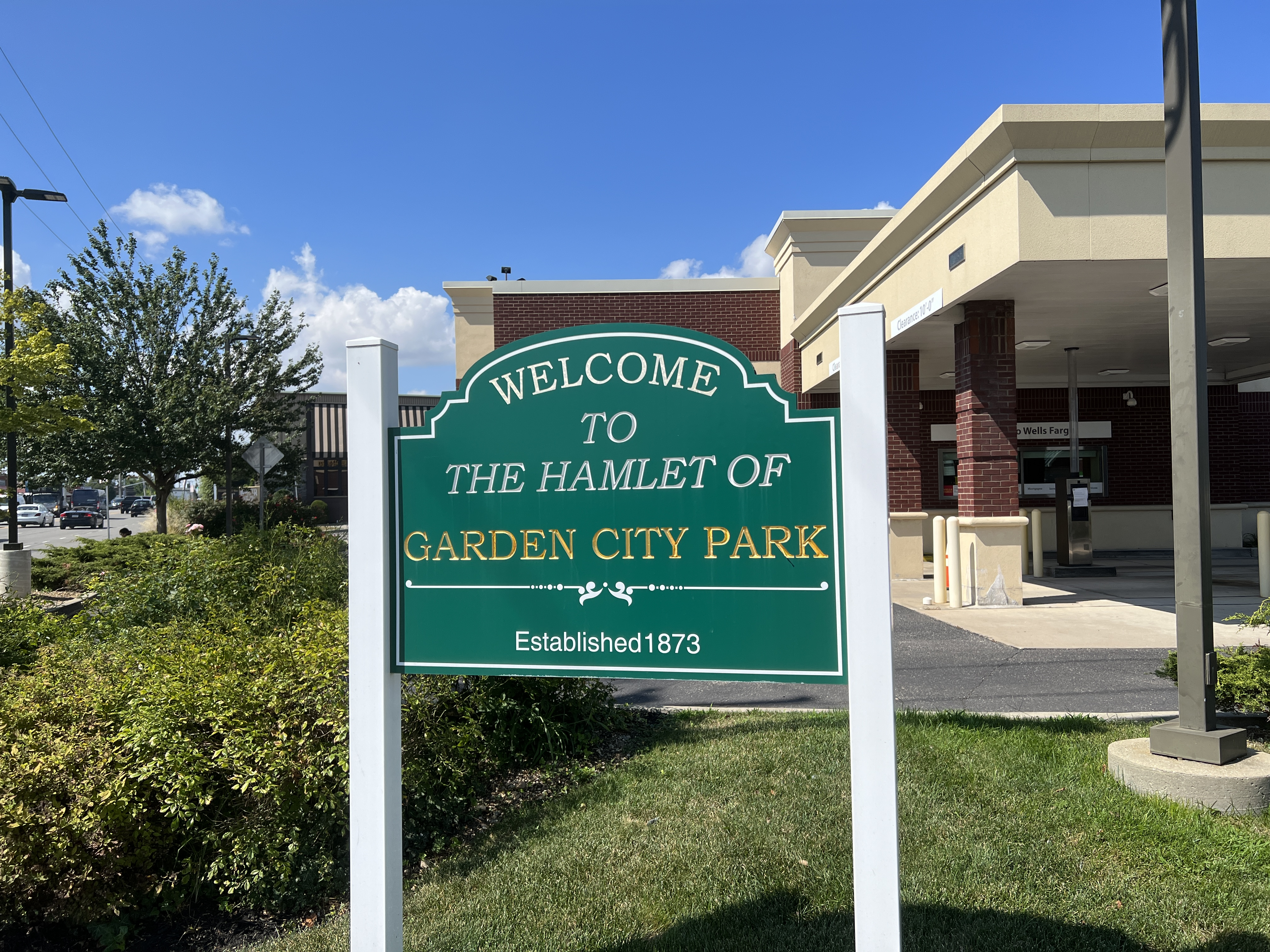
- A Garden City Park welcome sign in 2022

- Location in Nassau County and the state of New York

- Location on Long Island Location within the state of New York
- Coordinates: 40°44′35″N 73°39′46″W
- Country: United States
- State: New York
- County: Nassau
- Town: North Hempstead
- Named for: Its proximity to Garden City

Area
  - Total: 1.00 sq mi (2.58 km^{2})
  - Land: 0.99 sq mi (2.57 km^{2})
  - Water: 0.0039 sq mi (0.01 km^{2})
- Elevation: 105 ft (32 m)

Population (2020)
  - Total: 7,985
  - Density: 8,044.6/sq mi (3,106.03/km^{2})
- Time zone: UTC-5 (Eastern (EST))
  - Summer (DST): UTC-4 (EDT)
- ZIP code: 11040
- Area codes: 516, 363
- FIPS code: 36-28189
- GNIS feature ID: 0950876

Garden City Park, historically known as Clowesville, is a hamlet and census-designated place (CDP) located within the Town of North Hempstead in Nassau County, on Long Island, in New York, United States. It is considered part of the Greater New Hyde Park area. The population was 7,985 at the time of the 2020 census.

== History ==
From about 1787 until about 1874, the area was known as Clowesville, which was then the County Seat of Queens County, and contained the county courthouse and jail.

The community's name was eventually changed to Garden City Park due to its proximity to the then-new development of Garden City.

On December 7, 1993, six people were killed and nineteen were injured in a racially-motivated mass shooting aboard an eastbound Long Island Rail Road train at the Merillion Avenue station – Garden City Park's local LIRR station.

== Geography ==
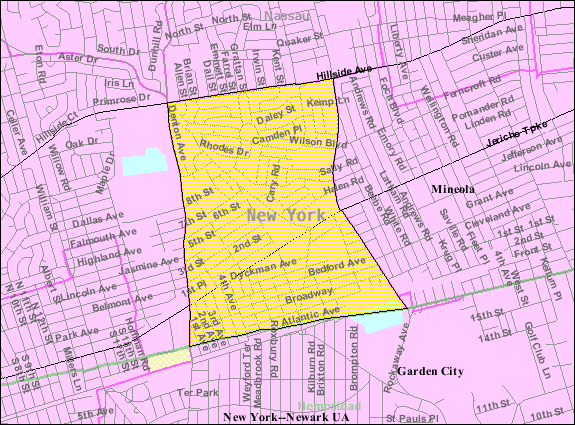
U.S. Census map of Garden City Park

According to the United States Census Bureau, the CDP has a total area of 1 square mile (2.6 km^{2}), all land.

Garden City Park is bordered by Hillside Avenue to the north, Herricks Road to the east, and Denton Avenue to the west. The southern border is the boundary of the Town of North Hempstead with the Town of Hempstead, roughly coinciding with Atlantic Avenue and the Main Line of the Long Island Rail Road (LIRR). The local LIRR station – partially located within Garden City Park and partially in the Village of Garden City – is Merillon Avenue.

Some local and town maps reflect that Garden City Park spills over north into Herricks. Mail delivery is provided by the New Hyde Park Post Office utilizing the 11040 ZIP Code.

A suburb of New York City, the hamlet is located approximately 20 miles (32 km) to the east of Midtown Manhattan.

=== Climate ===
According to the Köppen climate classification, Garden City Park has a Humid subtropical climate (type Cfa) with cool, wet winters and hot, humid summers. Precipitation is uniform throughout the year, with slight spring and fall peaks.

Climate data for Garden City Park, New York, 1991–2020 normals, extremes 1999–present
Month	Jan	Feb	Mar	Apr	May	Jun	Jul	Aug	Sep	Oct	Nov	Dec	Year
Record high °F (°C)	71 (22)	73 (23)	85 (29)	94 (34)	97 (36)	103 (39)	105 (41)	104 (40)	100 (38)	90 (32)	83 (28)	76 (24)	105 (41)
Mean daily maximum °F (°C)	39 (4)	43 (6)	50 (10)	61 (16)	70 (21)	80 (27)	85 (29)	83 (28)	76 (24)	65 (18)	55 (13)	45 (7)	63 (17)
Mean daily minimum °F (°C)	26 (−3)	28 (−2)	34 (1)	42 (6)	51 (11)	61 (16)	66 (19)	65 (18)	58 (14)	48 (9)	40 (4)	31 (−1)	46 (8)
Record low °F (°C)	−10 (−23)	−7 (−22)	3 (−16)	13 (−11)	32 (0)	43 (6)	50 (10)	48 (9)	38 (3)	27 (−3)	10 (−12)	−1 (−18)	−10 (−23)
Average precipitation inches (mm)	3.62 (92)	3.17 (81)	4.35 (110)	4.15 (105)	3.90 (99)	3.85 (98)	4.40 (112)	3.72 (94)	3.91 (99)	4.08 (104)	3.73 (95)	3.82 (97)	46.7 (1,186)
Source: The Weather Channel

==== Plant zone ====
According to the United States Department of Agriculture (USDA), Garden City Park is located within hardiness zone 7b.

== Demographics ==
Historical population
Census	Pop.	Note	%±
2000	7,554		—
2010	7,806		3.3%
2020	7,985		2.3%
U.S. Decennial Census

=== 2020 census ===
As of the 2020 census, Garden City Park had a population of 7,985. The median age was 44.1 years. 19.9% of residents were under the age of 18 and 21.7% of residents were 65 years of age or older. For every 100 females there were 96.1 males, and for every 100 females age 18 and over there were 94.8 males age 18 and over.

100.0% of residents lived in urban areas, while 0.0% lived in rural areas.

There were 2,499 households in Garden City Park, of which 35.8% had children under the age of 18 living in them. Of all households, 66.1% were married-couple households, 11.7% were households with a male householder and no spouse or partner present, and 19.8% were households with a female householder and no spouse or partner present. About 15.6% of all households were made up of individuals and 10.8% had someone living alone who was 65 years of age or older.

There were 2,592 housing units, of which 3.6% were vacant. The homeowner vacancy rate was 0.9% and the rental vacancy rate was 2.6%.

Racial composition as of the 2020 census
Race	Number	Percent
White	2,839	35.6%
Black or African American	231	2.9%
American Indian and Alaska Native	37	0.5%
Asian	3,747	46.9%
Native Hawaiian and Other Pacific Islander	2	0.0%
Some other race	500	6.3%
Two or more races	629	7.9%
Hispanic or Latino (of any race)	999	12.5%

=== 2010 census ===
As of the census of 2010, there were 7,806 people, 2,508 households, and 1,993 families living in the CDP. The population density was 7,759.3 inhabitants per square mile (2,995.9/km^{2}). There were 2,548 housing units at an average density of 2,617.3 per square mile (1,010.5/km^{2}). The racial makeup of the CDP was 48.6% Non-Hispanic White, 3.8% African American, 0.3% Native American, 33.1% Asian, 0.1% Pacific Islander, 3.8% from other races, and 2.6% from two or more races. Hispanic or Latino of any race were 12.1% of the population.

There were 2,508 households, out of which 33.9% had children under the age of 18 living with them, 66.3% were married couples living together, 9.9% had a female householder with no husband present, and 20.5% were non-families. 18.2% of all households were made up of individuals, and 12.8% had someone living alone who was 65 years of age or older. The average household size was 3.01 and the average family size was 3.43.

In the CDP, the population was spread out, with 22.4% under the age of 18, 7.5% from 18 to 24, 26.3% from 25 to 44, 24.8% from 45 to 64, and 19.0% who were 65 years of age or older. The median age was 41 years. For every 100 females, there were 92.5 males. For every 100 females age 18 and over, there were 88.1 males.

The median income for a household in the CDP was $74,746, and the median income for a family was $81,580. Males had a median income of $47,234 versus $38,580 for females. The per capita income for the CDP was $29,250. About 0.4% of families and 1.0% of the population were below the poverty line, including 0.3% of those under age 18 and 2.2% of those age 65 or over.

=== 2000 census ===
As of the census of 2000, there were 7,554 people, 2,508 households, and 1,993 families living in the CDP. The population density was 7,759.3 inhabitants per square mile (2,995.9/km^{2}). There were 2,548 housing units at an average density of 2,617.3 per square mile (1,010.5/km^{2}). The racial makeup of the CDP was 70.20% White, 4.21% African American, 0.28% Native American, 20.49% Asian, 0.03% Pacific Islander, 2.13% from other races, and 2.66% from two or more races. Hispanic or Latino of any race were 8.09% of the population.

There were 2,508 households, out of which 33.9% had children under the age of 18 living with them, 66.3% were married couples living together, 9.9% had a female householder with no husband present, and 20.5% were non-families. 18.2% of all households were made up of individuals, and 12.8% had someone living alone who was 65 years of age or older. The average household size was 3.01 and the average family size was 3.43.

In the CDP, the population was spread out, with 22.4% under the age of 18, 7.5% from 18 to 24, 26.3% from 25 to 44, 24.8% from 45 to 64, and 19.0% who were 65 years of age or older. The median age was 41 years. For every 100 females, there were 92.5 males. For every 100 females age 18 and over, there were 88.1 males.

The median income for a household in the CDP was $74,746, and the median income for a family was $81,580. Males had a median income of $47,234 versus $38,580 for females. The per capita income for the CDP was $29,250. About 0.4% of families and 1.0% of the population were below the poverty line, including 0.3% of those under age 18 and 2.2% of those age 65 or over.

== Government ==
=== Town representation ===
As an unincorporated area of the Town of North Hempstead, Garden City Park is directly governed by said Town, which is seated in Manhasset.

Garden City Park is split between the Town of North Hempstead's and 3rd and 4th council districts, which as of August 2025 are represented on the North Hempstead Town Council by Dennis J. Walsh (R–Mineola) and Christine Liu (D–Herricks), respectively.

==== County representation ====
Garden City Park is located within Nassau County's 9th Legislative district, which as of August 2025 is represented in the Nassau County Legislature by Scott Strauss (R–Mineola).

==== State representation ====
===== New York State Assembly =====
Garden City Park is split between the New York State Assembly's 16th and 19th State Assembly districts, which as of August 2025 are represented in the New York State Assembly by Daniel J. Norber (R–Great Neck) and Edward P. Ra (R–Garden City South), respectively.

===== New York State Senate =====
Garden City Park is located in the New York State Senate's 7th State Senate district, which as of August 2025 is represented in the New York State Senate by Jack M. Martins (R–Old Westbury).

==== Federal representation ====
===== United States Congress =====
Garden City Park is located within New York's 3rd Congressional district, which as of August 2025 is represented in the United States Congress by Thomas R. Suozzi (D–Glen Cove).

===== United States Senate =====
Like the rest of New York, Garden City Park is represented in the United States Senate by Charles Schumer (D) and Kirsten Gillibrand (D).

=== Politics ===
In the 2024 United States presidential election, roughly half of Garden City Park voters voted for Donald J. Trump (R), while the other half voted for Kamala D. Harris (D).

== Education ==
Garden City Park is divided among these school districts:

- New Hyde Park-Garden City Park Union Free School District and Sewanhaka Central High School District
- Herricks Union Free School District
- Mineola Union Free School District

Additionally, Mineola High School is located within the hamlet.

== See also ==
- Garden City South, New York
- East Garden City, New York
