= Sewanhaka Central High School District =

School district in New York, United States

The Sewanhaka Central High School District is a central high school district located in western Nassau County on Long Island, in New York State. The district is currently composed of five high schools: Sewanhaka High School, Elmont Memorial High School, New Hyde Park Memorial High School, Floral Park Memorial High School, and H. Frank Carey High School.

The schools are fed from separate elementary school districts in the various communities, each having its own board of education.

The Current Superintendent of Sewanhaka Central High School district is Regina M Agrusa.

The district includes:

- Bellerose, Bellerose Terrace, Floral Park, Garden City South, New Hyde Park, South Floral Park, and Stewart Manor
- most of Elmont
- portions of Franklin Square, Garden City Park, Garden City Park, North New Hyde Park North Valley Stream, Garden City and West Hempstead

== History ==
The Sewanhaka Central High School district was created around 1929 with the building of Sewanhaka High School, the first high school in the current district. In the 1950s and 1960s, the additional high schools were built to accommodate the growing population. Notable alumni include longtime NFL quarterback Vinny Testaverde, Olympic discus champion Al Oerter, and actor Telly Savalas (Kojak).

A superintendent surnamed Williams began his term as superintendent in 2004. In 2006, he resigned.

In 2019, Muslim families began advocating for such a student holiday for Eid al-Fitr. In 2021 the school began having a student holiday for Eid al-Fitr.

== Governance ==
Each of the elementary school districts that coincides with this high school district designates two board members as concurrent board members of this district. As of 2003 no positions on the board are directly elected by voters.

== Schools ==
- Sewanhaka High School was the first high school in the district and also the first in the district to receive the Blue Ribbon Recognition (It was nationally prominent in the 1930s as America's #3 school.)
- Floral Park Memorial High School is located in Floral Park.
- Elmont Memorial High School is located in Elmont.
- New Hyde Park Memorial High School is located in North New Hyde Park.
- H. Frank Carey Junior-Senior High School is located in Franklin Square.

== Feeder districts ==
The following elementary school districts graduate to attend schools in the Sewanhaka Central High School District:

- Elmont Union Free School District
- Floral Park-Bellerose Union Free School District
- Franklin Square Union Free School District
- New Hyde Park-Garden City Park Union Free School District
