= Franklin Square Union Free School District =

School district in the U.S. state of New York

The Franklin Square Union Free School District is an elementary school district located within Franklin Square, in Nassau County, New York, United States.

The superintendent is Dr. Jared T. Bloom.

== Description ==
Its students are enrolled in three elementary schools, John Street School, Polk Street School and Washington Street School, with Washington Street School having the highest test rates in the district; students attend the district's schools from Pre-Kindergarten through Grade 6.

The district feeds into the Sewanhaka Central High School District, which has five high schools. Most Franklin Square students continue their education at H. Frank Carey Junior/Senior High School, though it is possible for students to attend one of the other schools in the high school district. The district includes portions of Franklin Square, West Hempstead, Garden City, and all of Garden City South. Some catholic students who don’t want to go to H Frank Carey may also choose to go to Kellenberg Memorial High School from grades 6-12 or Chaminade High School and go to H Frank Carey for 7-8 and then go to Chaminade High School for Grades 9-12.

St. Catherine of Siena Catholic School, of the Roman Catholic Diocese of Rockville Centre, was scheduled to close in 2012, so the Franklin Square UFSD no longer needed to transport students to and from that school. Former FSUFSD superintendent Patrick Manley anticipated that his district would gain 39 students from the closure.

== See also ==
- Elmont Union free School District
- Floral Park-Bellerose Union Free School District
- New Hyde Park-Garden City Park Union Free School District
