= Garden City South, New York =

- Hamlet and census-designated place
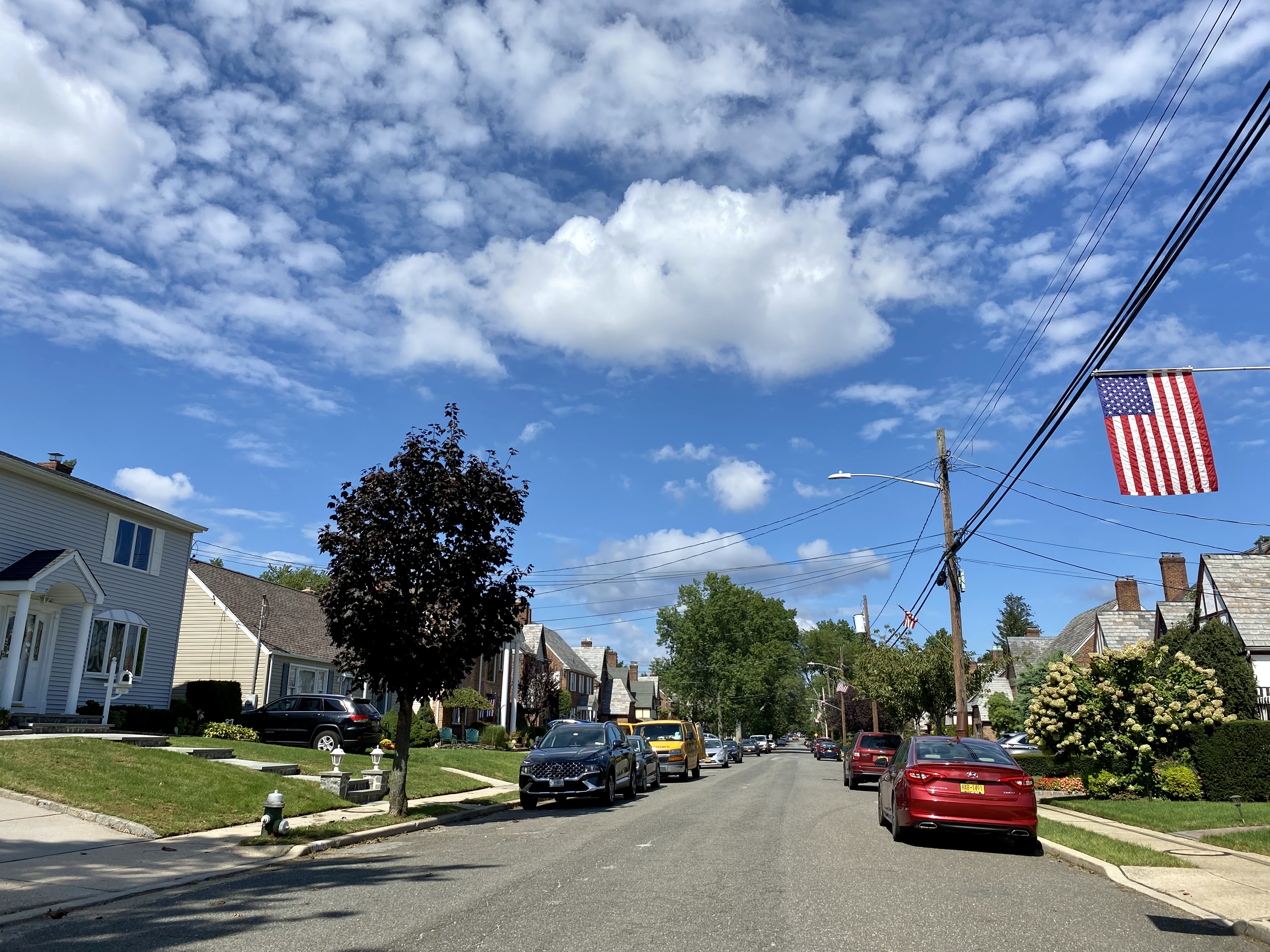
- A street in Garden City South in 2021

- Location in Nassau County and the state of New York

- Location on Long Island Location within the state of New York
- Coordinates: 40°42′47″N 73°39′37″W
- Country: United States
- State: New York
- County: Nassau
- Town: Hempstead
- Named for: Its location south of Garden City

Area
  - Total: 0.40 sq mi (1.03 km^{2})
  - Land: 0.40 sq mi (1.03 km^{2})
  - Water: 0 sq mi (0.00 km^{2})
- Elevation: 69 ft (21 m)

Population (2020)
  - Total: 4,119
  - Density: 10,328.4/sq mi (3,987.82/km^{2})
- Time zone: UTC-5 (Eastern (EST))
  - Summer (DST): UTC-4 (EDT)
- ZIP Codes: 11530 (Garden City); 11010 (Franklin Square); 11552 (West Hempstead)
- Area codes: 516, 363
- FIPS code: 36-28200
- GNIS feature ID: 0950877

Garden City South is a hamlet and census-designated place (CDP) in the Town of Hempstead, in Nassau County, on Long Island, in New York, United States. The population was 4,119 at the time of the 2020 census.

== History ==
Garden City South's name reflects upon its geographic location south of the Village of Garden City.

== Geography ==
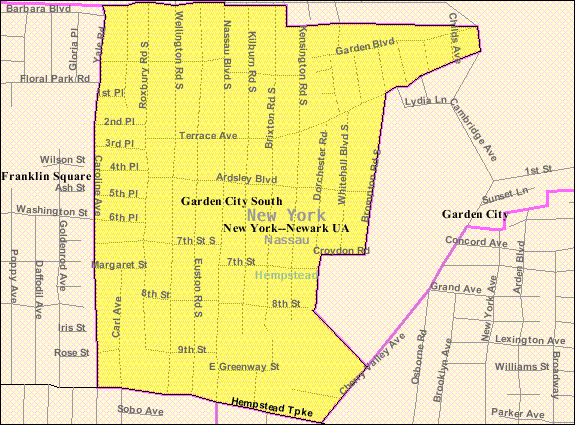
U.S. Census map of Garden City South

According to the United States Census Bureau, the CDP has a total area of 0.4 square miles (1.0 km^{2}), all land.

== Demographics ==
Historical population
Census	Pop.	Note	%±
2000	3,974		—
2010	4,024		1.3%
2020	4,119		2.4%
U.S. Decennial Census

=== 2020 census ===
As of the 2020 census, Garden City South had a population of 4,119. The median age was 43.6 years. 20.3% of residents were under the age of 18 and 19.4% of residents were 65 years of age or older. For every 100 females there were 91.9 males, and for every 100 females age 18 and over there were 88.6 males age 18 and over.

100.0% of residents lived in urban areas, while 0.0% lived in rural areas.

There were 1,401 households in Garden City South, of which 34.7% had children under the age of 18 living in them. Of all households, 62.1% were married-couple households, 10.6% were households with a male householder and no spouse or partner present, and 23.6% were households with a female householder and no spouse or partner present. About 17.5% of all households were made up of individuals and 11.3% had someone living alone who was 65 years of age or older.

There were 1,454 housing units, of which 3.6% were vacant. The homeowner vacancy rate was 0.0% and the rental vacancy rate was 8.1%.

Racial composition as of the 2020 census
Race	Number	Percent
White	3,260	79.1%
Black or African American	46	1.1%
American Indian and Alaska Native	8	0.2%
Asian	348	8.4%
Native Hawaiian and Other Pacific Islander	0	0.0%
Some other race	181	4.4%
Two or more races	276	6.7%
Hispanic or Latino (of any race)	475	11.5%

=== Demographic estimates ===
The median household income was $146,346 and those with a bachelor's degree or Higher at 49.1% and an employment Rate of 62.4%.

== Government ==
=== Town representation ===
As an unincorporated community within the Town of Hempstead, Garden City South is directly governed by said Town, which is seated in the Village of Hempstead.

Garden City South is located in the Town of Hempstead's 2nd council district, which as of August 2025 is represented on the Hempstead Town Council by Thomas E. Muscarella (R–Garden City).

=== Representation in higher government ===
==== Nassau County representation ====
Garden City South is located in Nassau County's 8th Legislative district, which as of August 2025 is represented in the Nassau County Legislature by John J. Giuffrè (R–Stewart Manor).

==== New York State representation ====
===== New York State Assembly =====
Garden City South is located in the New York State Assembly's 19th State Assembly district, which as of August 2025 is represented in the New York State Assembly by resident Edward P. Ra (R–Garden City South).

===== New York State Senate =====
Garden City South is located in the New York State Senate's 6th State Senate district, which as of August 2025 is represented in the New York State Senate by Siela A. Bynoe (D–Westbury).

==== Federal representation ====
===== United States Congress =====
Garden City South is located within New York's 4th Congressional district, which as of August 2025 is represented in the United States Congress by Laura A. Gillen (D-Baldwin).

===== United States Senate =====
Like the rest of New York, Garden City South is represented in the United States Senate by Charles Schumer (D) and Kirsten Gillibrand (D).

=== Politics ===
In the 2024 United States presidential election, the majority of Garden City South voters voted for Donald Trump (R).

== Education ==
Garden City South is located within the boundaries of (and is thus served by) the Franklin Square Union Free School District and the Sewanhaka Central High School District. The former serves students through grade six, while the latter serves children in grades seven through twelve.

== Notable people ==
- Rudolph "Rudy" W. Giuliani – Attorney; former Mayor of New York City.
- Edward "Ed" P. Ra – Politician; member of the New York State Assembly.

== See also ==
- List of census-designated places in New York
- Garden City Park, New York
- East Garden City, New York
