= John P. Shanley =

American journalist (1915–1985)

John P. Shanley (September 10, 1915 – November 28, 1985) was an American journalist, specializing in radio, television and drama. He worked for The New York Times from 1937 to 1963, winning five publisher's awards.

A New York City native, Shanley attended Fordham University and was employed as a copyboy by The New York Times in 1937, the year he graduated with a bachelor's degree. Soon thereafter he was promoted to general assignment reporter, remaining in the position until World War II, when he took a leave of absence to enlist in the Army and serve in counterintelligence at such theaters of war as China, Burma, India and North Africa.

Returning to The Times after the war, he became, in 1948, assistant editor of the drama news department and was assigned, as editor, to cover radio and television in 1954, when he also joined the faculty of his alma mater, Fordham, as a part-time professor of communications, continuing to teach there until 1961. After contributing scores of articles and reviews, mostly about various productions of 1950s and early 1960s television, he left The Times in 1963 and joined New York City's independent TV station, WOR Channel 9, as well as WOR radio, in the position of public relations director. Four years later, in 1968, he accepted the position of assistant to the president of Brooklyn's Pratt Institute which specializes in architecture, interior design and industrial design. After another three years, he moved to another of the city's institutes of higher learning, York College, a part of the City University of New York in Queens, where he remained as director of college relations until retiring in 1980.

Shanley was 70 years old and residing the Long Island suburb of Bellerose Village, when he died of lung cancer at the Mercy Hospice in nearby Rockville Centre. He and his wife, Regina Claire O'Brien, were the parents of five sons and two daughters. He is buried at Calverton National Cemetery.
