= Elmont Memorial High School =

High school in Nassau County, New York, United States

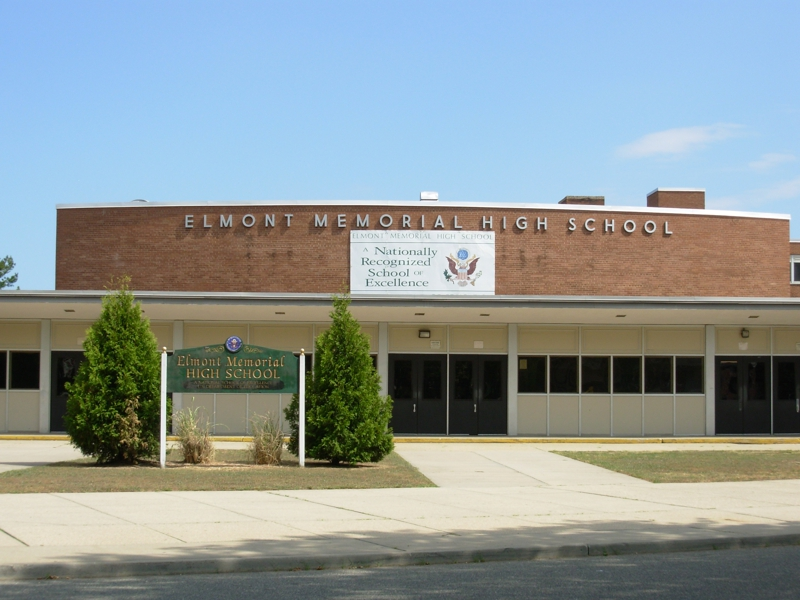
- Elmont Memorial High School in 2010

Location
- 555 Ridge Road; Elmont, Nassau County, New York; United States; 40°41′50″N 73°43′06″W

Information
- Type: public secondary school
- Established: 1956
- School district: Sewanhaka Central High School District
- NCES School ID: 362652003626
- Principal: Antonio Santana
- Faculty: 116.15 FTEs
- Grades: 7–12
- Enrollment: 1,473 (as of 2023-2024)
- Student to teacher ratio: 12.68:1
- Colors: Green and white
- Team name: Spartans
- Newspaper: Elmont Phoenix
- Yearbook: LOG
- Website: Official website

Elmont Memorial High School (EMHS) is a public secondary school founded in 1956 for students in grades 7–12 in the hamlet of Elmont, New York, in Nassau County on Long Island. The school is one of five secondary schools in the Sewanhaka Central High School District. As of the 2023-24 school year, the school enrolled 1473 students.

== Awards and recognition ==
In 1991, Elmont Memorial High School was named a National Blue Ribbon School by the United States Department of Education, the highest award an American school can receive.

In 2005, Elmont High School had 23 black students score a 3 or higher on the World History Advanced Placement exam, the most in the country. Elmont Memorial from 1995–2006 had a 97% graduation rate, and in 2004 achieved a 100% graduation rate, a first in the Sewanhaka Central District.

== Faculty and staff ==
The school's current principal is Antonio Santana.

In August 2022, Principal Dougherty went on a sabbatical leave for unknown reasons and returned on October 11, 2022. Principal Dougherty resigned as Principal at the end of the 2022-2023 school year.

== Academics ==
(adapted from the Sewanhaka Central High School District Catalog of Courses)

Levels of Study

Students may pursue one of two levels of study:

- Advanced: This is an accelerated program of instruction in which students are expected to maintain a grade point average of at least 85% to continue to the next advanced course in the sequence.
- Regents: Students pursue courses in the curriculum prescribed by the New York State Department of Education.

Grades 7 and 8

- Students are organized into "teams". The teams will stop after 9th grade. There are two teams:Green and White.Formerly, the schools had the Lions (Regular), Hurricanes (Regular), and Direwolves (Advanced). Teams are composed of students and core teachers in math, science, English, and social studies. This allows for the individual attention necessary for success at an early stage in secondary education.
- During the junior high school years, students pursue studies in English, Social Studies, Mathematics, Science, Foreign Languages, Music, Physical Education, Art, Family and Consumer Sciences(FACS)Health Education, Medical Detectives, Woodshop(now Tech and Modeling) and Language Enrichment, as well as vocational studies. High school credit is awarded to eighth graders that pursue advanced coursework in science, mathematics, foreign language, and music.
- Teams include Advanced and Regular students. The regular team is divided into two separate teams based on students' last name.

Grades 9-12

- High school coursework is designed to fulfill requirements necessary for students interested in attending two-year colleges, four-year colleges, vocational schools, nursing programs, etc. Students receive either a Regents Diploma or Advanced Regents Diploma upon graduation.

== Music ==
The school has several performing arts groups, and credit is given for students in these groups. They include (note that there are separate groups at each school level):

- Orchestra (at the High School or Junior High School level)
- Concert Band (at the High School, 9th Grade, and Junior High School levels)
- Concert Choir (at the High School and Junior High School levels)
- Jazz Band
- Jazz Choir
- String Ensemble
- Marching Band

Students perform each year during the Winter and Spring Concerts, local events, and music competitions. Some students participate in their respective musical groups at the All-District, All-County, Long Island Invitational, NYSSMA, and All-State levels, or join the Tri-M Music Honor Society.

Students may also pursue coursework in Music Theory.

Each year the Music Department puts on two theatre productions, a drama and a musical. Musicals the school has performed in the past include Dreamgirls, Les Misérables, The Wiz, Once On This Island, Aida, Cinderella(as of 2024), Clue(Nov.2025) and Guys and Dolls.

== Athletics ==
The colors of the EMHS Spartans are green and white. Sports are offered at the Junior High, Junior Varsity, and Varsity levels and include:

- Basketball
- Soccer
- Baseball
- Riflery(discontinued)
- Football

- Softball
- Lacrosse
- Gymnastics (District)
- Swimming (District)
- Wrestling

- Volleyball
- Track
- Golf (District)
- Gymnastics
- Bowling (District)

- Track and Field
- Cheerleading (Junior High [7th and 8th grade], Junior Varsity [9th and 10th grade], and Varsity [11th and 12th grade])
- Weight Lifting

== Notable alumni ==
- Nelson DeMille (born 1943), author
- Anthony Elechi (born 1993), basketball player who plays overseas
- Chelsea Hammond (born 1983), long jumper for Jamaica Olympic team (2008)
- Gary Marangi (born 1952), football quarterback
- Alan Peckolick (1940–2017), graphic designer
- Billy Phillips (born 1956) soccer goalkeeper and coach
- Rich the Kid (born 1992), rapper, singer, songwriter, record producer, record executive, and actor
- Marco Rivera (born 1972), football guard
- Bob Rozakis (born 1951), comic book writer and editor, creator of Bumblebee, The Calculator, Mister E; co-creator of 'Mazing Man and Hero Hotline
- Greg Senat (born 1994), OL in the NFL
- Maju Varghese, attorney and director of the White House Military Office

== See also ==
- Floral Park Memorial High School
- H. Frank Carey Junior-Senior High School
- New Hyde Park Memorial High School
- Sewanhaka High School
