= Stewart Manor, New York =

- Village
- Incorporated Village of Stewart Manor
- Salisbury Avenue within Stewart Manor in 2026

- Location in Nassau County and the state of New York

- Location on Long Island Location within the state of New York
- Coordinates: 40°43′14″N 73°41′7″W
- Country: United States
- State: New York
- County: Nassau
- Town: Hempstead
- Incorporated: 1927
- Named for: Stewart Manor station; Alexander Turney Stewart

Government
  - Mayor: Michael Onorato
  - Trustees: Trustees' List: • Barbara Arciere; • William Grogan; • Peter Healy; • M. Carole Schafenberg

Area
  - Total: 0.20 sq mi (0.52 km^{2})
  - Land: 0.20 sq mi (0.52 km^{2})
  - Water: 0 sq mi (0.00 km^{2})
- Elevation: 85 ft (26 m)

Population (2020)
  - Total: 1,992
  - Density: 9,850.3/sq mi (3,803.21/km^{2})
- Time zone: UTC-5 (Eastern (EST))
  - Summer (DST): UTC-4 (EDT)
- ZIP code: 11530
- Area codes: 516, 363
- FIPS code: 36-71267
- GNIS feature ID: 0966409
- Website: stewartmanor.org

Stewart Manor (formerly known as Sunrise Gardens) is a village in the Town of Hempstead in Nassau County, on Long Island, in New York, United States. It is considered part of the Greater Garden City area, which is anchored by the Village of Garden City. The population was 1,992 at the time of the 2020 census.

== History ==
In 1925, a Brooklyn-based real estate development firm, Realty Associates, began developing a roughly 1.5-square-mile (3.9 km^{2}) area of land – including the majority of what is now the Village of Stewart Manor – as a suburban neighborhood near Garden City, naming this new community Sunrise Gardens. This large development – running east to the vicinity of Adams Street from Covert Avenue, and south to Cambridge Avenue from the Hempstead Branch of the Long Island Rail Road – would bear this name until 1926, when residents changed the name to Stewart Manor, after the nearby LIRR station; the Sunrise Gardens name had proven unpopular among residents, spurring the change.

Stewart Manor incorporated as a village on August 19, 1927, after the adjacent village, New Hyde Park, wished to annex the community into its boundaries – a move that was met with stiff opposition by residents of Stewart Manor and by Realty Associates, which in turn supported the residents to incorporate, so to gain home rule and allow the community to be able to better control the local infrastructure. In turn, the residents – led by resident and attorney Walter Rathborne – petitioned to incorporate, and the majority of residents participating in the vote voted in favor of becoming a village. Rathborne was ultimately elected as its first Mayor.

The Stewart Manor Municipal Building, which houses the village's government and contains its firehouse, was erected in 1936.

In 1943, due to World War II making it difficult to recruit new police officers, the Stewart Manor Police Department – the village's law enforcement agency – was dissolved and absorbed by the Nassau County Police Department, which as of 2026 continues to serve as the police agency responsible for law enforcement within the village.

In 1987, the Stewart Manor Municipal Building was expanded. It would subsequently be expanded again in 2002.

=== Etymology ===
The name reflects the community's proximity to the Stewart Manor station on the Long Island Rail Road in the adjacent village, Garden City, which is named after Alexander Turney Stewart.

== Geography ==
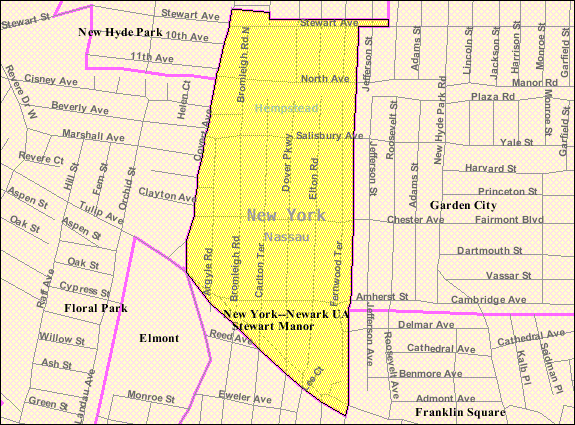
U.S. Census map of Stewart Manor

According to the United States Census Bureau, the village has a total area of 0.2 square miles (0.52 km^{2}), all land.

The village is east of the Village of Floral Park, south of the Village of New Hyde Park, and west of both Franklin Square and the Village of Garden City.

=== Drainage ===
The Village of Stewart Manor is located within the Hook Creek Watershed, which – in turn – is located within the larger Long Island Sound/Atlantic Ocean Watershed.

=== Climate ===
According to the Köppen climate classification, Stewart Manor has a Humid subtropical climate (type Cfa) with cool, wet winters and hot, humid summers. Precipitation is uniform throughout the year, with slight spring and fall peaks.

Climate data for Stewart Manor, New York, 1991–2020 normals, extremes 1999–present
Month	Jan	Feb	Mar	Apr	May	Jun	Jul	Aug	Sep	Oct	Nov	Dec	Year
Record high °F (°C)	71 (22)	73 (23)	85 (29)	94 (34)	97 (36)	103 (39)	105 (41)	104 (40)	100 (38)	90 (32)	83 (28)	76 (24)	105 (41)
Mean daily maximum °F (°C)	39 (4)	43 (6)	50 (10)	61 (16)	70 (21)	80 (27)	85 (29)	83 (28)	76 (24)	65 (18)	55 (13)	45 (7)	63 (17)
Mean daily minimum °F (°C)	26 (−3)	28 (−2)	34 (1)	42 (6)	51 (11)	61 (16)	66 (19)	65 (18)	58 (14)	48 (9)	40 (4)	31 (−1)	46 (8)
Record low °F (°C)	−10 (−23)	−7 (−22)	3 (−16)	13 (−11)	32 (0)	43 (6)	50 (10)	48 (9)	38 (3)	27 (−3)	10 (−12)	−1 (−18)	−10 (−23)
Average precipitation inches (mm)	3.62 (92)	3.17 (81)	4.35 (110)	4.15 (105)	3.90 (99)	3.85 (98)	4.40 (112)	3.72 (94)	3.91 (99)	4.08 (104)	3.73 (95)	3.82 (97)	46.7 (1,186)
Source: The Weather Channel

==== Plant zone ====
According to the United States Department of Agriculture (USDA), Stewart Manor is located within hardiness zone 7b.

== Demographics ==
Historical population
Census	Pop.	Note	%±
1930	1,291		—
1940	1,625		25.9%
1950	1,879		15.6%
1960	2,422		28.9%
1970	2,183		−9.9%
1980	2,373		8.7%
1990	2,002		−15.6%
2000	1,935		−3.3%
2010	1,896		−2.0%
2020	1,992		5.1%
U.S. Decennial Census

=== Racial and ethnic composition ===
Stewart Manor village, New York – Racial and ethnic composition Note: the US Census treats Hispanic/Latino as an ethnic category. This table excludes Latinos from the racial categories and assigns them to a separate category. Hispanics/Latinos may be of any race.
Race / Ethnicity (NH = Non-Hispanic)	Pop 2000	Pop 2010	Pop 2020	% 2000	% 2010	% 2020
White alone (NH)	1,765	1,646	1,480	91.21%	86.81%	74.30%
Black or African American alone (NH)	34	45	39	1.76%	2.37%	1.96%
Native American or Alaska Native alone (NH)	0	0	3	0.00%	0.00%	0.15%
Asian alone (NH)	37	91	149	1.91%	4.80%	7.48%
Native Hawaiian or Pacific Islander alone (NH)	0	0	0	0.00%	0.00%	0.00%
Other race alone (NH)	5	0	9	0.26%	0.00%	0.45%
Mixed race or Multiracial (NH)	16	20	56	0.83%	1.05%	2.81%
Hispanic or Latino (any race)	78	94	256	4.03%	4.96%	12.85%
Total	1,935	1,896	1,992	100.00%	100.00%	100.00%

=== 2020 census ===
At the 2020 census, there were 1,992 people residing in the village of Stewart Manor, with a population density of approximately 9,861.4 inhabitants per square mile (3,807.5/km^{2}). The racial makeup of the village was 77.1% White, 2.1% African American, 7.5% Asian, 4.1% from other races, and 8.9% from two or more races. Hispanic or Latino individuals of any race made up 12.9% of the population.

=== 2010 census ===
At the 2010 census, there were 1,896 people, 690 households, and 486 families in the village. The population density was 9,028.6 inhabitants per square mile (3,486.0/km^{2}). There were 711 housing units at an average density of 3,385.7 inhabitants per square mile (1,307.2/km^{2}). The racial makeup of the village was 87.2% White, 4.2% African American, 4.2% Asian, 1.7% from other races, and 2.0% from two or more races. Hispanic or Latino of any race were 6.7%.

=== 2000 census ===
At the 2000 census there were 1,935 people, 718 households, and 564 families in the village. The population density was 9,784.9 inhabitants per square mile (3,778.0/km^{2}). There were 726 housing units at an average density of 3,671.2 per square mile (1,417.5/km^{2}). The racial makeup of the village was 93.28% White, 1.76% African American, 1.91% Asian, 1.45% from other races, and 1.60% from two or more races. Hispanic or Latino of any race were 4.03%.

Of the 718 households 32.2% had children under the age of 18 living with them, 64.1% were married couples living together, 12.0% had a female householder with no husband present, and 21.4% were non-families. 19.4% of households were one person and 10.6% were one person aged 65 or older. The average household size was 2.69 and the average family size was 3.10.

The age distribution was 23.2% under the age of 18, 6.8% from 18 to 24, 28.6% from 25 to 44, 25.4% from 45 to 64, and 16.0% 65 or older. The median age was 40 years. For every 100 females, there were 84.8 males. For every 100 females age 18 and over, there were 81.6 males.

The median household income was $84,913 and the median family income was $97,922. Males had a median income of $67,031 versus $41,042 for females. The per capita income for the village was $35,371. About 1.9% of families and 2.6% of the population were below the poverty line, including 3.2% of those under age 18 and 3.9% of those age 65 or over.

== Government ==
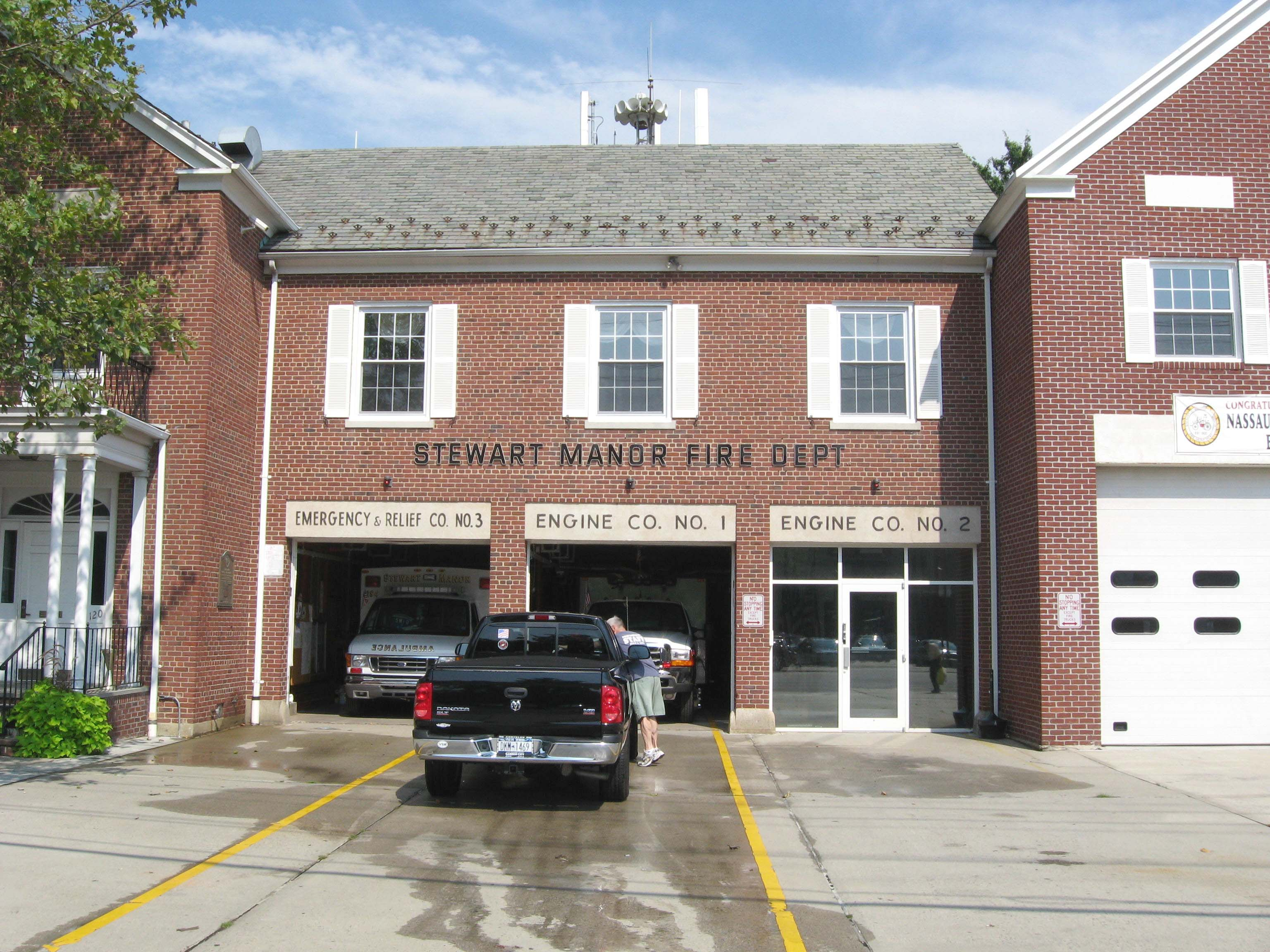
The Stewart Manor Municipal Building – housing the village's government – in 2008

The Village of Stewart Manor is governed by the Village of Stewart Manor Board of Trustees. This governing body consists of a mayor and four village trustees – all of whom are elected to serve four-year terms, during village elections held each March.

As of August 2025, the Mayor of Stewart Manor is Michael Onorato, and the Village Trustees are Barbara Arciere, William Grogan, Peter Healy, and M. Carole Schafenberg.

=== Politics ===
In the 2024 United States presidential election, the majority of Stewart Manor voters voted for Donald Trump (R), who carried the vote in all three election districts covering the village.

== Education ==
=== School districts ===
Stewart Manor is located primarily within the boundaries of the Elmont Union Free School District (K-6) and the Sewanhaka Central High School District (7–12), although one street in the village – Fernwood Terrace – is split between Garden City Union Free School District, as well as the Franklin Square UFSD (the latter of which feeds into the Sewanhaka CHSD). Accordingly, children who reside within the village and attend public schools go to school in one of these districts.

Additionally, the Elmont Union Free School District's Stewart Manor Elementary School is located within the village.

=== Library districts ===
Stewart Manor is served by the Elmont, Franklin Square, and Garden City Library Districts. The boundaries of these three library districts roughly correspond with those of the school districts.

== Notable people ==
- Thomas Mallon – Novelist, essayist, and critic.
- Sal Paolantonio – Philadelphia-based bureau reporter for ESPN, who primarily reports on NFL stories.

== See also ==
- List of municipalities in New York
- Floral Park, New York
