= H. Frank Carey Junior-Senior High School =

H. Frank Carey High School

Location
- 230 Poppy Ave; Franklin Square, New York 11010; United States; 40°42′51″N 73°40′06″W

Information
- Type: Public
- Established: 1956
- School district: Sewanhaka Central High School District
- NCES School ID: 362652003628
- Principal: Jennifer Alaimo
- Teaching staff: 112.32 (on an FTE basis)
- Grades: 7-12
- Enrollment: 1,594 (2023-2024)
- Student to teacher ratio: 14.19
- Campus: Suburban: Large
- Colors: Black and Orange
- Mascot: Seahawks
- Newspaper: The Clipper
- Yearbook: LOG
- Website: www.sewanhakaschools.org/o/hfc

H. Frank Carey High School is a public high school located in Franklin Square, New York serving students in the seventh through twelfth grades from the communities of Franklin Square, Garden City South, Garden City, West Hempstead, and Elmont.

== History ==
H. Frank Carey High School was constructed in 1956 in the Long Island hamlet of Franklin Square. The school was named after then-Board of Education President, Harley Frank Carey. During the 1999-2000 academic year, H. Frank Carey High School was recognized as a National School of Excellence.

== Athletics ==
The following sports are offered at Carey:

- Boys Baseball
- Basketball Girls And Boys
- Coed Cross country
- Girls Field hockey
- Boys Football
- Lacrosse Boys and Girls
- Riffling
- Soccer Boys and Girls
- Girls Softball
- Coed Swimming
- Tennis Boys and Girls
- Coed Track-winter and spring
- Volleyball Boys and Girls
- Wrestling Boys And Girls

== Notable alumni ==
- Bruce Arena, coach of the United States men's national soccer team, 1969
- Richie Cannata, Musician, 1967
- Ira Flatow, radio personality, 1967
- Randy Gordon, NY State Boxing Commissioner; Inductee to the International Boxing Hall of Fame, 2025; Author, Radio Personality, 1967
- Michael J. Massimino, NASA astronaut, 1980
- Shane Pinto, professional ice hockey player for the Ottawa Senators
- Mike Tucci, actor, 1964
- Al Trautwig, broadcaster, 1974

== See also ==
- Elmont Memorial High School
- Floral Park Memorial High School
- New Hyde Park Memorial High School
- Sewanhaka High School
