= New Hyde Park Memorial High School =

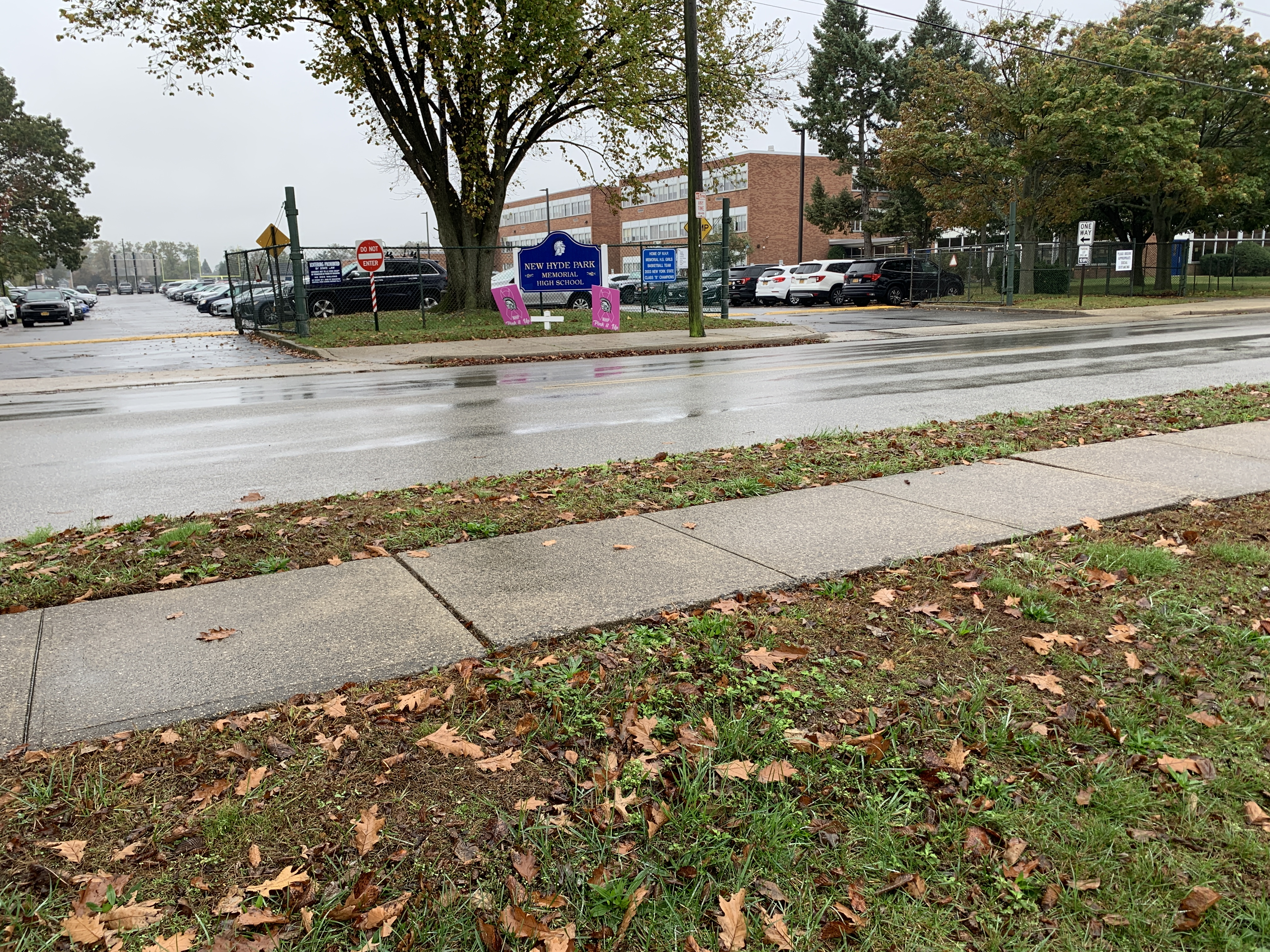
- New Hyde Park Memorial High School in 2020

Location
- 500 Leonard Boulevard; New Hyde Park, NY 11040; United States; 40°44′30.8″N 73°40′33.91″W

Information
- Type: Comprehensive school
- Established: 1956
- School district: Sewanhaka Central High School District
- Principal: Rosemary DeGennaro
- Teaching staff: 126.02 FTEs
- Grades: 7–12
- Enrollment: 1,738 (2023–2024)
- Student to teacher ratio: 13.79
- Colors: Blue and White
- Nickname: Gladiators
- Newspaper: The Chariot
- Website: www.sewanhakaschools.org/o/nhp

New Hyde Park Memorial High School is a six-year public high school in North New Hyde Park, New York, as part of the Sewanhaka Central High School District. Like the four other high schools in the district, the school is home to grades 7 through 12, a combined junior and senior high school.

As of the 2016–2017 school year, the school had an enrollment of 1,756 students and 119.47 classroom teachers (on an FTE basis), for a student-teacher ratio of 14.7:1. There were 307 students (17.48% of enrollment) eligible for free lunch and 45 (2.56%) eligible for reduced-cost lunch. In terms of racial ethnicity, 36% were White, 43% were Asian, 16% were Hispanic, and 4% were Black.

The school held its 50th Anniversary Celebration on Sunday, June 4, 2006. The principal is currently Ms. Rosemary DeGennaro. The school mascot is the Gladiator, and its colors are blue and white.

== Awards and recognition ==
In recognition of being ranked #2,309 in U.S. News & World Report’s National Rankings for 2024, New Hyde Park Memorial High School earned eligibility to display a U.S. News Best High School Award Badge.

During the 1992-93 school year, New Hyde Park Memorial High School was recognized with the Blue Ribbon School Award of Excellence by the United States Department of Education, the highest award an American school can receive.

== Controversies ==
In 2000, former Coach Daniel Marino was designated a sex offender and received three years probation for having sexual relations with a 16-year-old student.

In 2024, a teacher was terminated from his position after allegedly forcibly tying a student with autism to a chair with a rope.

== Curriculum ==
The school has classes in various areas of music, art, English, science, technology, business, math, science, social studies, and foreign languages including French, Italian, and Spanish at various levels. The school also has various special education and advanced education programs, including AP courses. The advanced, or honors level system works so that students may be on year ahead of the curriculum for the Regents level for that grade.

This school offers the following Advanced Placement classes: World History, U.S. History, Government, European History, Human Geography, Computer Science, Psychology, English Language and Comprehension, English Literature and Comprehension, Calculus AB, Calculus BC, Biology, Chemistry, Spanish, Italian, Statistics, Studio Art and 2-Dimensional Design.

== Extracurricular activities ==
There are various clubs and sports in the school. Sports run from September to June and there are many options. The school is known for its girls Basketball team that won the Class B New York State Championship in the 2002/2003 season (Lisa Karcic and others). The Girls Varsity Tennis Team was undefeated in 2005/2006 and 2010/2011 and won the Division and Conference for both.

During the 1977, 1983 seasons as well as the 1993 season the Gladiators varsity football team went undefeated. The 1977 team earned the number 2 ranking in New York State and won the Rutgers Cup which, at the time, was given to the top HS Football Team in Nassau County and in 1993 the Gladiators won the Long Island championship.

During the 2002/2003 season, the varsity men's soccer team, under coach Vincent Scott, qualified for the playoffs. During the first round, the team was forced to miss their own homecoming for their opening round game against Bellmore/JFK, where they prevailed 1-0 on an Andrew Neil Simms "missile" just outside the 18 yard box, but fell in the second round.

The Boys Varsity Tennis Team was undefeated in 2008/2009 and won the Division and Conference, 14-0. They then went on to 1st place, in a higher division, during the 2009/2010 season, 13-3.

Clubs include: Future Business Leaders of America, The School Musical, Drama Club, Stage Crew, Model United Nations (which has had success at conferences such as Harvard, Yale, New York, William and Mary, Rutgers, Chicago, etc.), Key Club, Builders Club, Red Cross, Service League, Science Olympiad Club, Seekers Christian Club, French Club, Spanish Club, Italian Club, Samarateens, The Chariot (school newspaper) see the website nhpchariotpaper.com, The Lance (school yearbook), The Arena (school literary arts magazine), Chamber Singers, Jazz Band, Pit Band, String Ensemble, Jr. and Sr. High Mathletes (which has had success at local competitions), Jr. and Sr. High Science Research (successful at competitions such as NYSSEF and LISEC), Artisans, Airbrush, and ICC (International Culture Club).

Various performing groups include those at pep rallies, sporting events, and Homecoming. They consist of the Step Team, Romanettes (kick-line), The Twirlers and Junior High, JV, and V Cheerleaders.

== See also ==
- Elmont Memorial High School
- Floral Park Memorial High School
- H. Frank Carey Junior-Senior High School
- Sewanhaka High School
