= Susan Prescott =

American business executive

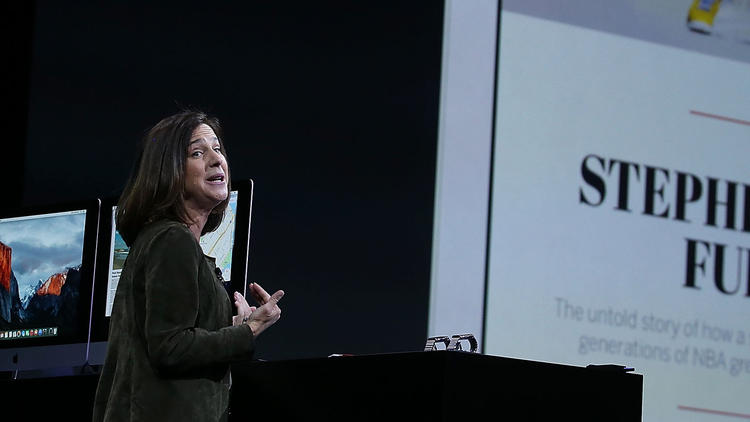
- Prescott presenting at the WWDC 2015 keynote
- Born: Susan Prescott; New York City, New York, U.S.

Susan Prescott is an American business executive. Prescott is the Vice President of Enterprise and Education Marketing at Apple, Inc. She has worked at Apple since departing Adobe Systems on March 3, 2003.

== Biography ==
Prescott was born and raised in New York City. She was a student at Sewanhaka High School in Floral Park, NY. Prescott earned a bachelor's degree in systems engineering from the University of Pennsylvania in 1986 and a master's degree in computer science from Stanford University in 1988.

Prescott demoed Apple News at WWDC 2015.

At some point after 2015, her job title changed from Vice President of Application and Product Management to Vice President of Worldwide Developer Relations. In late 2021, Prescott's title was listed as Vice President of Enterprise and Education Marketing.

Prescott talked about new developer tools and APIs in the new versions of iOS, iPadOS, and macOS at WWDC21 and WWDC22.

== Philanthropy ==
Prescott was formerly the Chairman of United Way Silicon Valley, and continues to do philanthropic work. She announced her plan to develop a partnership between the United Way and the community to promote education, adult living skills and health within the community.
