= South Floral Park, New York =

South Floral Park, New York Jamaica Square
- Village
- Incorporated Village of South Floral Park
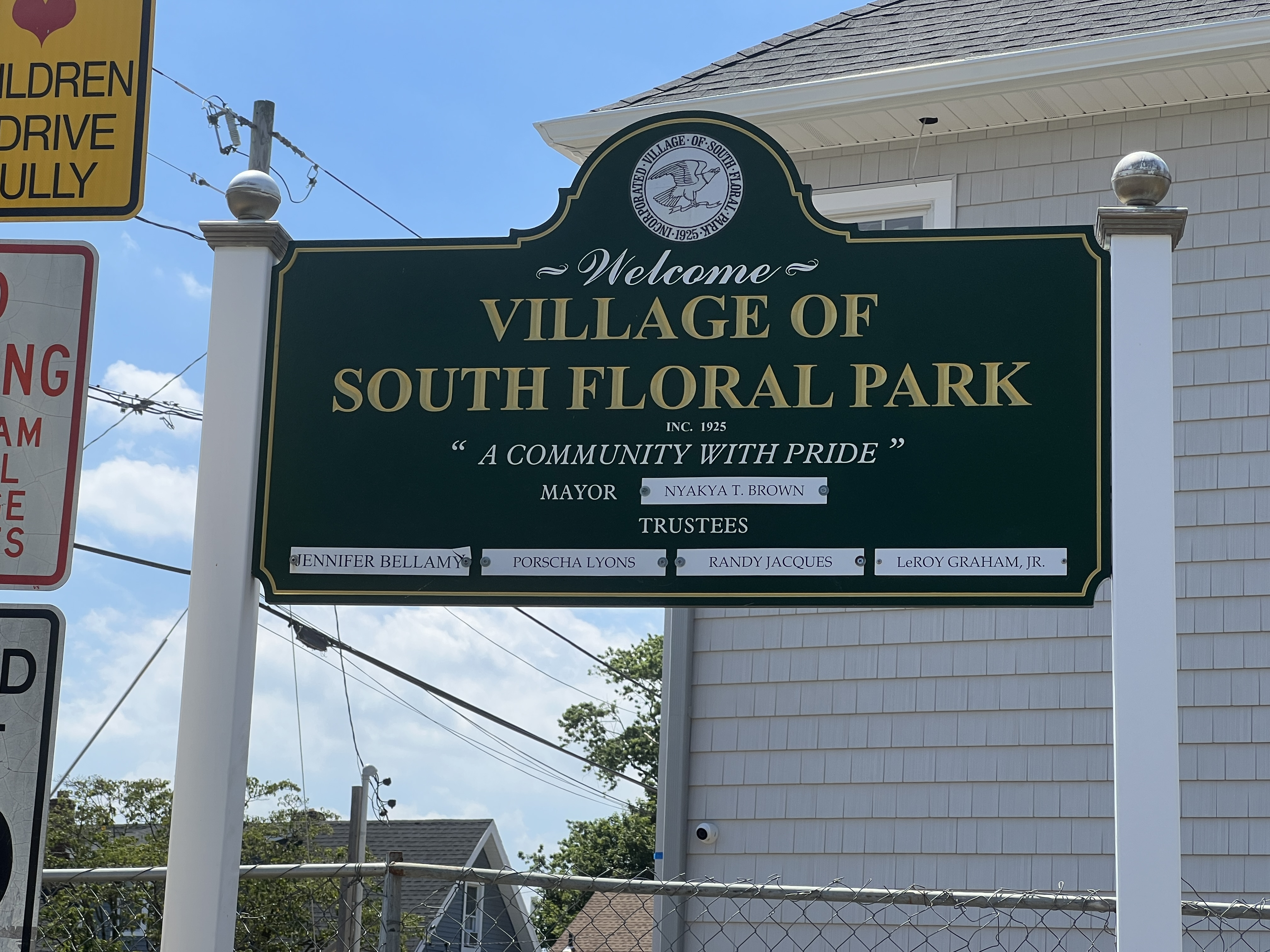
- A South Floral Park entrance sign in 2022
- Nickname: SFP
- Motto: "Where Families Flourish and Futures Shine!"
- Location in Nassau County and the state of New York

- Location on Long Island Location within the state of New York
- Coordinates: 40°42′47″N 73°42′2″W
- Country: United States
- State: New York
- County: Nassau
- Town: Hempstead
- Incorporated: November 1925
- Named for: Its location south of Floral Park

Government
  - Mayor: Porscha Lyons
  - Deputy Mayor: Jennifer Bellamy

Area
  - Total: 0.097 sq mi (0.25 km^{2})
  - Land: 0.097 sq mi (0.25 km^{2})
  - Water: 0 sq mi (0.00 km^{2})
- Elevation: 69 ft (21 m)

Population (2020)
  - Total: 1,741
  - Density: 17,899.1/sq mi (6,910.87/km^{2})
- Time zone: UTC-5 (Eastern (EST))
  - Summer (DST): UTC-4 (EDT)
- ZIP code: 11001
- Area codes: 516, 363
- FIPS code: 36-69023
- GNIS feature ID: 0965746
- Website: www.southfloralpark.org

South Floral Park (formerly known as Jamaica Square) is a village within the Town of Hempstead in Nassau County, on Long Island, in New York, United States. The population was 1,741 at the time of the 2020 census.

At 0.096 square miles (0.25 km^{2}), the Incorporated Village of South Floral Park is the smallest village in the State of New York by total area.

== History ==
The Village of South Floral Park was incorporated in November 1925 as the Village of Jamaica Square. This name had been used since the area was first developed circa 1905; the name was originally chosen so as to reflect the fact that it was down the road from Jamaica, Queens and next to Franklin Square. However its name was changed to South Floral Park in 1931 due to confusion with said neighborhood in Queens; the new name was chosen based on the fact that the village is located immediately south of and adjacent to Floral Park.

Residents decided to incorporate their community because they felt that the Town of Hempstead was unable to adequately fulfill the needs of their community, and believed that a more localized government would be able to govern it better.

In 1953, South Floral Park Village Hall was constructed. The building was expanded in 1984 to rehouse the village's fire department in a more modern and efficient facility, which was dedicated on October 19, 1986.

South Floral Park was one of the earliest racially integrated villages on Long Island.

== Geography ==
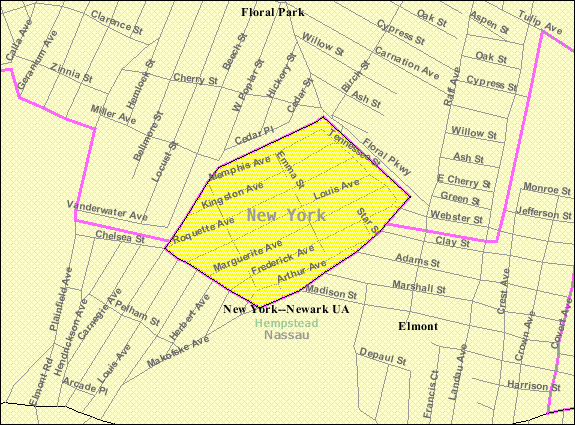
U.S. Census map of South Floral Park

According to the United States Census Bureau, the village has a total area of 0.096 square miles (0.25 km^{2}), all land.

South Floral Park is the smallest village in the State of New York by total area.

=== Climate ===
The Village of South Floral Park features a humid subtropical climate (Cfa) under the Köppen climate classification. As such, the village experiences hot, humid summers and cold winters, and experiences precipitation throughout the entirety of the year.

Climate data for South Floral Park, New York, 1991–2020 normals, extremes 1999–present
Month	Jan	Feb	Mar	Apr	May	Jun	Jul	Aug	Sep	Oct	Nov	Dec	Year
Record high °F (°C)	71 (22)	73 (23)	85 (29)	94 (34)	97 (36)	103 (39)	105 (41)	104 (40)	100 (38)	90 (32)	83 (28)	76 (24)	105 (41)
Mean daily maximum °F (°C)	39 (4)	43 (6)	50 (10)	61 (16)	70 (21)	80 (27)	85 (29)	83 (28)	76 (24)	65 (18)	55 (13)	45 (7)	63 (17)
Mean daily minimum °F (°C)	26 (−3)	28 (−2)	34 (1)	42 (6)	51 (11)	61 (16)	66 (19)	65 (18)	58 (14)	48 (9)	40 (4)	31 (−1)	46 (8)
Record low °F (°C)	−10 (−23)	−7 (−22)	3 (−16)	13 (−11)	32 (0)	43 (6)	50 (10)	48 (9)	38 (3)	27 (−3)	10 (−12)	−1 (−18)	−10 (−23)
Average precipitation inches (mm)	3.62 (92)	3.17 (81)	4.35 (110)	4.15 (105)	3.90 (99)	3.85 (98)	4.40 (112)	3.72 (94)	3.91 (99)	4.08 (104)	3.73 (95)	3.82 (97)	46.7 (1,186)
Source: The Weather Channel

==== Plant zone ====
According to the United States Department of Agriculture (USDA), South Floral Park is located within hardiness zone 7b.

== Economy ==
The Village of South Floral Park is considered to be a bedroom community of the City of New York.

The village itself is residential in character, consisting of a single residential zoning district which covers South Floral Park in its entirety. As such, there are no areas zoned for commercial or industrial uses anywhere within South Floral Park. Despite this, there have historically been a couple of formal businesses which operated within the village – including a deli.

The majority of lots in the village consist of single-family residential homes, with the only major exceptions being the village hall and fire station complex and a church.

== Demographics ==
Historical population
Census	Pop.	Note	%±
1930	460		—
1940	510		10.9%
1950	572		12.2%
1960	1,090		90.6%
1970	1,032		−5.3%
1980	1,490		44.4%
1990	1,478		−0.8%
2000	1,578		6.8%
2010	1,764		11.8%
2020	1,741		−1.3%
U.S. Decennial Census; 2010 2020

=== Racial and ethnic composition ===
South Floral Park village, New York – Racial and ethnic composition Note: the US Census treats Hispanic/Latino as an ethnic category. This table excludes Latinos from the racial categories and assigns them to a separate category. Hispanics/Latinos may be of any race.
Race / Ethnicity (NH = Non-Hispanic)	Pop 2000	Pop 2010	Pop 2020	% 2000	% 2010	% 2020
White alone (NH)	257	245	158	16.29%	13.89%	9.08%
Black or African American alone (NH)	913	971	834	57.86%	55.05%	47.90%
Native American or Alaska Native alone (NH)	4	10	8	0.25%	0.57%	0.46%
Asian alone (NH)	59	137	240	3.74%	7.77%	13.79%
Native Hawaiian or Pacific Islander alone (NH)	0	0	0	0.00%	0.00%	0.00%
Other race alone (NH)	13	20	27	0.82%	1.13%	1.55%
Mixed race or Multiracial (NH)	118	65	90	7.48%	3.68%	5.17%
Hispanic or Latino (any race)	214	316	384	13.56%	17.91%	22.06%
Total	1,578	1,764	1,741	100.00%	100.00%	100.00%

=== 2000 Census ===
At the 2000 census there were 1,578 people, 456 households, and 383 families in the village. The population density was 15,776.3 inhabitants per square mile (6,091.3/km^{2}). There were 462 housing units at an average density of 4,618.9 per square mile (1,783.4/km^{2}). The racial makeup of the village was 22.18% White, 59.06% African American, 0.25% Native American, 3.80% Asian, 6.15% from other races, and 8.56% from two or more races. Hispanic or Latino of any race were 13.56%.

Of the 456 households 35.3% had children under the age of 18 living with them, 54.8% were married couples living together, 22.1% had a female householder with no husband present, and 16.0% were non-families. 12.3% of households were one person and 5.9% were one person aged 65 or older. The average household size was 3.46 and the average family size was 3.72.

The age distribution was 26.7% under the age of 18, 7.9% from 18 to 24, 28.5% from 25 to 44, 25.0% from 45 to 64, and 11.9% 65 or older. The median age was 36 years. For every 100 females, there were 97.0 males. For every 100 females age 18 and over, there were 87.8 males.

The median household income was $64,205 and the median family income was $68,000. Males had a median income of $36,250 versus $37,292 for females. The per capita income for the village was $21,091. About 0.8% of families and 2.8% of the population were below the poverty line, including none of those under age 18 and 6.3% of those age 65 or over.

== Government ==
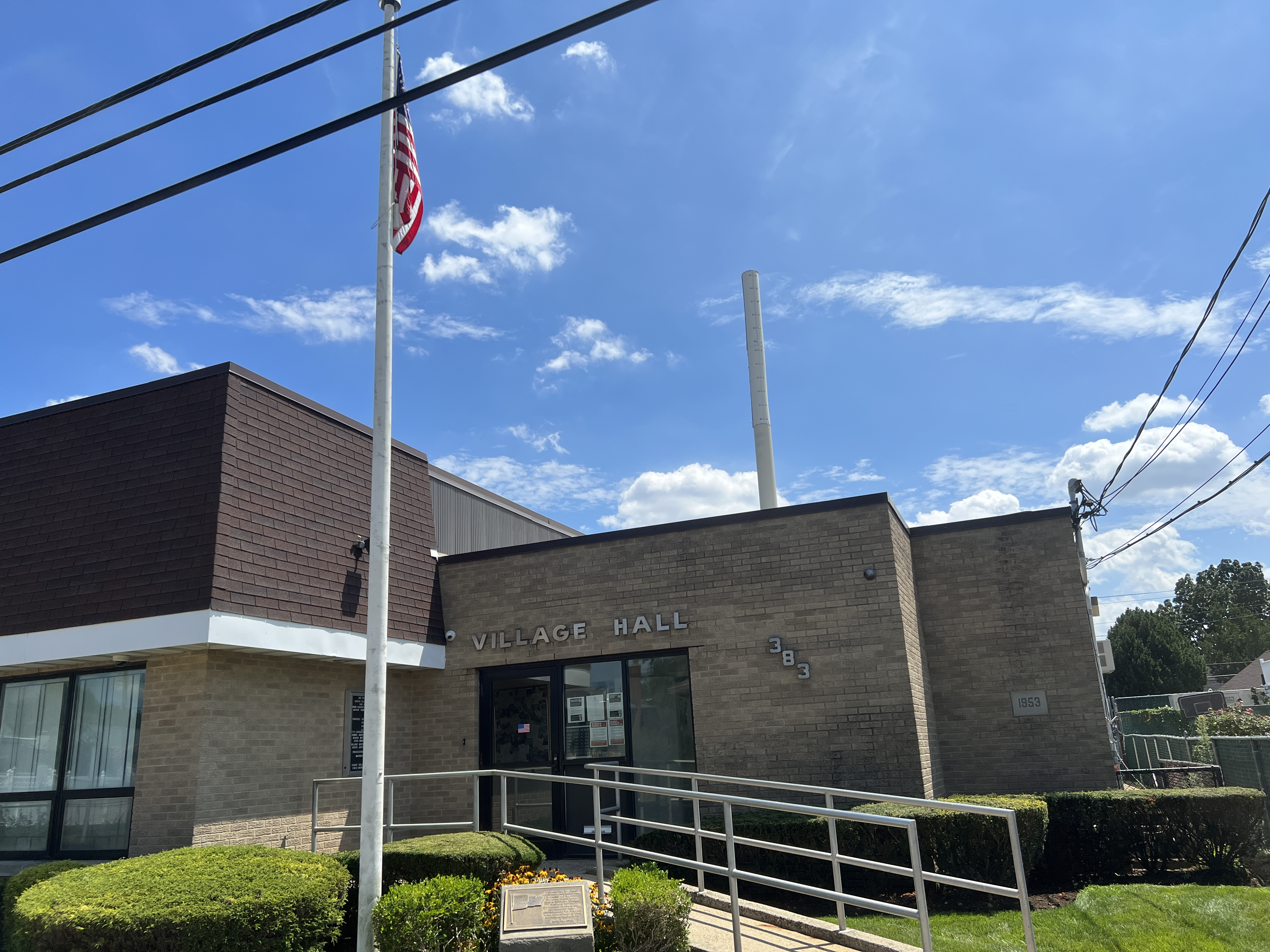
South Floral Park Village Hall in 2022

As of June 2026, the Mayor of South Floral Park is Porscha Lyons, the Deputy Mayor is Jennifer Bellamy, and the Village Trustees are Jennifer Bellamy, LeRoy Graham Jr., Randy Jaques, and Virginia Salvatore. All elected officials on the Board of Trustees serve four-year terms.

The South Floral Park Village Hall is located in the heart of the village, at 383 Roquette Ave.

The following is a list of South Floral Park's mayors, from 1925 to present:

Mayors of South Floral Park
Mayor's name	Year(s) in office
William J. Ruppert	1925–1933
William Hand	1933–1939
William Sweeney	1939–1942
Barney Strup	1942–1966
William J. Hoffman	1966–1971
James Lorenzo	1971–1990
Arlene McMullen	1990–2002
Angel Soto	2002–2010
Geoffrey N. Prime	2010–2022
Nyakya T. Brown	2022–2026
Porscha Lyons	2026–Present

== Parks and recreation ==
The Village of South Floral Park owns and maintains a small park, known as Firemen's Memorial Park, which was dedicated in 1974. Located off Arthur Avenue, the park contains a historic bell dating to 1875, which was formerly utilized in alerting the community's volunteer firefighters; the bell was installed at the park in 1973.

== Education ==
South Floral Park, in its entirety, is located within the boundaries of (and is thus served by) the Elmont Union Free School District for elementary education and the Sewanhaka Central High School District for secondary education. Accordingly, all children who reside within the village and attend public schools go to school in one of these two districts, depending on what grade they are in.

== Infrastructure ==
=== Transportation ===
==== Road ====
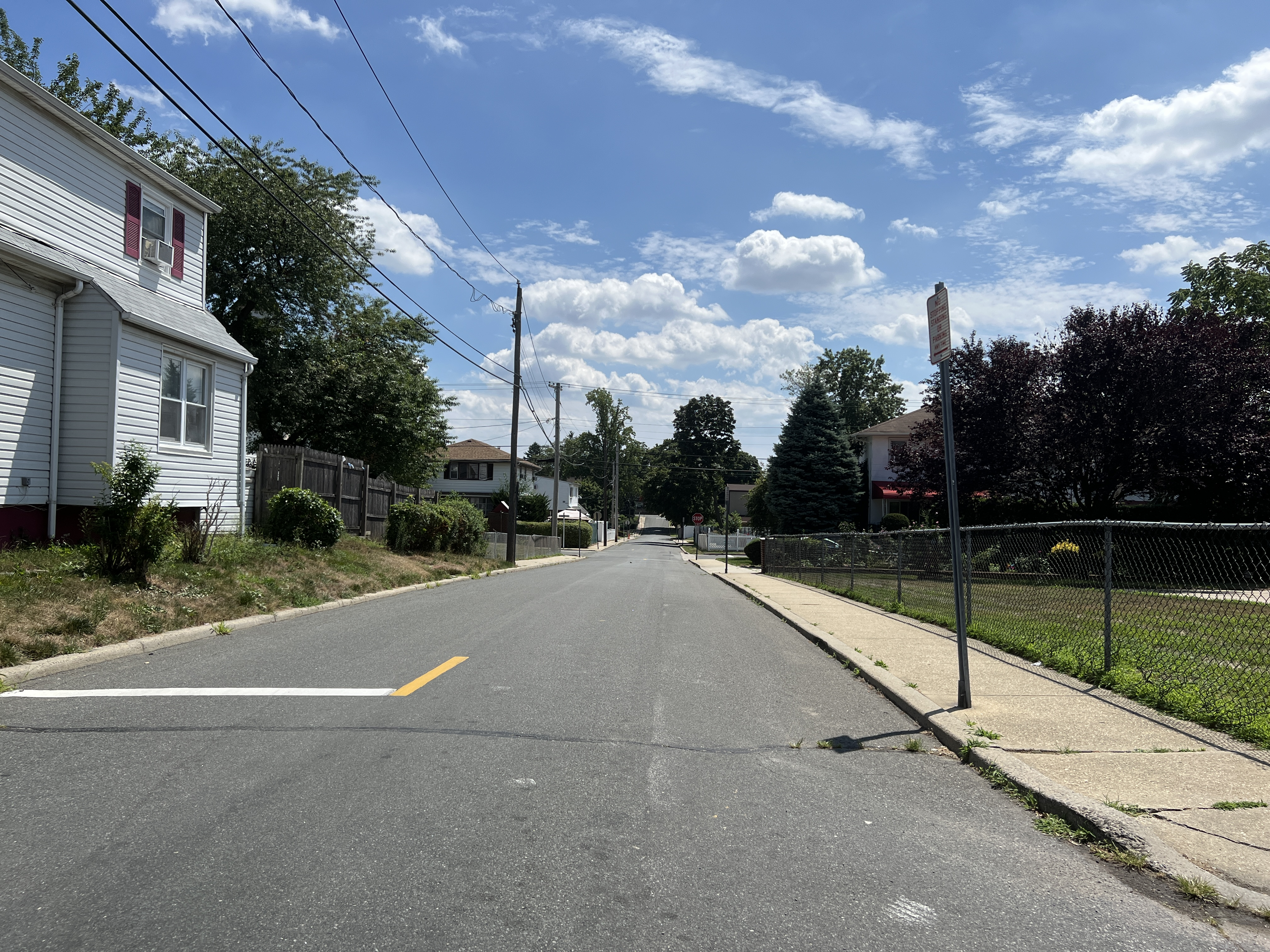
Bertha Street in South Floral Park in 2022

All roads within South Floral Park are owned and maintained by the village.

Major roads either partially or wholly within the village include Arthur Avenue, Roquette Avenue, and Tennessee Street.

=== Utilities ===
==== Natural gas ====
National Grid USA provides natural gas to properties in South Floral Park that are hooked up to natural gas lines.

==== Power ====
PSEG Long Island provides power to all homes and businesses within South Floral Park, on behalf of the Long Island Power Authority.

==== Sewage ====
South Floral Park, in its entirety, is served by the Nassau County Sewage District's sanitary sewer network.

==== Trash collection ====
Trash collection services in South Floral Park are provided by the Town of Hempstead's Sanitation District 6.

==== Water ====
The water supply in South Floral Park is provided by the Water Authority of Western Nassau County.

=== Emergency services ===
==== Fire ====
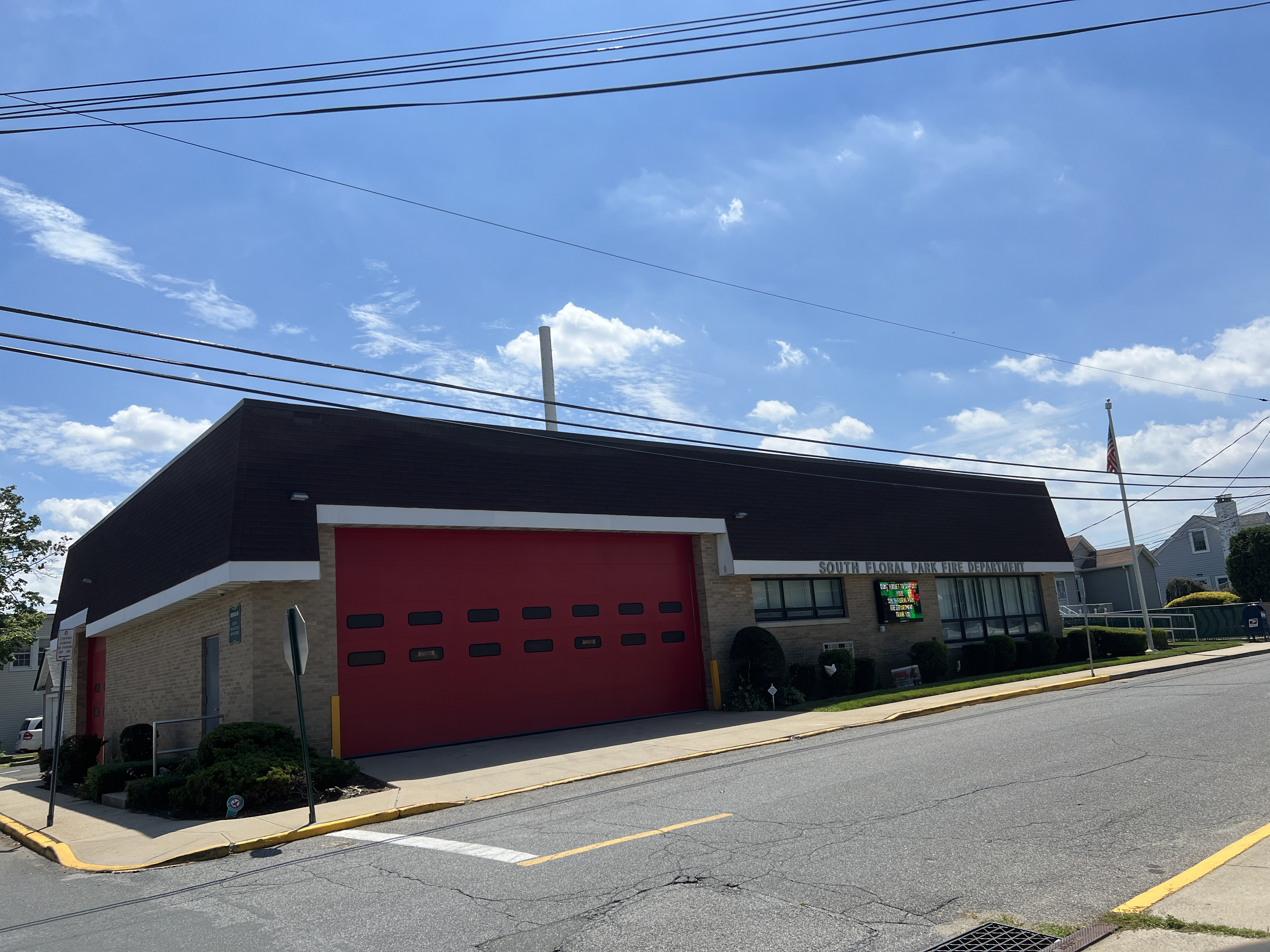
The South Floral Park Fire Station in 2022

The Village of South Floral Park operates its own municipal fire department, known as the South Floral Park Fire Department. This department provides the entirety of the village with fire protection.

==== Police ====
Police protection in South Floral Park is provided by the Nassau County Police Department.

== See also ==
- List of municipalities in New York
- Floral Park, New York
- Floral Park Centre, New York
