= East Garden City, New York =

- Hamlet and former census-designated place
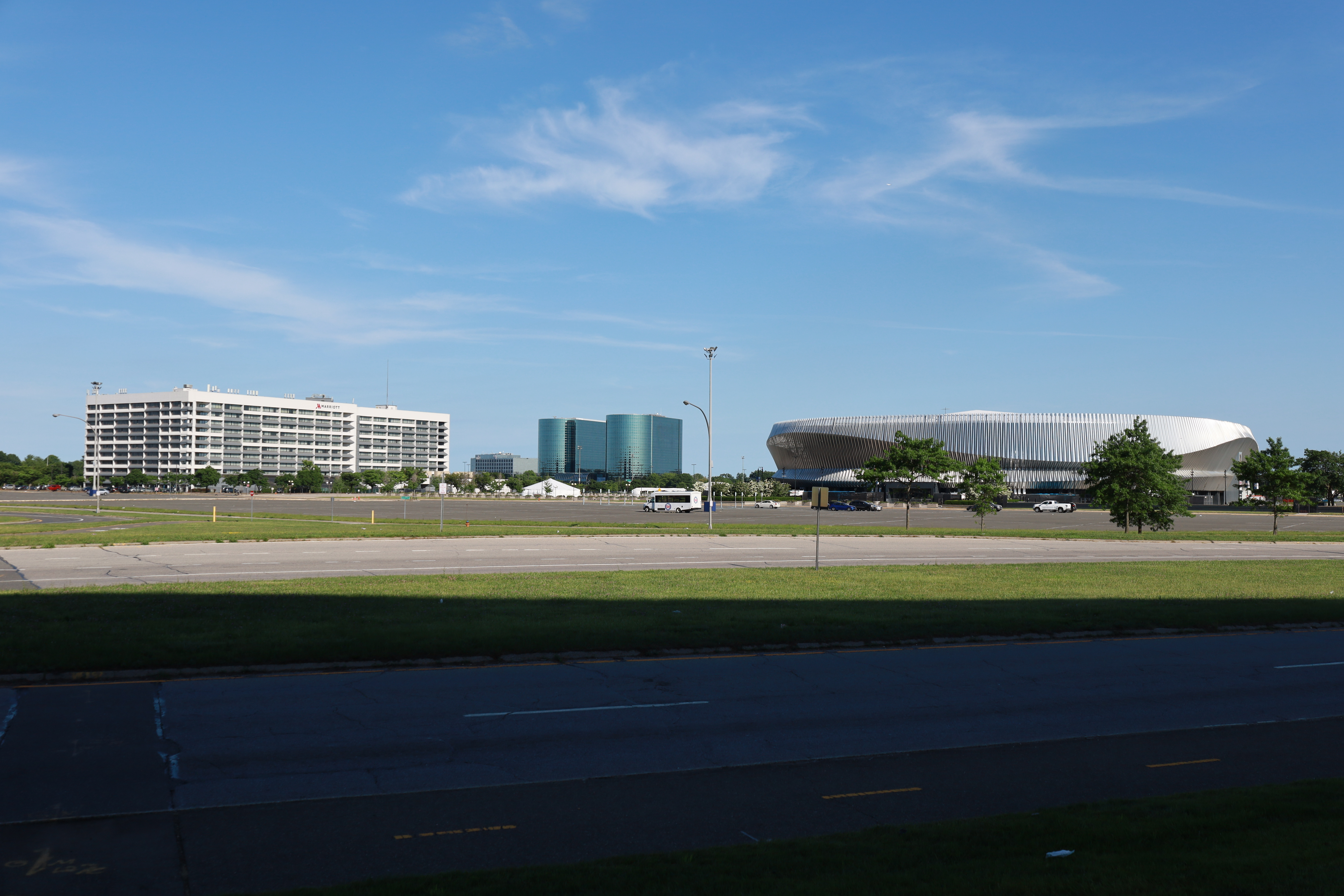
- The skyline of the Nassau Hub in 2021
- Nickname: Nassau Hub
- Location in Nassau County and the state of New York

- Location on Long Island Location within the state of New York
- Coordinates: 40°43′51″N 73°35′53″W
- Country: United States
- State: New York
- County: Nassau
- Town: Hempstead
- Named for: Its location east of Garden City

Area
  - Total: 3.0 sq mi (7.8 km^{2})
  - Land: 3.0 sq mi (7.8 km^{2})
  - Water: 0 sq mi (0.0 km^{2})
- Elevation: 95 ft (29 m)
- Time zone: UTC-5 (Eastern (EST))
  - Summer (DST): UTC-4 (EDT)
- Zip Codes: 11530, 11550, 11553, 11590
- Area codes: 516, 363
- FIPS code: 36-22065
- GNIS feature ID: 1852898

East Garden City (also known as the Nassau Hub) is a hamlet and former census-designated place (CDP), located within the CDP of Uniondale, in the northeastern part of the Town of Hempstead, in the Hempstead Plains region of Nassau County, on Long Island, in New York, United States, along the Hempstead/North Hempstead town line. The population was 6,208 at the time of the 2010 census, when it was still listed as a CDP.

The hamlet is mostly a commercial and industrial area, and it also includes Nassau Community College – along with the majority of Hofstra University's northern campus.

== Geography ==
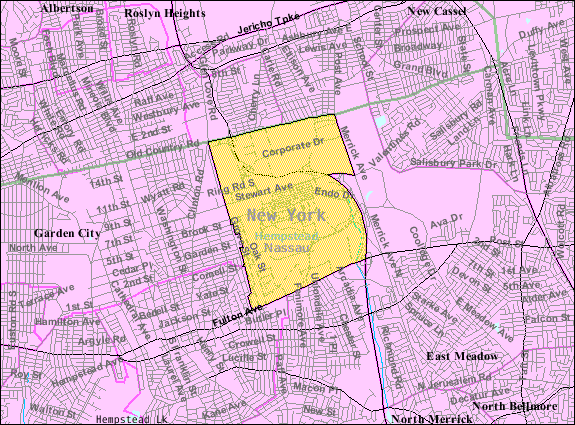
U.S. Census map of East Garden City

According to the United States Census Bureau, the CDP had a total area of 3.0 square miles (7.8 km^{2}), all land.

Beginning on its northern border and proceeding clockwise, East Garden City was bordered on the north by Carle Place and the Village of Westbury in the Town of North Hempstead (the Hempstead/North Hempstead town line); on the east by East Meadow; on the south by Uniondale and the Village of Hempstead; and, on the west by the Villages of Hempstead and Garden City.

East Garden City is one of many areas on Long Island where none of the places in the community have the hamlet name as part of their mailing address: places in East Garden City have either a "Garden City, NY 11530", a "Westbury, NY 11590", a "Uniondale, NY 11553" or a "Hempstead, NY 11550" mailing address.

== Demographics ==
As of the census of 2010, there were 6,208 people living in the then-CDP. There were 1,341 housing units. The racial makeup of the CDP was 67.3% Non-Hispanic White, 16.7% African American, 0.1% Native American, 4.4% Asian, 0.0% Pacific Islander, 9.0% Hispanic, and 3.0% from two or more races.

== Controversy & absorption ==
In 2015, there were disputes between Uniondale and East Garden City about the latter's existence as a Census-designated place.

According to the Long Island Press, "They [civic leaders from Uniondale] argue that planners and developers concocted the name to distance prime real estate north of Hempstead Turnpike from the racially diverse neighborhood on the south side. Lawmakers back Uniondale’s cause, but wiping East Garden City off the map is easier said than done. At stake is what to call the heart of the area also known as the Nassau Hub—home to almost half the county’s economic activity and Nassau Veterans Memorial Coliseum."

Newsday later notes, "In May [2015], the controversy led to a meeting involving then-Town Supervisor Kate Murray, Rep. Kathleen Rice (D-Garden City) and federal census officials, who, while agreeing to drop the name, indicated it might take 18 months to become official."

== In popular culture ==
East Garden City has been the filming location for – or otherwise been the setting for scenes in – various films. Some of the scenes in The Spirit of St. Louis (1957) were set at Roosevelt Field, located within the hamlet. A film studio located on the former airport's grounds was later used as the production location for Santa Claus Conquers the Martians (1964).

Additionally, scenes for The Godfather (1972) were filmed on the campus of Nassau Community Colleges, utilizing the Mitchel Air Force Base's former runways.

== See also ==
- Garden City South, New York
- Garden City Park, New York
