= Sewanhaka High School =

- Sewanhaka High School in 2026

Location
- 500 Tulip Avenue; Floral Park, New York 11001; United States; 40°43′04″N 73°41′23″W

Information
- Type: Public high school
- Established: 1929
- NCES School ID: 3626520
- Principal: John Kenny
- Faculty: 119.1 FTEs
- Grades: 7–12
- Enrollment: 1,669 (as of 2018–19)
- Student to teacher ratio: 14.0:1
- Colors: Purple, Gold, and White
- Mascot: Indians (1929—2024); Ravens (2024—present)
- Newspaper: The Raven’s Quill
- Yearbook: Totem
- Website: https://www.sewanhakaschools.org/o/shs

Sewanhaka High School is a six-year public high school located within Elmont and Floral Park, in Nassau County, New York, United States. It is part of the Sewanhaka Central High School District. Sewanhaka High School was established in 1929. Its name translates from Lenape to "Island of Shells" in English.

As of the 2018–19 school year, the school had an enrollment of 1,669 students and 119.1 classroom teachers (on an FTE basis), for a student–teacher ratio of 14.0:1. There were 675 students (40.4% of enrollment) eligible for free lunch and 118 (7.1% of students) eligible for reduced-cost lunch.

== History ==
Sewanhaka High School was constructed in 1929 by architects Knappe & Morris. Additional classrooms were completed in 1936. The school was established first in the district. Other schools in the Sewanhaka district were founded to accommodate for the growing population from the baby boom.

It is the only high school in its district to offer career vocational courses on Long Island. Those eligible to join this program include students from the other four high schools in the district.

== Awards and recognition ==
During the 1992–93 school year, Sewanhaka High School was recognized with the Blue Ribbon School Award of Excellence by the United States Department of Education, the highest award an American school can receive.

== Sports and clubs ==
Sewanhaka's sports teams were originally known as the Indians from the school's founding in 1929. The school was forced to change the name following a 2023 decision by the New York State Board of Regents to ban Native American-themed team names, mascots, and logos. After a selection process by a committee including students, faculty, and alumni, "Ravens" was announced as the new team name at a Board of Education meeting on May 28, 2024.

The team colors are purple, gold, and white. There are many team sports, organized clubs, and student activities at Sewanhaka. The Sports Team levels are Junior High (JH), Junior Varsity (JV) and Varsity (V) for boys and girls. The sports and clubs that the school offers at this moment are:

- Basketball
- Baseball
- Bowling
- Badminton
- Cheerleading
- Cross Country
- Football
- Field Hockey
- Golf
- Gymnastics
- Lacrosse
- Riflery
- Soccer
- Softball
- Tennis
- Track
- Volleyball

=== Model UN ===
The Model United Nations Debate Team at Sewanhaka starts with participation in the 1/2 credit World Issues class, and then upon completion, the students become members of the club. The team goes on many conferences where they debate a wide variety of issues facing the real United Nations today. At the 2009 American University Model United Conference, the Sewanhaka team took home Overall Best Delegation, the prestigious first place award on the international scale. Two members of the team took home the distinguished delegation award in November 2011, continuing the team's success from the previous two years (members of the class of 2010). Recently, Senator Jack M. Martins congratulated the Model UN team from Sewanhaka High School. The team participated in the Sewanhaka Interschool District Model UN competition. More recently, in 2016, the team took home the trophy for Outstanding Small Delegation from the Rutgers University Model United Nations (RUMUN) conference.

=== The Raven’s Quill/The Chieftain ===
The school newspaper at Sewanhaka, The Raven’s Quill, also known as The Chieftain prior to its name change, has been extant since the inception of the school. It has garnered many national and local awards, including the American Scholastic Press Award, Newsday High School Journalism Award, Hank Logerman Award, and an honorable mention in 2009 and 2010 during Adelphi Quill Young People's Press competition. Recently, in the 2025 Adelphi Quill Awards, the Raven’s Quill won 2nd place in multimedia submissions.

== Notable alumni ==
- Zendon Hamilton (born 1975), professional basketball player
- Alfred G. Hansen (born 1933), United States Air Force four-star general.
- Lloyd Harrison (born 1977), professional football player
- Evans Killeen (born 1936), professional baseball player
- Thomas Mallon (born 1951), book author and magazine contributor; member of the American Academy of Arts and Sciences
- Eamon McEneaney (1954-2001), lacrosse player, killed in the September 11 terror attacks
- Richie Moran (born 1937), lacrosse player and coach
- Zara Northover (born 1984), Olympian shot put
- Al Oerter (1936–2007), Olympic discus throw 4-time gold medalist
- Sal Paolantonio (born 1956), Philadelphia-based bureau reporter for ESPN, who primarily reports on NFL stories.
- Susan Prescott, Vice President of Enterprise and Education Marketing at Apple, Inc.
- Pete Richert (born 1939), Major League Baseball pitcher
- Telly Savalas (1922–1994), actor
- Vinny Testaverde (born 1963), college and professional quarterback, 1986 Heisman Trophy winner.
- Howard C. Vogts (1929–2010), the winningest high school football coach in New York State history
- Robert C. Wertz (1932-2009), politician who served for 32 years as a member of the New York State Assembly.

== See also ==
- Elmont Memorial High School
- Floral Park Memorial High School
- H. Frank Carey Junior-Senior High School
- New Hyde Park Memorial High School
