= Bellerose, New York =

- Village
- Incorporated Village of Bellerose
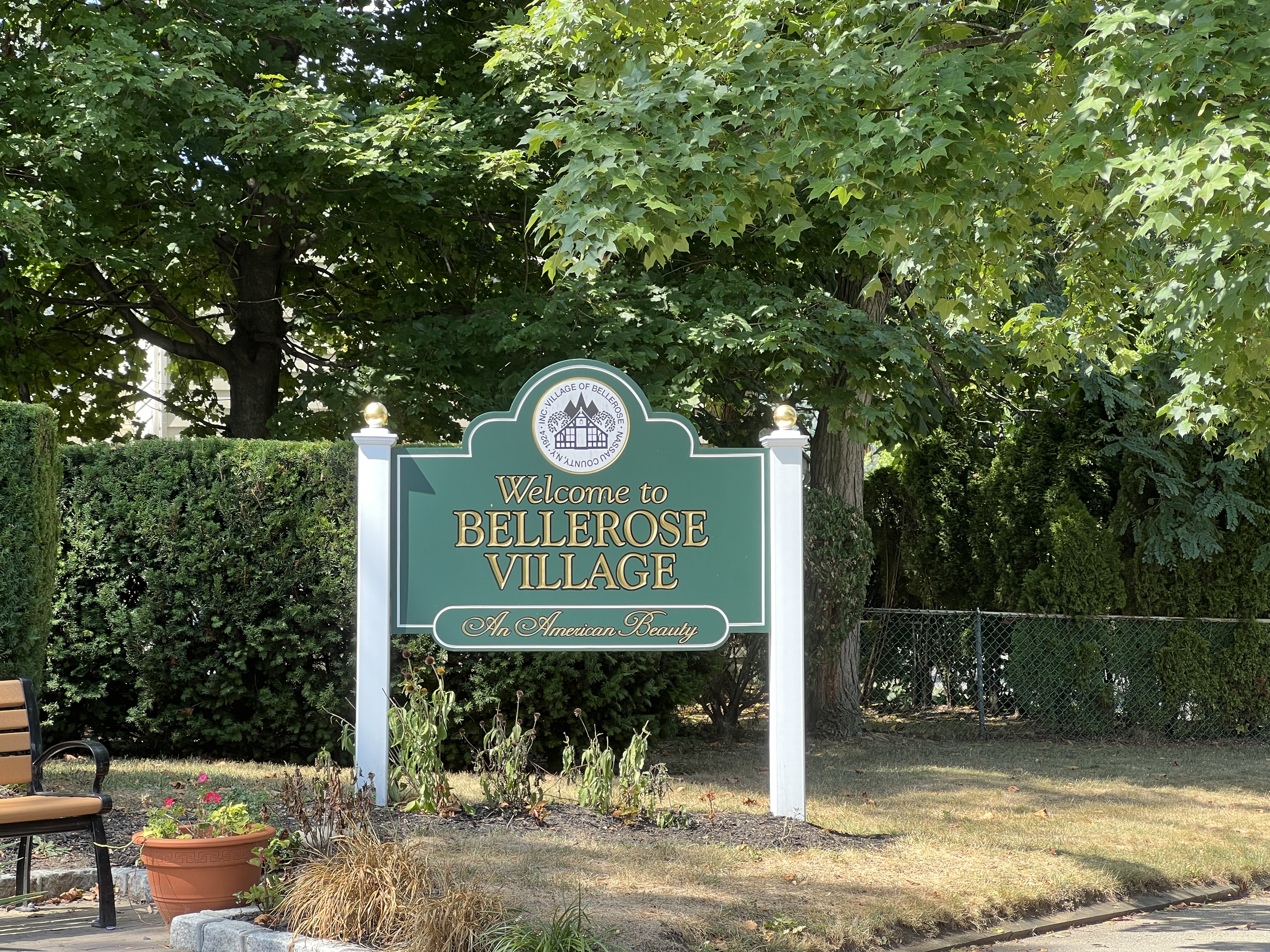
- A village welcome sign at the Bellerose station in August 2022
- Motto: "An American Beauty"
- Location in Nassau County and the state of New York

- Location on Long Island Location within the state of New York
- Coordinates: 40°43′24″N 73°42′59″W
- Country: United States
- State: New York
- County: Nassau
- Town: Hempstead
- Incorporated: 1924

Government
  - Mayor: Kenneth Moore
  - Deputy Mayor: Joseph Juliano

Area
  - Total: 0.13 sq mi (0.33 km^{2})
  - Land: 0.13 sq mi (0.33 km^{2})
  - Water: 0 sq mi (0.00 km^{2})
- Elevation: 85 ft (26 m)

Population (2020)
  - Total: 1,173
  - Density: 9,337.1/sq mi (3,605.08/km^{2})
- Time zone: UTC-5 (Eastern (EST))
  - Summer (DST): UTC-4 (EDT)
- Zip Code: 11001
- Area codes: 516, 363
- FIPS code: 36-05639
- GNIS feature ID: 0943608
- Website: www.bellerosevillage.org

Bellerose /bɛlroʊz/ is an incorporated village in the Town of Hempstead in Nassau County, on Long Island, in New York, United States. It is often referred to as Bellerose Village to distinguish itself from the neighborhood in Queens of the same name. The population was 1,173 at the time of 2020 census.

== History ==
What is now the village was founded by Helen Marsh of Williamsburg, Brooklyn. In 1907, planning to build a model community, Marsh purchased 77 acres (310,000 m^{2}) of Floral Park gladiola fields. The first Bellerose home was completed, under Marsh's supervision, in 1910. Marsh persuaded the Long Island Rail Road to place a station in the new village, and she named the station Bellerose. Though it has been suggested that she named the station for the Rose farm – located to the south of the railroad – and her daughter Belle, she said that she simply found the name "euphonious". A vote of the homeowners made the name official in 1917.

Bellerose incorporated itself as a village in 1924 in order to gain and maintain home rule.

The Bellerose Village Hall, Fire House and Police Booth are on both the New York State Register of Historic Places and the National Register of Historic Places; the complex is known as the Bellerose Village Municipal Complex.

== Geography ==
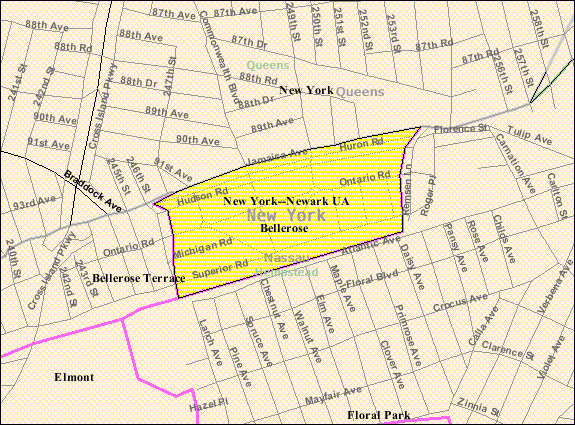
U.S. Census map of Bellerose

According to the United States Census Bureau, the village has a total area of 0.12 square miles (0.31 km^{2}), all land.

The village borders the New York City borough of Queens to the north, unincorporated Bellerose Terrace to the west, and the Village of Floral Park to the south.

=== Drainage ===
The Village of Bellerose is located within the Hook Creek Watershed, which – in turn – is located within the larger Long Island Sound/Atlantic Ocean Watershed.

=== Climate ===
According to the Köppen climate classification, Bellerose has a Humid subtropical climate (type Cfa) with cool, wet winters and hot, humid summers. Precipitation is uniform throughout the year, with slight spring and fall peaks.

Climate data for Bellerose, New York, 1991–2020 normals, extremes 1999–present
| Month | Jan | Feb | Mar | Apr | May | Jun | Jul | Aug | Sep | Oct | Nov | Dec | Year |
|---|---|---|---|---|---|---|---|---|---|---|---|---|---|
| Record high °F (°C) | 71 (22) | 73 (23) | 85 (29) | 94 (34) | 97 (36) | 103 (39) | 105 (41) | 104 (40) | 100 (38) | 90 (32) | 83 (28) | 76 (24) | 105 (41) |
| Mean daily maximum °F (°C) | 39 (4) | 43 (6) | 50 (10) | 61 (16) | 70 (21) | 80 (27) | 85 (29) | 83 (28) | 76 (24) | 65 (18) | 55 (13) | 45 (7) | 63 (17) |
| Mean daily minimum °F (°C) | 26 (−3) | 28 (−2) | 34 (1) | 42 (6) | 51 (11) | 61 (16) | 66 (19) | 65 (18) | 58 (14) | 48 (9) | 40 (4) | 31 (−1) | 46 (8) |
| Record low °F (°C) | −10 (−23) | −7 (−22) | 3 (−16) | 13 (−11) | 32 (0) | 43 (6) | 50 (10) | 48 (9) | 38 (3) | 27 (−3) | 10 (−12) | −1 (−18) | −10 (−23) |
| Average precipitation inches (mm) | 3.62 (92) | 3.17 (81) | 4.35 (110) | 4.15 (105) | 3.90 (99) | 3.85 (98) | 4.40 (112) | 3.72 (94) | 3.91 (99) | 4.08 (104) | 3.73 (95) | 3.82 (97) | 46.7 (1,186) |
Source: The Weather Channel

==== Plant zone ====
According to the United States Department of Agriculture (USDA), Bellerose is located within hardiness zone 7b.

== Demographics ==
Historical population
| Census | Pop. | Note | %± |
|---|---|---|---|
| 1930 | 1,202 | | — |
| 1940 | 1,317 | | 9.6% |
| 1950 | 1,134 | | −13.9% |
| 1960 | 1,083 | | −4.5% |
| 1970 | 1,136 | | 4.9% |
| 1980 | 1,187 | | 4.5% |
| 1990 | 1,101 | | −7.2% |
| 2000 | 1,173 | | 6.5% |
| 2010 | 1,193 | | 1.7% |
| 2020 | 1,173 | | −1.7% |
U.S. Decennial Census; 2010 2020

=== Racial and ethnic composition ===
Bellerose village, New York – Racial and ethnic composition Note: the US Census treats Hispanic/Latino as an ethnic category. This table excludes Latinos from the racial categories and assigns them to a separate category. Hispanics/Latinos may be of any race.
| Race / Ethnicity (NH = Non-Hispanic) | Pop 2000 | Pop 2010 | Pop 2020 | % 2000 | % 2010 | % 2020 |
|---|---|---|---|---|---|---|
| White alone (NH) | 1,027 | 964 | 896 | 87.55% | 80.80% | 76.39% |
| Black or African American alone (NH) | 5 | 35 | 36 | 0.43% | 2.93% | 3.07% |
| Native American or Alaska Native alone (NH) | 0 | 4 | 1 | 0.00% | 0.34% | 0.09% |
| Asian alone (NH) | 78 | 52 | 62 | 6.65% | 4.36% | 5.29% |
| Native Hawaiian or Pacific Islander alone (NH) | 0 | 0 | 1 | 0.00% | 0.00% | 0.09% |
| Other race alone (NH) | 2 | 5 | 13 | 0.17% | 0.42% | 1.11% |
| Mixed race or Multiracial (NH) | 10 | 20 | 43 | 0.85% | 1.68% | 3.67% |
| Hispanic or Latino (any race) | 51 | 113 | 121 | 4.35% | 9.47% | 10.32% |
| Total | 1,173 | 1,193 | 1,173 | 100.00% | 100.00% | 100.00% |

=== 2000 Census ===
As of the census of 2000, there were 1,173 people, 378 households, and 333 families residing in the village. The population density was 12,207.3 inhabitants per square mile (4,713.3/km^{2}). There were 384 housing units at an average density of 3,996.2 per square mile (1,542.9/km^{2}). The racial makeup of the village was 90.79% White, 0.43% African American, 6.65% Asian, 0.85% from other races, and 1.28% from two or more races. Hispanic or Latino of any race were 4.35% of the population.

There were 378 households, out of which 42.6% had children under the age of 18 living with them, 78.3% were married couples living together, 6.3% had a female householder with no husband present, and 11.9% were non-families. 9.8% of all households were made up of individuals, and 5.6% had someone living alone who was 65 years of age or older. The average household size was 3.10 and the average family size was 3.32.

In the village, the population was spread out, with 25.4% under the age of 18, 7.5% from 18 to 24, 27.0% from 25 to 44, 28.6% from 45 to 64, and 11.4% who were 65 years of age or older. The median age was 39 years. For every 100 females, there were 96.8 males. For every 100 females age 18 and over, there were 92.7 males.

The median income for a household in the village was $100,263, and the median income for a family was $110,404. Males had a median income of $72,917 versus $50,625 for females. The per capita income for the village was $36,446. None of the families and 0.9% of the population were living below the poverty line, including no under eighteens and 1.3% of those over 64.

== Government ==
As of August 2022, the Mayor of Bellerose is Kenneth Moore, the Deputy Mayor is Joseph Juliano, and the Village Trustees are Ann Marie Byrnes, Kate Dorry, and Daniel Driscoll.

=== Politics ===
In the 2024 United States presidential election, the majority of Bellerose voters voted for Donald Trump (R).

== Education ==
It is in the Floral Park-Bellerose Union Free School District and the Sewanhaka Central High School District.

== Notable people ==
- Joanne Persico, volleyball coach
- John P. Shanley (1915-1985), journalist, specializing in radio, television and drama, who spent much of his career with The New York Times.
- Nick Wall, (1906-1983), jockey

== See also ==
- List of municipalities in New York
- Bellerose Terrace, New York – an unincorporated hamlet located adjacent to the village, to its west.
- Bellerose, Queens – a nearby neighborhood within the City of New York.
