= Bellerose Terrace, New York =

- Hamlet and census-designated place
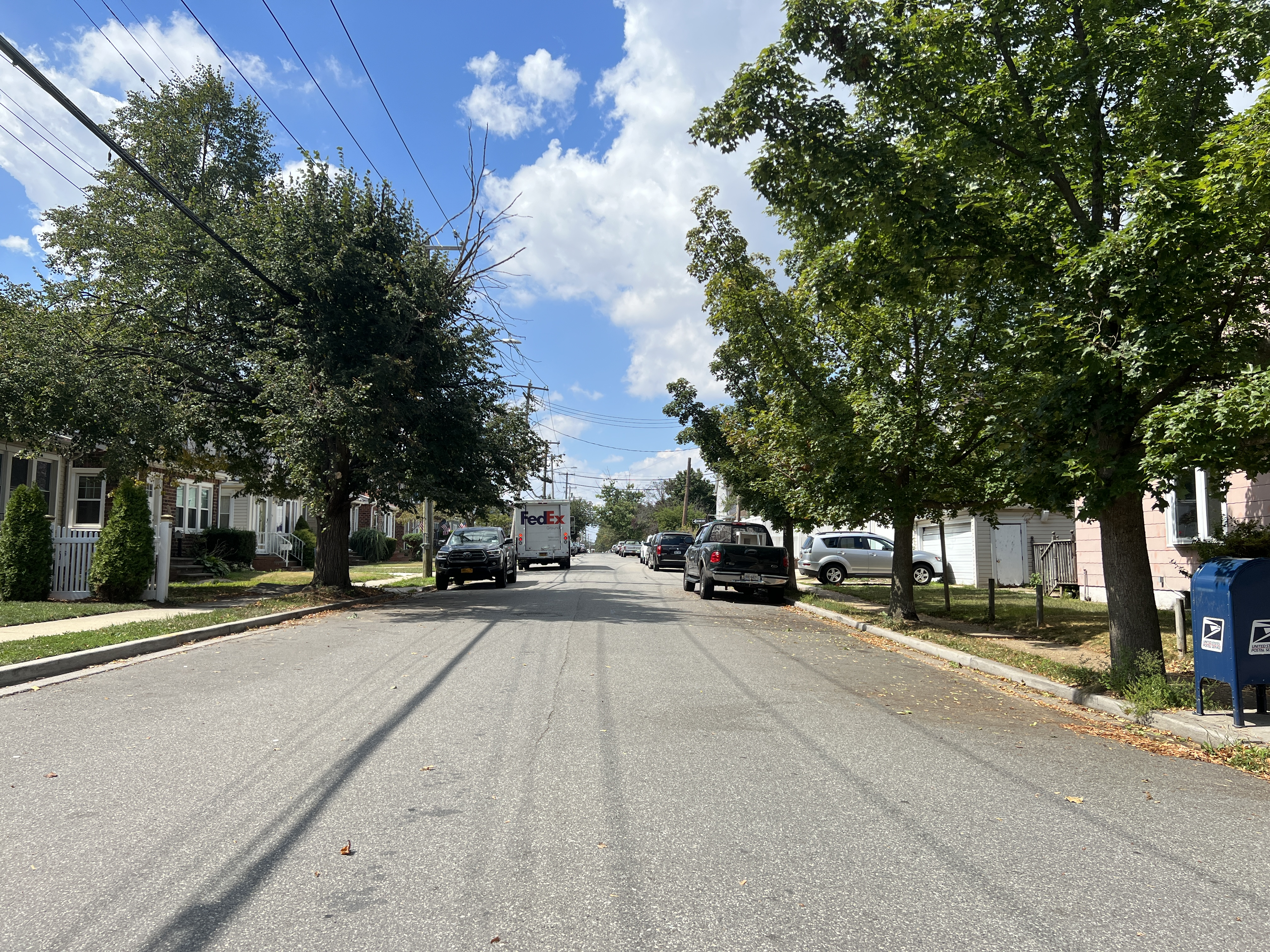
- 246th Street in Bellerose Terrace, seen in 2022

- Location in Nassau County and the state of New York

- Location on Long Island Location within the state of New York
- Coordinates: 40°43′17″N 73°43′26″W
- Country: United States
- State: New York
- County: Nassau
- Town: Hempstead

Area
  - Total: 0.12 sq mi (0.32 km^{2})
  - Land: 0.12 sq mi (0.32 km^{2})
  - Water: 0 sq mi (0.00 km^{2})
- Elevation: 75 ft (23 m)

Population (2020)
  - Total: 2,329
  - Density: 18,647.3/sq mi (7,199.76/km^{2})
- Time zone: UTC-5 (Eastern (EST))
  - Summer (DST): UTC-4 (EDT)
- ZIP Code: 11001 (Floral Park)
- Area codes: 516, 363
- FIPS code: 36-05661
- GNIS feature ID: 0943609

Bellerose Terrace is a hamlet and census-designated place (CDP) within the Town of Hempstead in Nassau County, on Long Island, in New York, United States. The population was 2,329 at the time of the 2020 census.

== History ==
When the Long Island Rail Road's Elmont–UBS Arena station opened on November 20, 2021, only the eastbound platform was operating. The westbound platform subsequently opened on October 6, 2022.

== Geography ==
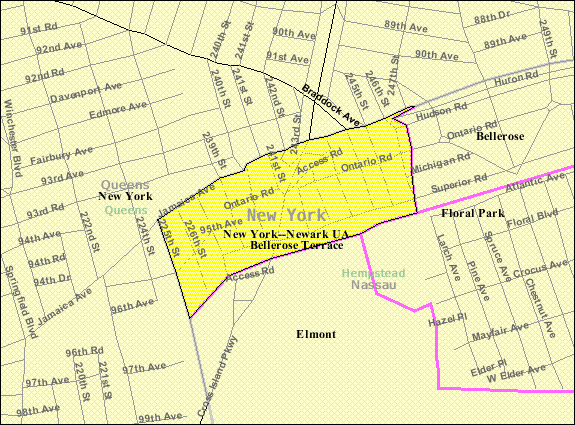
U.S. Census map of Bellerose Terrace

According to the United States Census Bureau, the CDP has a total area of 0.1 square miles (0.26 km^{2}), all land.

Bellerose Terrace is located on the border of Queens County. It is adjacent to the neighborhoods of Bellerose, Queens and Queens Village, Queens in New York City, the Incorporated Village of Bellerose in Nassau County to the east, the Incorporated Village of Floral Park to the southeast, and unincorporated Elmont to the south.

=== Drainage ===
Bellerose Terrace is located within the Hook Creek Watershed, which is, in turn, located within the larger Long Island Sound/Atlantic Ocean Watershed.

=== Climate ===
According to the Köppen climate classification, Bellerose Terrace has a Humid subtropical climate (type Cfa) with cool, wet winters and hot, humid summers. Precipitation is uniform throughout the year, with slight spring and fall peaks.

Climate data for Bellerose Terrace, New York, 1991–2020 normals, extremes 1999–present
Month	Jan	Feb	Mar	Apr	May	Jun	Jul	Aug	Sep	Oct	Nov	Dec	Year
Record high °F (°C)	71 (22)	73 (23)	85 (29)	94 (34)	97 (36)	103 (39)	105 (41)	104 (40)	100 (38)	90 (32)	83 (28)	76 (24)	105 (41)
Mean daily maximum °F (°C)	39 (4)	43 (6)	50 (10)	61 (16)	70 (21)	80 (27)	85 (29)	83 (28)	76 (24)	65 (18)	55 (13)	45 (7)	63 (17)
Mean daily minimum °F (°C)	26 (−3)	28 (−2)	34 (1)	42 (6)	51 (11)	61 (16)	66 (19)	65 (18)	58 (14)	48 (9)	40 (4)	31 (−1)	46 (8)
Record low °F (°C)	−10 (−23)	−7 (−22)	3 (−16)	13 (−11)	32 (0)	43 (6)	50 (10)	48 (9)	38 (3)	27 (−3)	10 (−12)	−1 (−18)	−10 (−23)
Average precipitation inches (mm)	3.62 (92)	3.17 (81)	4.35 (110)	4.15 (105)	3.90 (99)	3.85 (98)	4.40 (112)	3.72 (94)	3.91 (99)	4.08 (104)	3.73 (95)	3.82 (97)	46.7 (1,186)
Source: The Weather Channel

==== Plant zone ====
According to the United States Department of Agriculture (USDA), Bellerose Terrace is located within hardiness zone 7b.

== Demographics ==
Historical population
Census	Pop.	Note	%±
1960	2,314		—
1970	2,090		−9.7%
1980	1,951		−6.7%
2000	2,157		—
2010	2,198		1.9%
2020	2,329		6.0%
U.S. Decennial Census; 2010 2020 Long Island Historical Population

=== Racial and ethnic composition ===
Bellerose Terrace CDP, New York – Racial and ethnic composition Note: the US Census treats Hispanic/Latino as an ethnic category. This table excludes Latinos from the racial categories and assigns them to a separate category. Hispanics/Latinos may be of any race.
Race / Ethnicity (NH = Non-Hispanic)	Pop 2000	Pop 2010	Pop 2020	% 2000	% 2010	% 2020
White alone (NH)	1,176	764	601	54.52%	34.76%	25.81%
Black or African American alone (NH)	122	168	151	5.66%	7.64%	6.48%
Native American or Alaska Native alone (NH)	4	1	15	0.19%	0.05%	0.64%
Asian alone (NH)	337	611	782	15.62%	27.80%	33.58%
Native Hawaiian or Pacific Islander alone (NH)	1	0	1	0.05%	0.00%	0.04%
Other race alone (NH)	33	37	47	1.53%	1.68%	2.02%
Mixed race or Multiracial (NH)	55	49	77	2.55%	2.23%	3.31%
Hispanic or Latino (any race)	429	568	655	19.89%	25.84%	28.12%
Total	2,157	2,198	2,329	100.00%	100.00%	100.00%

=== 2020 census ===
As of the 2020 census, Bellerose Terrace had a population of 2,329. The median age was 39.7 years. 22.0% of residents were under the age of 18 and 14.4% were 65 years of age or older. For every 100 females, there were 103.2 males, and for every 100 females age 18 and over, there were 101.2 males.

100.0% of residents lived in urban areas and 0.0% lived in rural areas.

There were 670 households, of which 40.7% had children under the age of 18 living in them. Of all households, 63.1% were married-couple households, 14.3% had a male householder and no spouse or partner present, and 18.8% had a female householder and no spouse or partner present. About 10.0% of all households were made up of individuals, and 4.0% had someone living alone who was 65 years of age or older.

There were 692 housing units, of which 3.2% were vacant. The homeowner vacancy rate was 0.0% and the rental vacancy rate was 4.3%.

=== 2010 census ===
As of the census of 2010, there were 2,198 people, 633 households, and 544 families residing in the CDP. The population density was 22,212.2 inhabitants per square mile (8,576.2/km^{2}). There were 587 housing units at an average density of 6,683.2 per square mile (2,580.4/km^{2}). The racial makeup of the CDP was 49.5% White, 8.4% African American, 0.1% Native American, 28.1% Asian, 0.00% Pacific Islander, 10.4% from other races, and 3.5% from two or more races. Hispanic or Latino of any race were 25.8% of the population.

There were 633 households, out of which 41.9% had children under the age of 18 living with them, 66.8% were married couples living together, 13.3% had a female householder with no husband present, and 14.1% were non-families. 11.2% of all households were made up of individuals, and 4.3% had someone living alone who was 65 years of age or older. The average household size was 3.47 and the average family size was 3.76.

In the CDP, the population was spread out, with 24.1% under the age of 18, 9.6% from 18 to 24, 29.7% from 25 to 44, 27.5% from 45 to 64, and 9.1% who were 65 years of age or older. The median age was 37.9 years. For every 100 females, there were 98.2 males. For every 100 females age 18 and over, there were 89.5 males.

=== Income and poverty ===
The median income for a household in the CDP was $92,750, and the median income for a family was $96,094. Males had a median income of $52,617 versus $53,478 for females. The per capita income for the CDP was $31,802. About 3.8% of families and 3.8% of the population were below the poverty line, including none of those under age 18 and 10.8% of those age 65 or over. According to the 2013 American Community Survey, 29.9% of families make $100,000 to $199,000 and 15.3% make $200,000 or more.

== Education ==
Bellerose Terrace is served by the Floral Park-Bellerose Union Free School District for elementary education, and the Sewanhaka Central High School District for secondary education; the elementary district feeds into the Sewanhaka CHSD. Accordingly, all children who reside within Bellerose Terrace attend school in one of these two districts, depending on their age.

== Transportation ==
=== Road ===
One controlled-access highway – the Cross Island Parkway – travels through the heart of Bellerose Terrace. New York State Route 25 and Jamaica Avenue, meanwhile, form the eastern and western portions of the hamlet's northern border, respectively, with the City of New York.

Other major roads within Bellerose Terrace include 238th Street and Superior Road.

=== Rail ===
The Long Island Rail Road's Main Line runs along the southern border of Bellerose Terrace, with Elmont and the Incorporated Village of Floral Park.

Additionally, the LIRR's Elmont–UBS Arena station – located along the Main Line – directly serves Bellerose Terrace, with an entrance being located on Superior Road within the hamlet.

=== Bus ===
MTA Bus's Q110 and NICE Bus's n1 and n24 buses serves Bellrose Terrace.

== See also ==
- Bellerose, New York
- Bellerose, Queens
