= Floral Park Memorial High School =

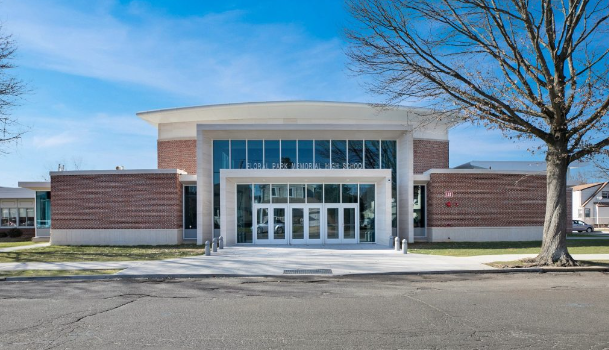
- Floral Park Memorial High School in 2026

Location
- 210 Locust Street; Floral Park, New York 11001; United States; 40°42′53″N 73°42′19″W

Information
- Type: Public high school
- Established: 1957
- School district: Sewanhaka Central High School District
- NCES School ID: 3626520
- Principal: Principal Alicia Calabrese Assistant Principals Michael Farina Dr Kevin Sullivan
- Teaching staff: 103.78 FTEs
- Grades: 7–12
- Enrollment: 1,327 (as of 2023–2024)
- Student to teacher ratio: 12.79
- Colors: Red, white, and black
- Nickname: Knights
- Newspaper: Knightly Knews
- Website: www.sewanhakaschools.org/o/fpm

Floral Park Memorial High School is a coeducational, public high school in Floral Park, New York, United States. It is one of five schools in the Sewanhaka Central High School District. It enrolls students in grades 7 through 12.

As of the 2018–19 school year, the school had an enrollment of 1,389 students and 94.0 classroom teachers (on an FTE basis), for a student–teacher ratio of 14.8:1. There were 253 students (18.2% of enrollment) eligible for free lunch and 38 (2.7% of students) eligible for reduced-cost lunch.

== Awards and recognition ==
During the 1994–96 school years, Floral Park Memorial High School was recognized with the Blue Ribbon School Award of Excellence by the United States Department of Education, the highest award an American school can receive. The school also received a U.S. News gold medal for being one of the best public high schools in the United States.

== Athletics ==
The school has color guard and marching band, junior varsity and varsity boys' and girls' basketball, boys' baseball, boys' and girls' track, girls' softball, boys' and girls' volleyball, boys' and girls' soccer, boys' and girls' lacrosse, boys' football, girls' field hockey boys' riflery, girls' cheerleading, and kickline.

The varsity girls' basketball team were the 2006–2007 and 2007–2008 Nassau County Class "A" Champions. They were the Long Island Champions in 2007–2008 and in 2008–2009. In addition, the Boys Soccer team won the NYS Championship in 2024 under head coach Ahkeel Rodney. In 2026, the Boys basketball team won its second consecutive Nassau County championship, and then proceeded to accomplish the goal of winning the LI Championship in a rematch against Mt. Sinai.

== World record ==
In 2007, students at Floral Park Memorial High School broke the Guinness Book of World Records' previous record for the most hugs in one hour by a single person. The event was a fundraiser for a scholarship in the honor of two students who died at the end of the 2005–2006 school year.

== See also ==
- Elmont Memorial High School
- H. Frank Carey Junior-Senior High School
- New Hyde Park Memorial High School
- Sewanhaka High School
