= Marco Rivera =

American football player (born 1972)

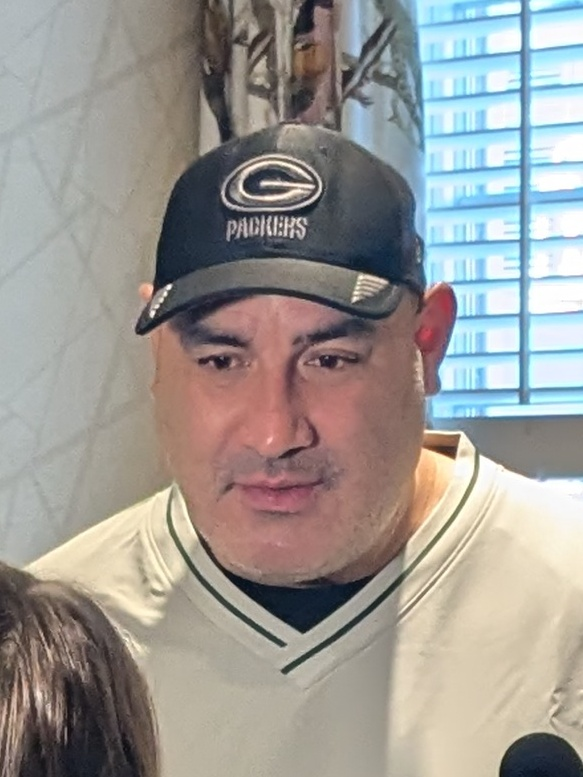
- Rivera in 2025

No. 63, 62
- Position: Guard

Personal information
- Born: April 26, 1972 (age 54); Brooklyn, New York, U.S.
- Listed height: 6 ft 4 in (1.93 m)
- Listed weight: 309 lb (140 kg)

Career information
- High school: Elmont Memorial (Elmont, New York)
- College: Penn State
- NFL draft: 1996: 6th round, 208th overall pick

Career history
- Green Bay Packers (1996–2004); → Scottish Claymores (1997); Dallas Cowboys (2005–2006)

Awards and highlights
- Super Bowl champion (XXXI); First-team All-Pro (2004); Second-team All-Pro (2003); 3× Pro Bowl (2002–2004); Green Bay Packers Hall of Fame (2011); 2× Second-team All-Big Ten (1995, 1996)

Career NFL statistics
- Games played: 155
- Games started: 141
- Fumble recoveries: 3
- Stats at Pro Football Reference

Marco Anthony Rivera (born April 26, 1972) is an American former professional football player who was a guard in the National Football League (NFL) for the Green Bay Packers and Dallas Cowboys. He played college football for the Penn State Nittany Lions.

== Early life ==
Rivera attended Elmont Memorial High School, where he played at guard, defensive end and linebacker. As a senior, he received All-New York, All-county and honorable mention All-American honors. He helped his team win 3 conference titles, while making almost 300 tackles, 16 sacks and 6 interceptions.

He also received All-conference honors in basketball and lacrosse.

== College career ==
Rivera accepted a football scholarship from Penn State University from 1992 to 1995. As a freshman he was a backup at guard. As a sophomore, he became a starter at right tackle, but was lost for the season with a shoulder injury he suffered in the ninth game against the University of Illinois.

As a junior, he was moved to right guard, contributing to the team leading the nation in scoring (47.8 points per game) and total offense (520.2 points per game.

He played in 41 career games (31 starts), including three bowl games – the Outback, Rose and Blockbuster. He earned second-team All-Big Ten honors in both his junior and senior seasons. He earned his Bachelor of Science in Administration of Justice from Penn State in 1995.

== Professional career ==
=== Green Bay Packers ===
Rivera was selected by the Green Bay Packers in the sixth round (208th overall) of the 1996 NFL draft. During his first year, he was inactive for all 16 regular season games. He was a key practice contributor to the Packers run to their twelfth title in Super Bowl XXXI.

In 1997, Rivera was allocated to the Scottish Claymores of the World League and started all ten games, helping his team finish third in the league in total offense. He was named honorable mention All-World League by Pro Football Weekly. Rivera returned to Green Bay and saw action in 14 regular season games, primarily on special teams as a member of the field goal and extra point units and on kickoffs. He was inactive for the Packers first two contests before seeing action in the club's final 14 games as well as all three playoff contests.

In 1998, Rivera started 15 of 16 regular season games at the left guard spot after winning the job in training camp over another ex-Claymore, Joe Andruzzi. He also started the Packers NFC Wild Card playoff game at San Francisco. In 1999, Rivera started all 16 games for the first time in his career, playing the entire season at right guard after successfully making the transition from the left side where he had started the year before. In 2000 and 2001, Rivera started 32 consecutive games at right guard for the three straight seasons.

In 2002, Rivera raised his game to a higher level in his fifth season as a starter with a performance that earned him his first career Pro Bowl selection. He started every game of the season – despite playing with torn medial collateral ligaments in both knees.

In 2003, Rivera battled through a knee injury that he suffered late in the preseason and went on to start all 16 games (and two playoff games) for the fifth straight year. He was named as a starter on the NFC Pro Bowl squad after serving as a backup for his initial appearance in the NFL's annual all-star game in 2002. He was also a second-team All-Pro selection of the Associated Press and Football Digest as well as being named to the All-NFC team as selected by Pro Football Weekly.

In 2004, Rivera was the anchor on the Green Bay offensive line, Rivera completed his seventh straight season as a starting guard. In starting all 16 regular season games, plus the playoff contest against Minnesota, Rivera earned the starting guard spot on the NFC Pro Bowl squad for a second straight season and also was named to the All-NFC squad by Pro Football Weekly.

Rivera was named to the 2011 class of the Green Bay Packers Hall of Fame.

=== Dallas Cowboys ===
On March 3, 2005, the Dallas Cowboys acquired Rivera in free agency, after he was coming off his third consecutive Pro Bowl nomination and had a streak of 106 consecutive games played. He signed a five-year, $20 million contract with a signing bonus of $9 million (tying the largest ever given to a guard). He injured his back during an offseason workout while running on a treadmill and underwent microdiscectomy surgery to repair a herniated disc. He recovered in time for training camp and the regular season, but suffered a sprained neck injury against the Washington Redskins in week 15 and would miss the final two games. He also underwent offseason surgery in his two elbows.

In 2006, he started 16 games at right guard, but injured his back in the wildcard playoff loss against the Seattle Seahawks and underwent his second back surgery in two years to repair a herniated disc. On June 7, 2007, Rivera was released due to serious back problems and eventually retired. The Cowboys signed free agent Leonard Davis to replace him.

Rivera played in 155 games starting a total of 141, while registering 12 tackles and 3 fumble recoveries as an offensive lineman. He received three Pro Bowl selections.

== Personal life ==
Rivera is of Puerto Rican descent. He spent time as a volunteer coach with the Miami Dolphins, under two of his previous coaches from the Cowboys and Packers (Tony Sparano, Joe Philbin).
