= Garden City Union Free School District =

School district in the U.S. state of New York

Coordinates: 40.723508°N 73.642680°W

Address
- 56 Cathedral Avenue, Garden City, NY 11530 Garden City, New York United States

District information
- Type: Public school district
- Motto: "Inspiring Minds, Empowering Achievement, Building Community"
- Grades: PK–12
- Superintendent: Kusum Sinha
- Schools: 7
- NCES District ID: 3611760

Students and staff
- Students: 3,931 (2024–25)
- Teachers: 311.17 (FTE)
- Student–teacher ratio: 12.02

Other information
- Website: www.gardencity.k12.ny.us

The Garden City Union Free School District is an American public school district headquartered at 56 Cathedral Avenue in Garden City, New York, 11530. It serves nearly all of the Village of Garden City, along with small portions of the villages of Mineola and Stewart Manor.

The Garden City Union Free School District was rated in 2020 by Great Schools as 14th in New York and 44th overall in the country.

== Schools ==
The Garden City UFSD operates the following schools:

- Garden City High School
- Garden City Middle School
- Stewart School
- Stratford School
- Homestead Schools
- Locust School
- Hemlock School

== See also ==
- List of school districts in New York
- Mineola Union Free School District
