= Elmont Union Free School District =

School district in New York, United States

Elmont Union Free School District, also known as Elmont School District 16, is an elementary school district in Nassau County, New York, in the New York City metropolitan area. The district headquarters are in Elmont.

The district includes most of Elmont and Stewart Manor, all of South Floral Park, and portions of Franklin Square, New Hyde Park, and North Valley Stream.

== History ==
In March 2020 Kenneth Rosner became the superintendent.

In 2022 the district began a kindergarten program which takes up the entire school day, instead of part of the school day.

In spring 2023, Rosner stated he was to leave that position and become the superintendent of the East Meadow School District.

== Schools ==
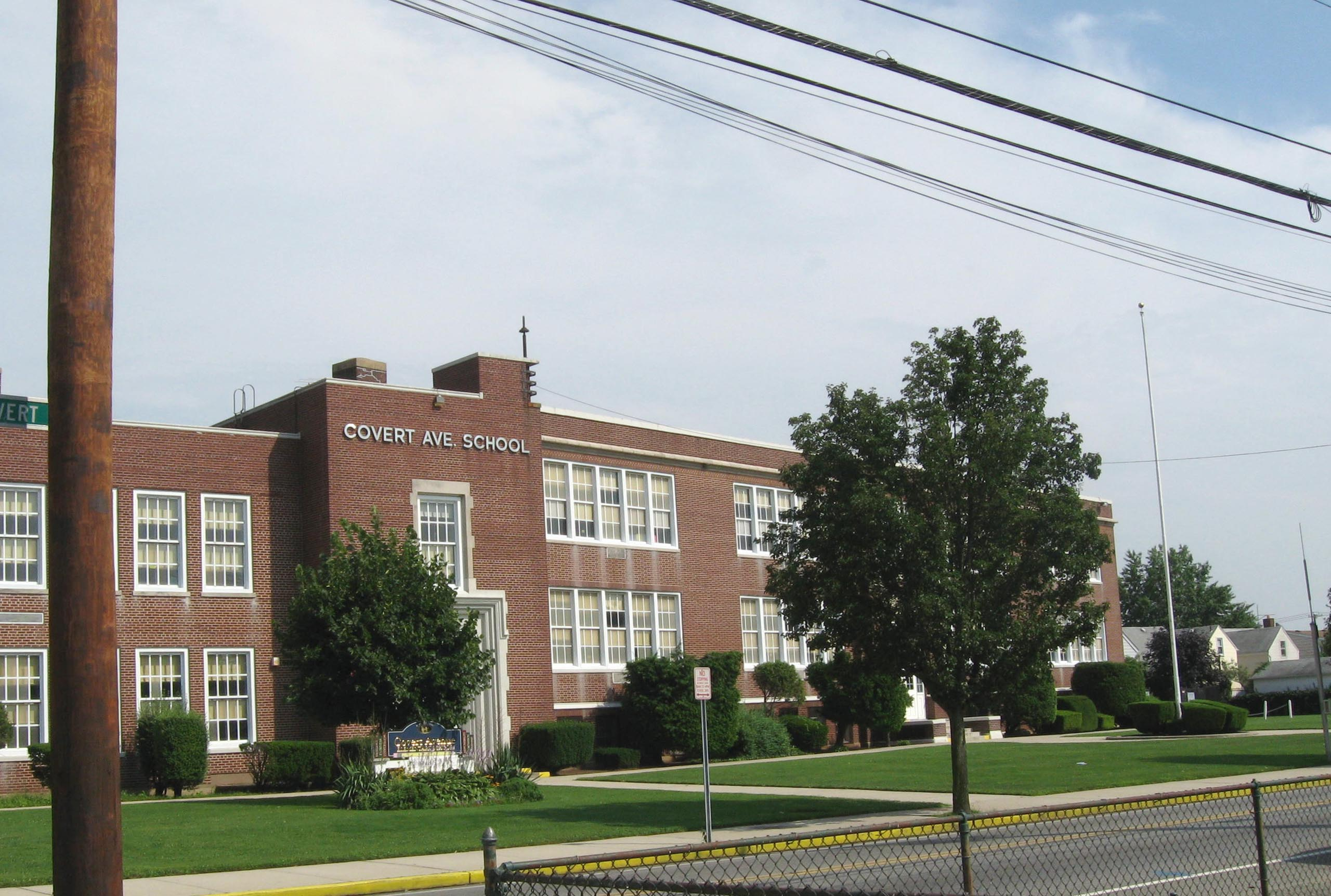
Covert Avenue School

- Alden Terrace School
- Clara H. Carlson School
- Covert Avenue School
- Dutch Broadway School
- Gotham Avenue School
- Stewart Manor School
