= Floral Park-Bellerose Union Free School District =

School district in New York, United States

Address
- 1 Poppy Place Floral Park, New York, 11001; United States

District information
- Type: Public
- Grades: PK–6
- Schools: 2
- NCES District ID: 3611160

Students and staff
- Students: 1,584 (2024–2025)
- Teachers: 103.00 (on an FTE basis) (2024–2025)
- Staff: 147.00 (on an FTE basis) (2024–2025)
- Student–teacher ratio: 15.38 (2024–2025)

Other information
- Website: www.fpbsd.org

Floral Park-Bellerose Union Free School District, also known as Floral Park-Bellerose School District 22, is a school district headquartered in Floral Park, New York, in the New York City metropolitan area. Its boundary includes Floral Park, Bellerose, Bellerose Terrace, and a small portion of North New Hyde Park. The district includes sections of the following towns: Hempstead and North Hempstead.

== History ==
In September 1929, the Floral Park-Bellerose School began operations. It had 38 classrooms in 1956. Circa 1931, the John Lewis Childs School began a program for students with reduced vision.

In 1956 the district was the only Nassau County elementary school district that owed no debts.

In 2009 the district proposed an election for a new busing system and a bond in which new playgrounds would be built.
