= List of Long Island public school districts and schools =

Long Island's Nassau and Suffolk counties are home to 125 public school districts, containing a total of 656 public schools.

The list below contains each of Long Island's school districts, along with their respective schools.

== A ==
=== Amagansett Union Free School District ===
- Amagansett School

=== Amityville Union Free School District ===
- Amityville Memorial High School
- Park Avenue School
- Edmund W. Miles Middle School
- Northeast School
- Northwest Elementary School

== B ==
=== Babylon Union Free School District ===
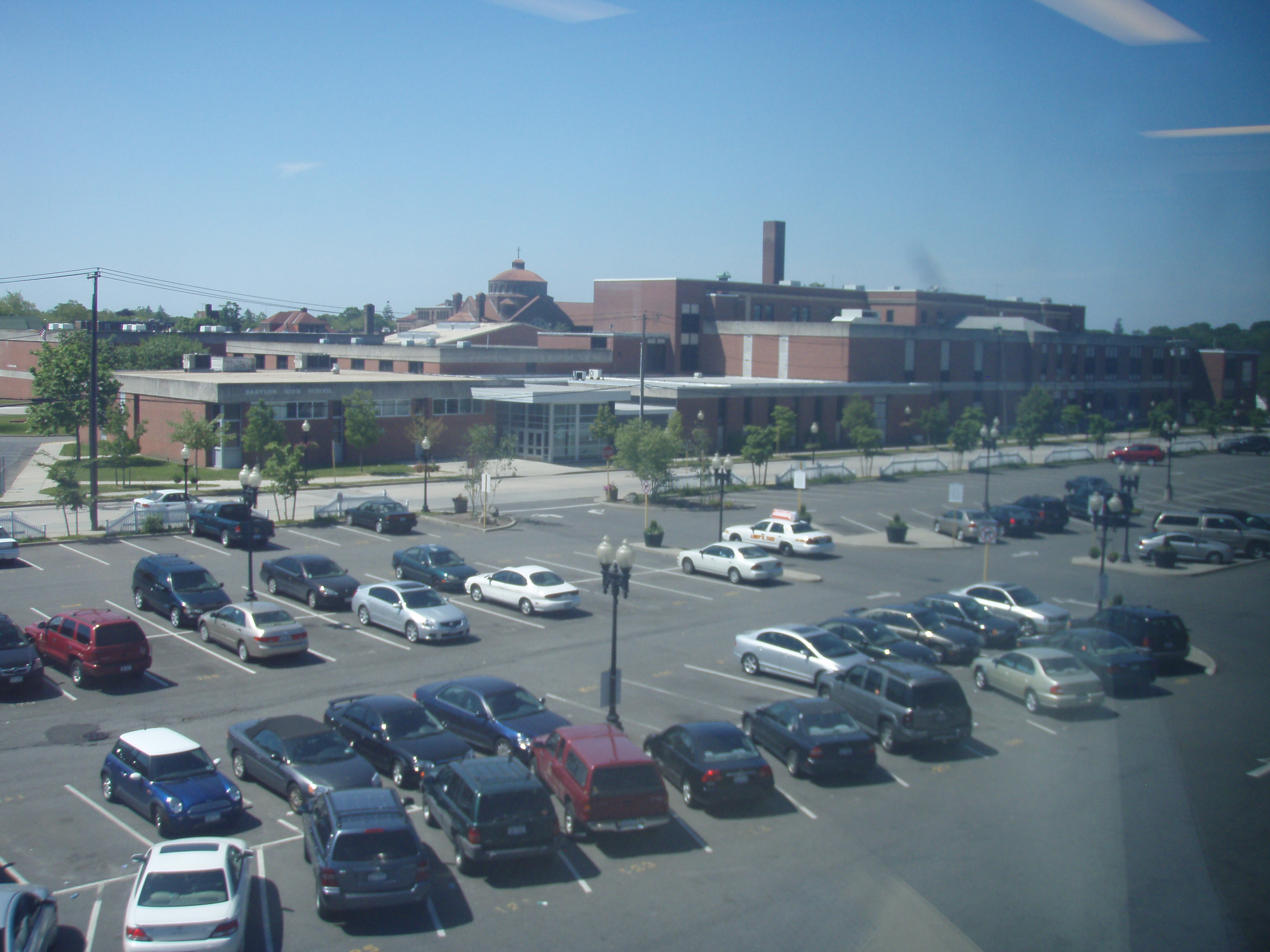
Babylon High School, as seen from the Babylon LIRR station.

- Babylon Memorial Grade School
- Babylon Junior-Senior High School
- Babylon Elementary School

=== Baldwin Union Free School District ===
- Baldwin Middle School
- Brookside Elementary School
- Baldwin Senior High School
- Lenox Elementary School
- Meadow Elementary School
- Milburn Elementary School
- Plaza Elementary School
- Shubert Elementary School
- Steele Elementary School

=== Bay Shore Union Free School District ===
- Bay Shore Middle School
- Bay Shore Senior High School
- Brook Avenue Elementary School
- Fifth Avenue School
- Gardiner Manor School
- Mary G. Clarkson School
- South Country School

=== Bayport-Blue Point Union Free School District ===
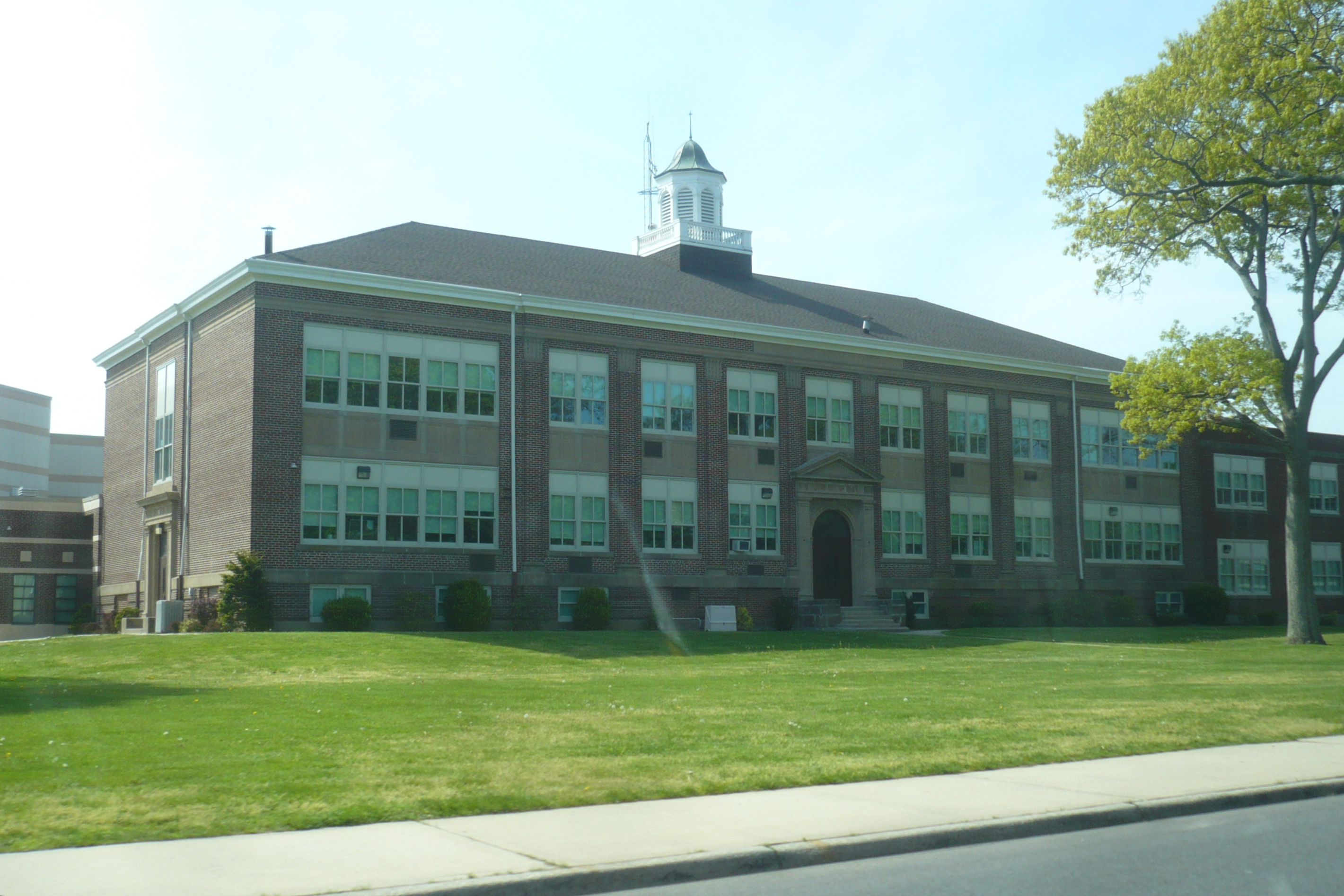
The original section of the Bayport-Blue Point High School.

- James Wilson Young Middle School
- Bayport-Blue Point High School
- Academy Street Elementary School
- Blue Point Elementary School
- Sylvan Avenue Elementary School

=== Bellmore Union Free School District ===
- Shore Road School
- Reinhard Early Childhood Center
- Winthrop Avenue School

=== Bellmore-Merrick Central High School District ===
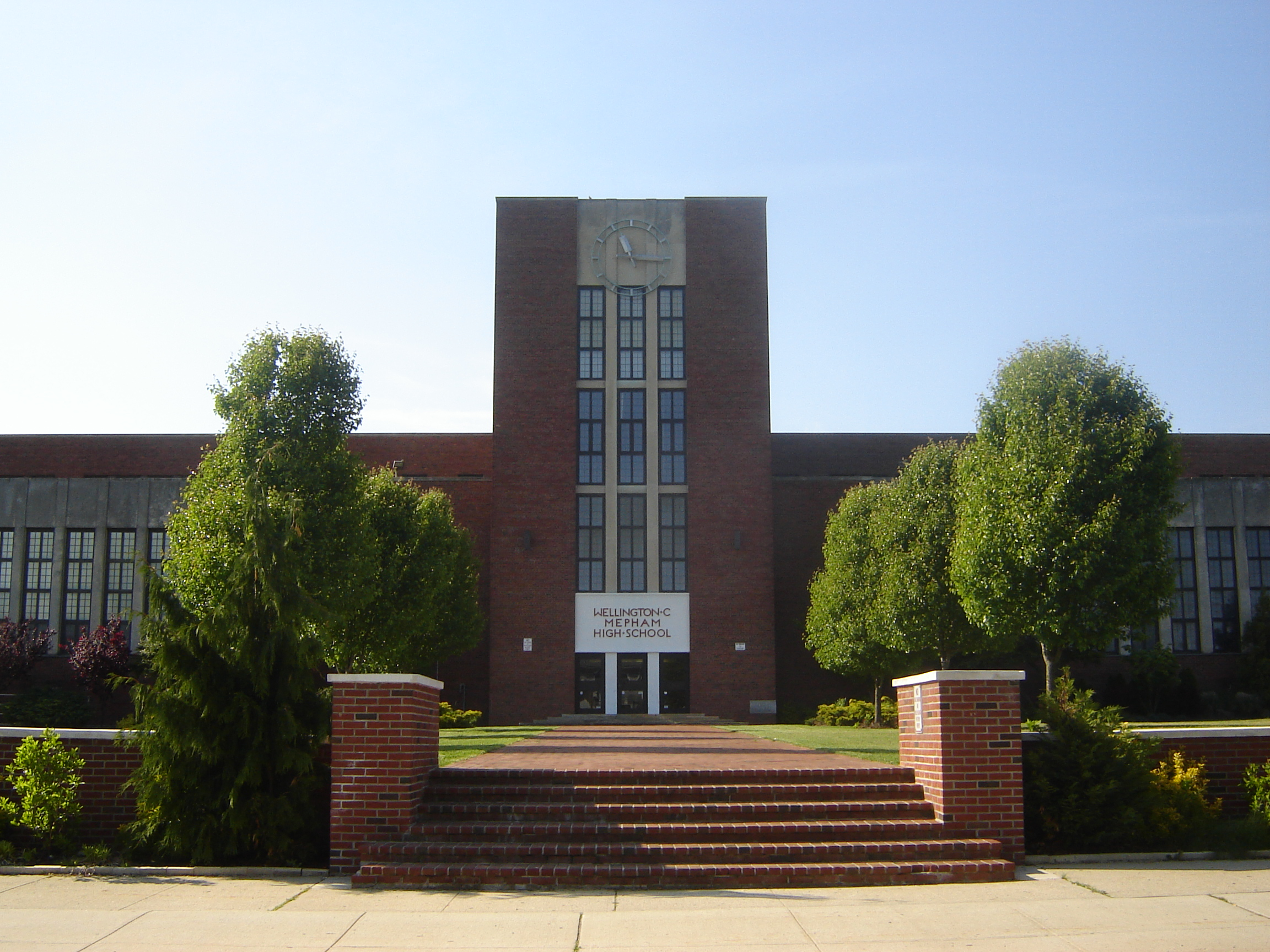
The front of Wellington C. Mepham High School.

- Merrick Avenue Middle School
- Grand Avenue Middle School
- John F. Kennedy High School
- Sanford H. Calhoun High School
- Wellington C. Mepham High School

=== Bethpage Union Free School District ===
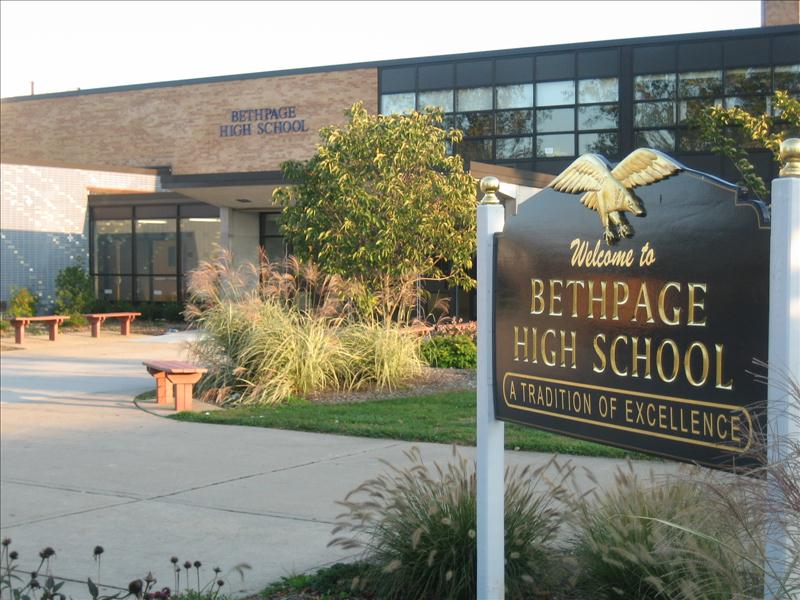
The front of Bethpage High School.

- Bethpage Senior High School
- John F. Kennedy Middle School
- Central Boulevard Elementary School
- Charles Campagne School
- Kramer Lane Elementary School

=== Brentwood Union Free School District ===
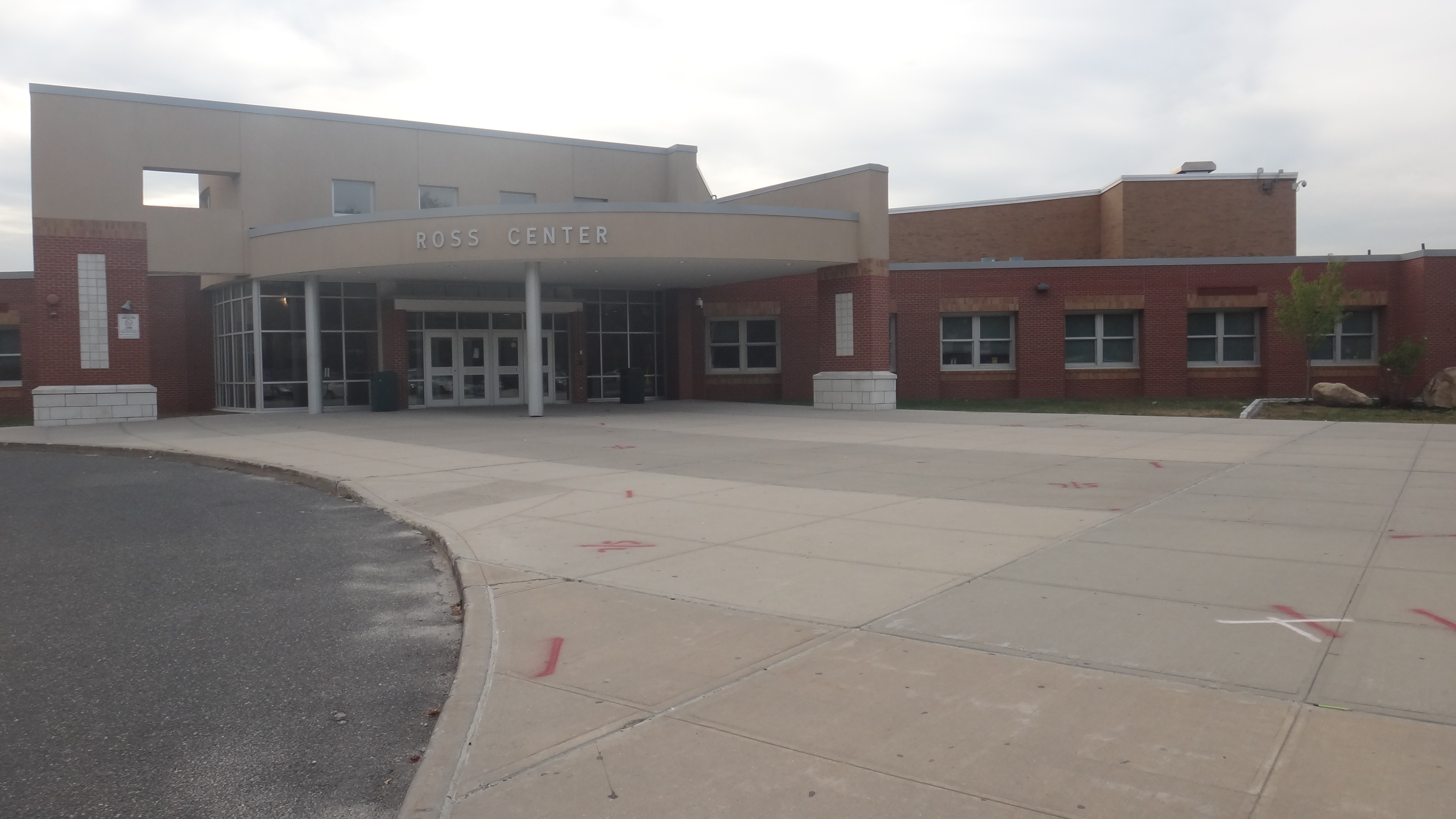
Brentwood High School's Ross Center entrance.

- Brentwood High School
- North Middle School
- South Middle School
- West Middle School
- East Middle School
- Freshman Center
- East Elementary School
- Hemlock Park Elementary School
- Laurel Park Elementary School
- Loretta Park Elementary School
- North Elementary School
- Northeast Elementary School
- Oak Park Elementary School
- Pine Park Elementary School
- Southeast Elementary School
- Southwest Elementary School
- Twin Pines Elementary School

=== Bridgehampton Union Free School District ===
- Bridgehampton School

== C ==
=== Carle Place Union Free School District ===
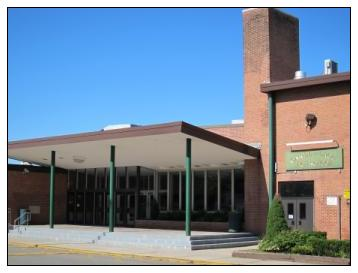
The entrance to Carle Place Middle/High School.

- Carle Place Middle/High School
- Cherry Lane School
- Rushmore Avenue School

=== Center Moriches Union Free School District ===
- Center Moriches High School
- Center Moriches Middle School
- Clayton Huey Elementary School

=== Central Islip Union Free School District ===
- Cordello Avenue Elementary School
- Central Islip Senior High School
- Andrew T. Morrow School
- Central Islip Early Childhood Center
- Charles A. Mulligan School
- Francis J. O'Neill School
- Marguerite L. Mulvey School
- Ralph Reed School

=== Cold Spring Harbor Central School District ===
- Cold Spring Harbor Junior-Senior High School
- Goosehill Primary Center
- Lloyd Harbor School
- West Side School

=== Commack School District ===
- Commack Middle School
- Commack High School
- Burr Intermediate School
- Indian Hollow School
- North Ridge School
- Rolling Hills School
- Sawmill Intermediate School
- Wood Park School

=== Comsewogue Union Free School District ===
- John F. Kennedy Middle School
- Comsewogue High School
- Norwood Avenue School
- Terryville Road School
- Boyle Road Elementary School
- Clinton Avenue School

=== Connetquot Central School District ===
- Helen B. Duffield Elementary School
- Edith L. Slocum Elementary School
- Cherokee Street Elementary School
- Idle Hour Elementary School
- John Pearl Elementary School
- Sycamore Avenue Elementary School
- Bosti Elementary School
- Ronkonkoma Middle School
- Oakdale-Bohemia Middle School
- Connetquot High School
- Arthur Premm Learning Center

=== Copiague Union Free School District ===
- Copiague Middle School
- Walter G. O'Connell Copiague High School
- Deauville Gardens Elementary School
- Great Neck Road Elementary School
- Susan E. Wiley School

== D ==
=== Deer Park Union Free School District ===
- Deer Park High School
- John Quincy Adams Elementary School
- May Moore Elementary School
- Robert Frost Middle School
- John F. Kennedy Intermediate School

== E ==
=== East Hampton Union Free School District ===
- East Hampton Middle School
- East Hampton High School
- John M. Marshall Elementary School

=== East Islip Union Free School District ===
- East Islip High School
- Connetquot Elementary School
- Early Childhood Center
- East Islip Middle School
- John F. Kennedy Elementary School
- Ruth C. Kinney Elementary School
- Timber Point Elementary School

=== East Meadow Union Free School District ===
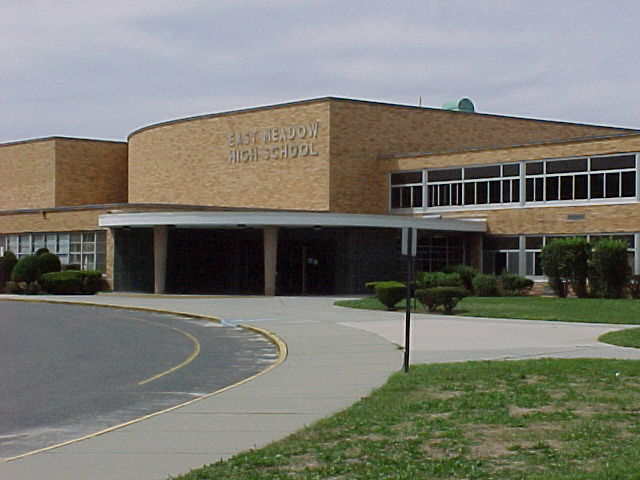
The front of East Meadow High School.

- Clarke Middle School
- W. Tresper Clarke High School
- Barnum Woods School
- Bowling Green School
- East Meadow High School
- Mcvey Elementary School
- Meadowbrook Elementary School
- Parkway School
- Woodland Middle School

=== East Moriches Union Free School District ===
- East Moriches School
- East Moriches Elementary School

=== East Quogue Union Free School District ===
- East Quogue Elementary School

=== East Rockaway Union Free School District ===
- Centre Avenue Elementary School
- East Rockaway Junior-Senior High School
- Rhame Avenue Elementary School

=== East Williston Union Free School District ===
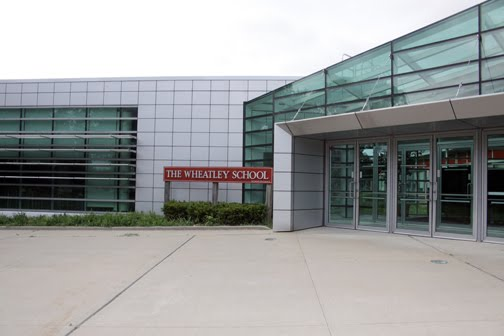
The main entrance to the Wheatley School.

- North Side Elementary School
- Willets Road Middle School
- The Wheatley School

=== Eastport-South Manor Central School District ===
- Eastport-South Manor Junior-Senior High School
- Dayton Avenue School
- Eastport Elementary School
- Tuttle Avenue School
- South Street School

=== Elmont Union Free School District ===
- Alden Terrace School
- Clara H. Carlson School
- Covert Avenue School
- Dutch Broadway School
- Gotham Avenue School
- Stewart Manor School

=== Elwood Union Free School District ===
- Elwood Middle School
- John Glenn High School
- Harley Avenue Primary School
- James H. Boyd Intermediate School

== F ==
=== Farmingdale Union Free School District ===
- Albany Avenue Elementary School
- Farmingdale Senior High School
- Weldon E. Howitt Middle School
- Northside Elementary School
- Saltzman East Memorial Elementary School
- Woodward Parkway Elementary School

=== Fire Island Union Free School District ===
- Woodhull School

=== Fishers Island Union Free School District ===
- Fishers Island School

=== Floral Park-Bellerose Union Free School District ===
- Floral Park-Bellerose School
- John Lewis Childs School

=== Franklin Square Union Free School District ===
- John Street School
- Polk Street School
- Washington Street School

=== Freeport Union Free School District ===
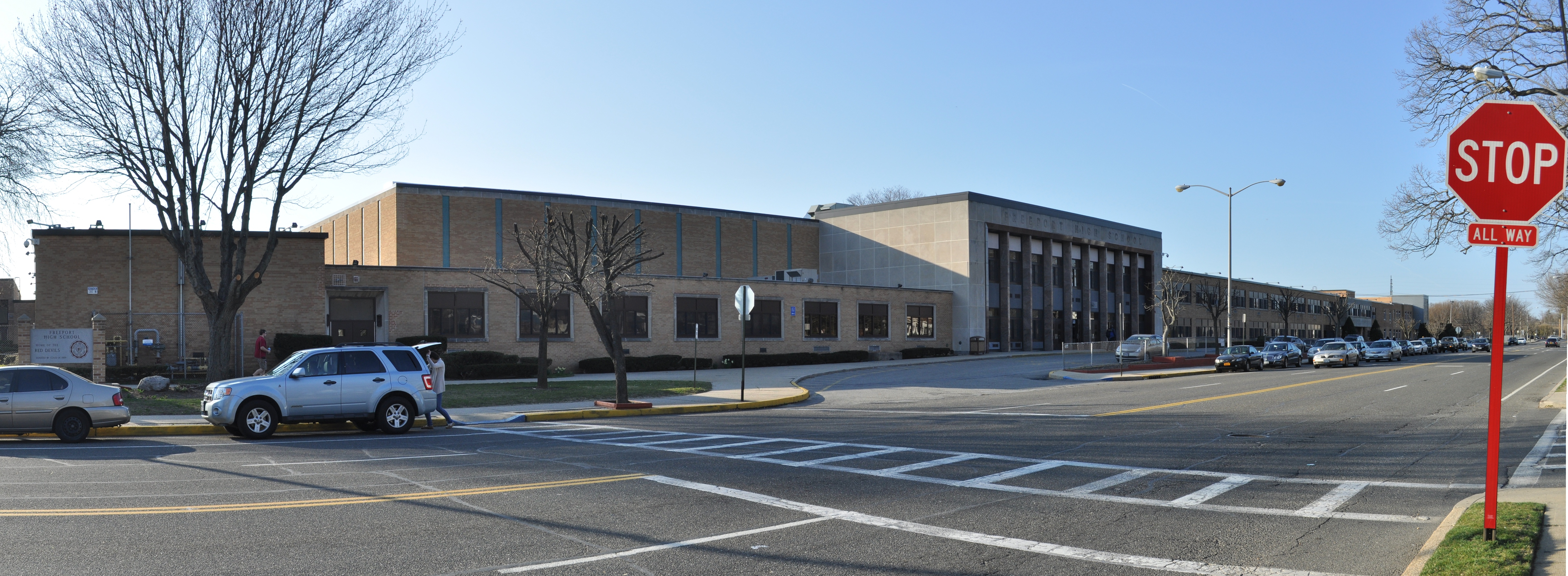
A panoramic photo of the front of Freeport High School.

- Freeport High School
- Bayview Avenue School
- John W. Dodd Middle School
- New Visions Elementary School
- Caroline G. Atkinson School
- Leo F. Giblyn School
- Archer Street School
- Columbus Avenue School

== G ==
=== Garden City Union Free School District ===
- Garden City Middle School
- Garden City High School
- Hemlock School
- Homestead School
- Locust School
- Stewart School
- Stratford Avenue School

=== Glen Cove City School District ===
- Glen Cove High School
- Glen Cove Finley Middle School
- Gribbin School
- Connolly School
- Deasy School
- Landing School

=== Great Neck Union Free School District ===
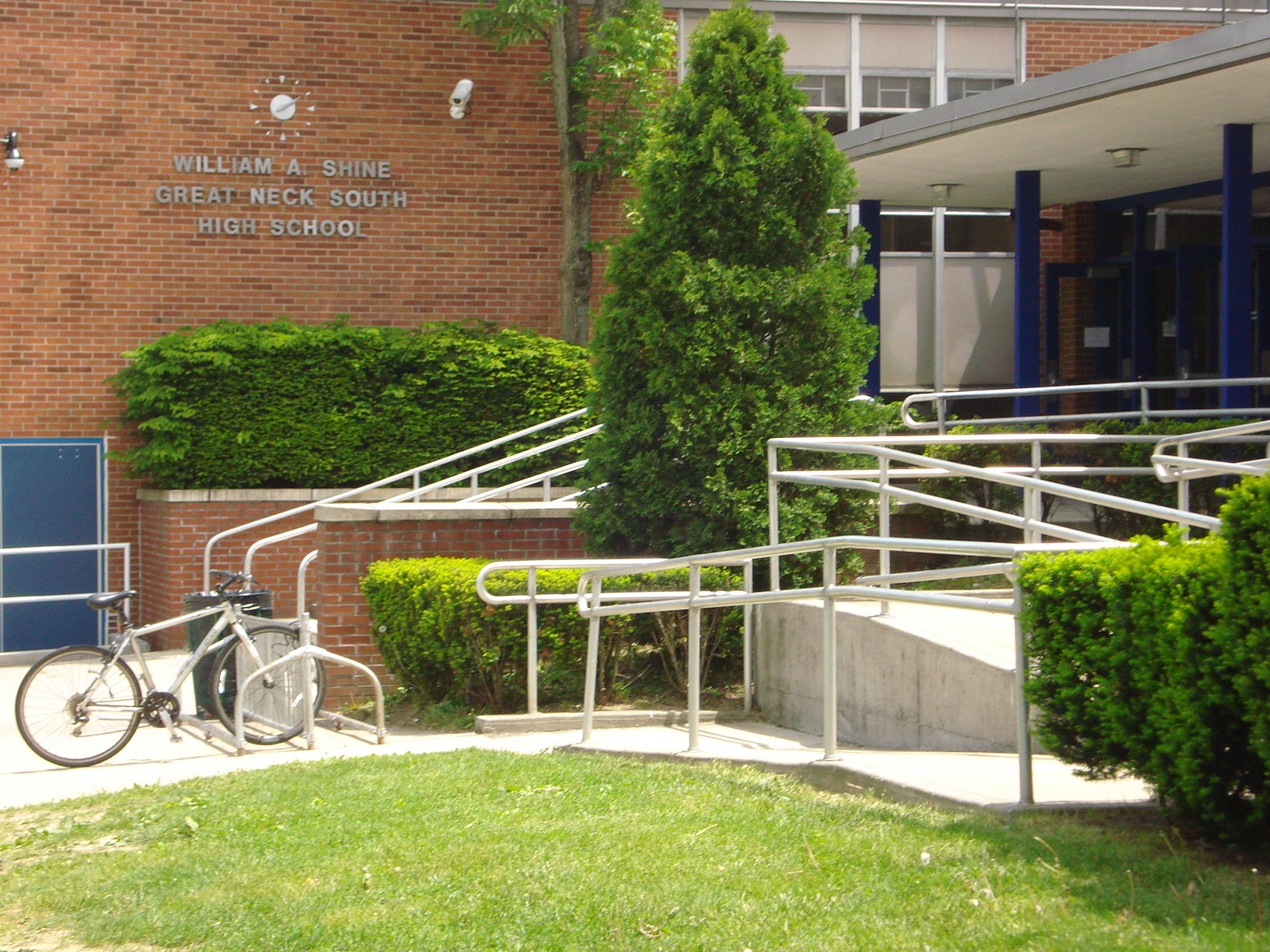
The entrance to William A. Shine Great Neck South High School.

- Great Neck North Middle School
- Great Neck South Middle School
- Great Neck South High School
- E.M. Baker School
- Great Neck North High School
- John F. Kennedy School
- Lakeville School
- Parkville Pre-K Center
- Saddle Rock School
- Great Neck Village School

=== Greenport Union Free School District ===
- Greenport High School
- Greenport Elementary School

== H ==
=== Half Hollow Hills Central School District ===
- Candlewood Middle School
- Half Hollow Hills High School East
- Half Hollow Hills High School West
- West Hollow Middle School
- Otsego Elementary School
- Chestnut Hill Elementary School
- Forest Park Elementary School
- Paumanok Elementary School
- Signal Hill Elementary School
- Sunquam Elementary School
- Vanderbilt Elementary

=== Hampton Bays School District ===
- Hampton Bays High School
- Hampton Bays Middle School
- Hampton Bays Elementary School

=== Harborfields Central School District ===
- Oldfield Middle School
- Thomas J. Lahey Elementary School
- Harborfields High School
- Washington Drive Primary School

=== Hauppauge Union Free School District ===
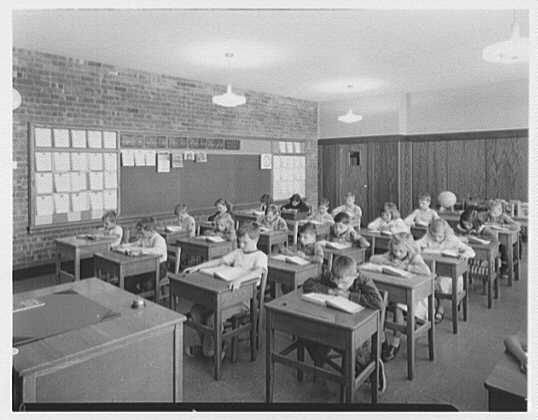
Students inside Forest Brook Elementary School in 1956.

- Hauppauge High School
- Hauppauge Middle School
- Bretton Woods Elementary School
- Forest Brook Elementary School
- Pines Elementary School

=== Hempstead Union Free School District ===
- Alverta B. Gray Schultz Middle School
- Barack Obama Elementary School
- Franklin School
- Hempstead High School
- Jackson Annex School
- David Paterson School
- Hempstead Early Childhood Center
- Jackson Main Elementary School
- Marshall School

=== Herricks Union Free School District ===
- Herricks High School
- Herricks Middle School
- Center Street School
- Denton Avenue School
- Searingtown School

=== Hewlett-Woodmere School District ===
- Woodmere Middle School
- George W. Hewlett High School
- Ogden Elementary School
- Franklin Early Childhood Center
- Hewlett Elementary School

=== Hicksville Union Free School District ===
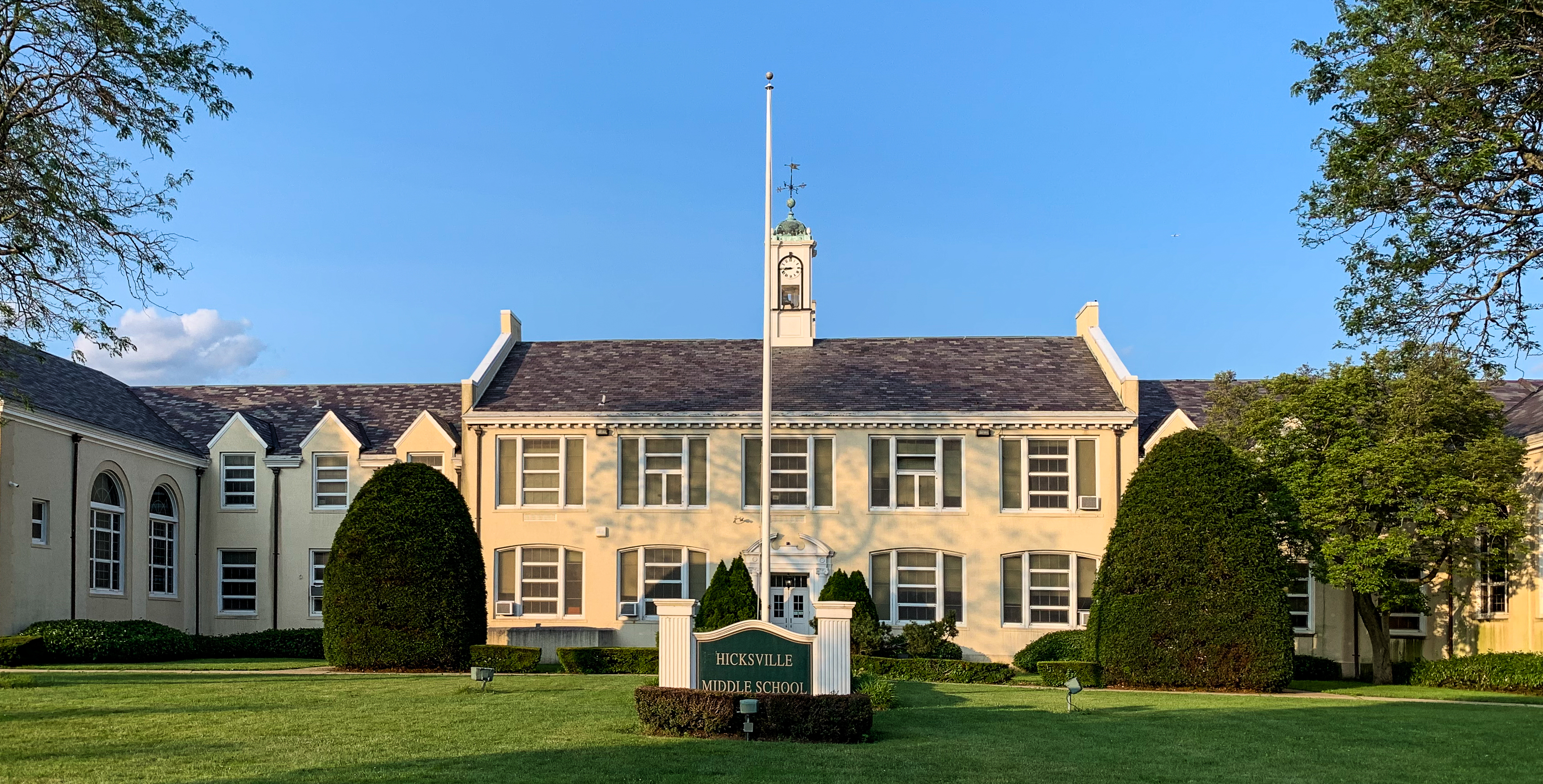
The front of Hicksville Middle School.

- Hicksville Middle School
- Hicksville High School
- Old Country Road School
- Woodland School
- Burns Avenue School
- Lee Avenue School
- Dutch Lane School
- East Street School
- Fork Lane School

=== Huntington Union Free School District ===
- Huntington High School
- Finley Middle School
- Woodhull Intermediate School
- Jack Abrams STEM Magnet School
- Flower Hill Primary School
- Jefferson Primary School
- Southdown Primary School
- Washington Primary School

== I ==
=== Island Park School District ===
- Francis X. Hegarty Elementary School
- Island Park Lincoln Orens Middle School

=== Island Trees Union Free School District ===
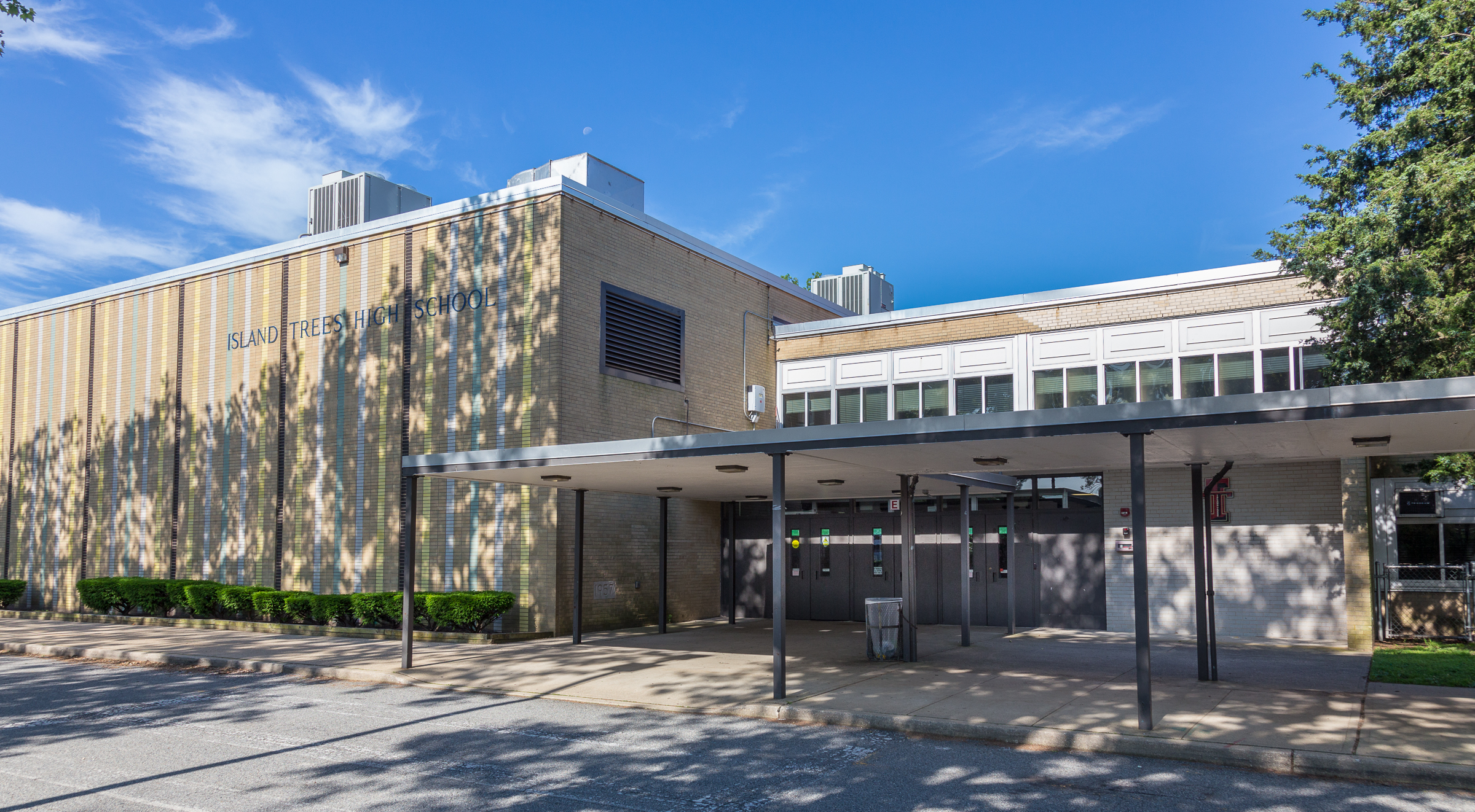
The main entrance to Island Trees High School.

- Island Trees Memorial Middle School
- Island Trees High School
- J. Fred Sparke School
- Michael F. Stokes School

=== Islip Union Free School District ===
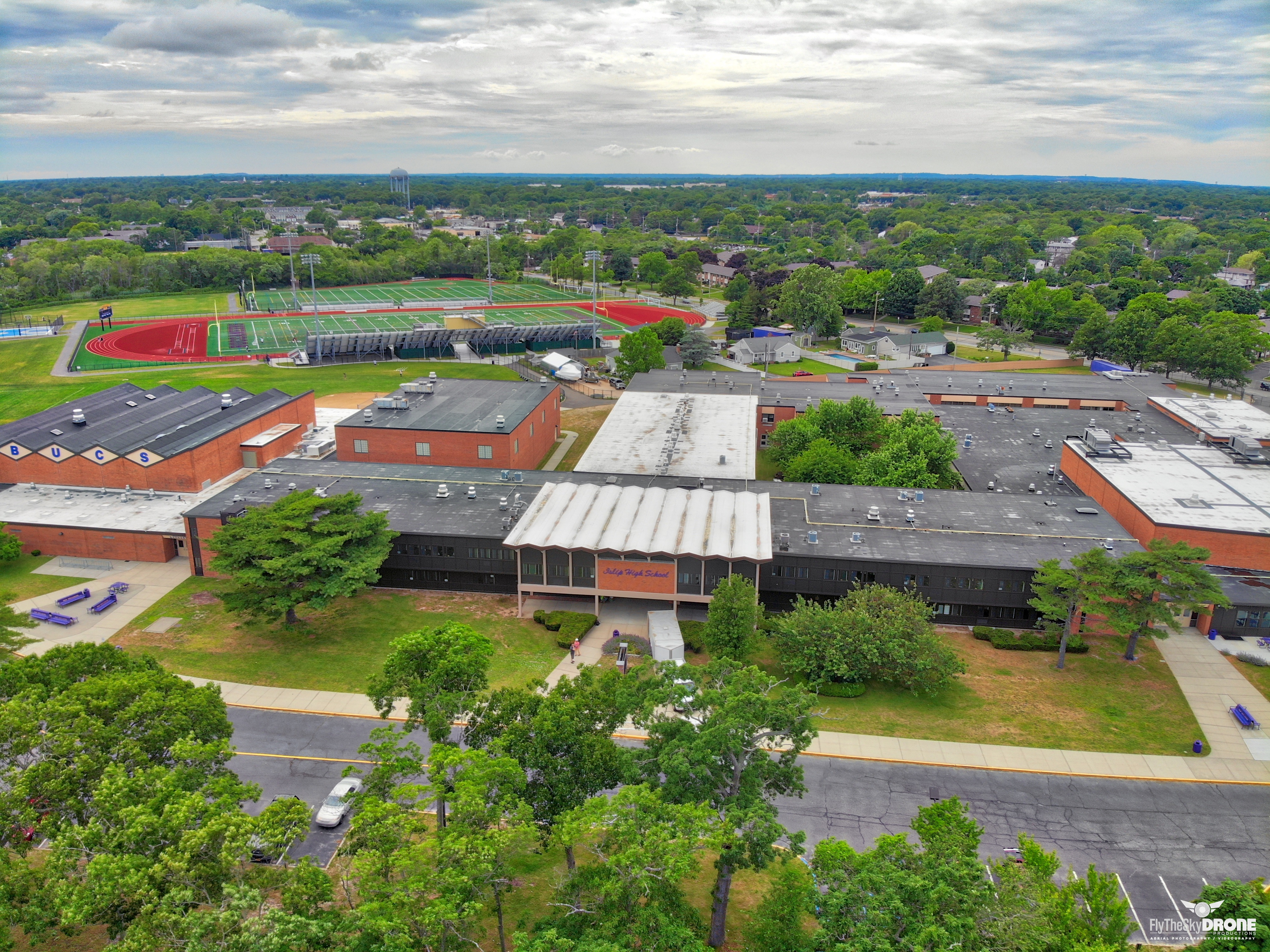
Islip High School, from above the main parking lot.

- Commack Road Elementary School
- Islip High School
- Islip Middle School
- Maud S. Sherwood Elementary School
- Wing Elementary School

== J ==
=== Jericho Union Free School District ===
- Jericho Senior High School
- Jericho Middle School
- Cantiague Elementary School
- Robert Seaman Elementary School
- Jackson Elementary School

== K ==
=== Kings Park Central School District ===
- William T. Rogers Middle School
- Kings Park High School
- Parkview Elementary School
- Fort Salonga Elementary School
- R.J.O. Intermediate School

== L ==
=== Lawrence Union Free School District ===
- School 2 (Primary)
- School 4 (UPK/Kindergarten)
- Lawrence Elementary/Middle School
- Lawrence High School

=== Levittown Union Free School District ===
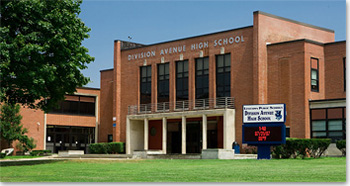
The main entrance to Division Avenue High School in Levittown, NY.

- Abbey Lane Elementary
- Division Ave. High School
- East Broadway Elementary
- Gardiners Ave. Elementary
- Jonas E. Salk Middle School
- Lee Road Elementary
- MacArthur High School
- Northside Elementary
- Summit Lane Elementary
- Wisdom Lane Middle School

=== Lindenhurst Union Free School District ===
- Lindenhurst Middle School
- Lindenhurst Senior High School
- Albany Avenue School
- Alleghany Avenue School
- Daniel Street School
- Harding Avenue School
- West Gates School
- William Rall School
- Bower School

=== Little Flower Union Free School District ===
- Little Flower School

=== Locust Valley Central School District ===
- Locust Valley Middle School
- Locust Valley High School
- Bayville Elementary School
- Locust Valley Elementary School
- Ann P. MacArthur Elementary School

=== Long Beach City School District ===
- West Elementary School
- Blackheath Pre-Kindergarten Center
- East Elementary School
- Lido Elementary School
- Lindell School
- Long Beach Middle School
- Long Beach High School
- NIKE Work Based Learning Center

=== Longwood Central School District ===
- Charles E. Walters School
- Coram Elementary School
- Ridge Elementary School
- West Middle Island School
- Longwood Middle School
- Longwood Junior High School
- Longwood High School

=== Lynbrook Union Free School District ===
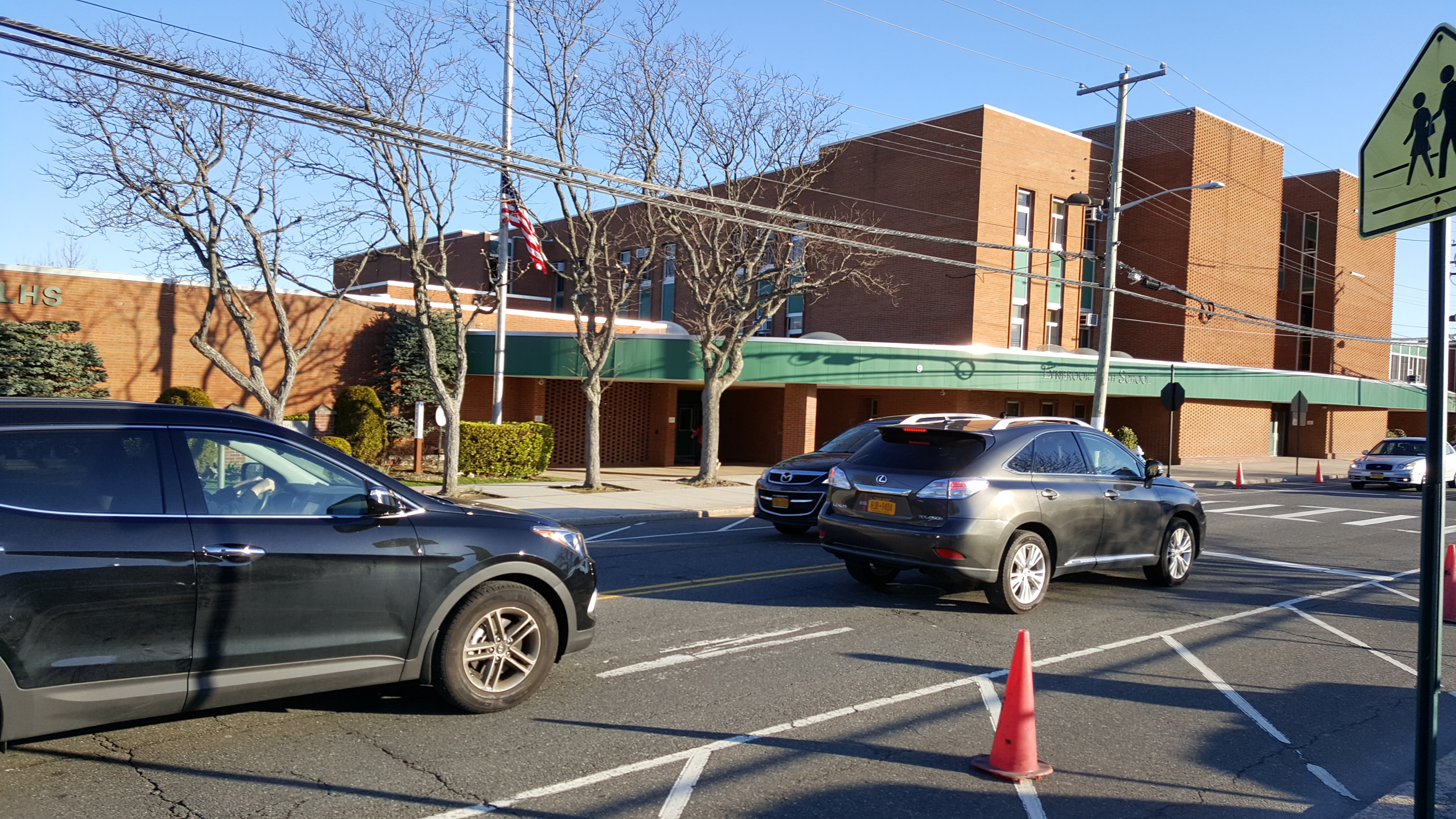
The front of Lynbrook Senior High School.

- Lynbrook North Middle School
- Lynbrook Senior High School
- Lynbrook South Middle School
- Kindergarten Center At Atlantic Avenue
- Marion Street School
- Waverly Park School
- West End School

== M ==
=== Malverne Union Free School District ===
- Malverne Senior High School
- Howard T. Herber Middle School
- Davison Avenue Elementary School
- Maurice W. Downing School

=== Manhasset Union Free School District ===
- Munsey Park Elementary School
- Shelter Rock Elementary School
- Manhasset Secondary School

=== Massapequa Union Free School District ===
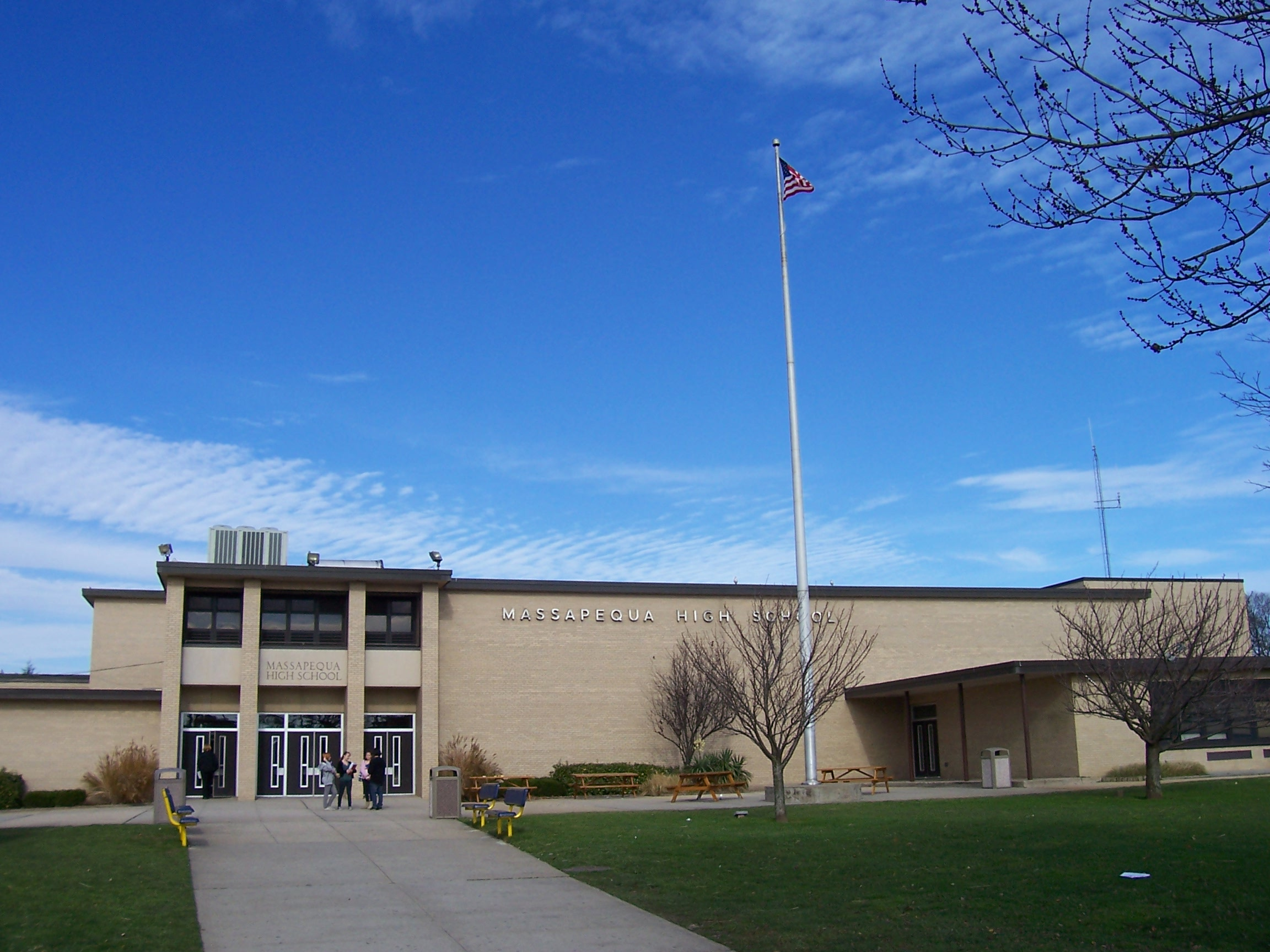
The main entrance to Massapequa High School in Massapequa, NY.

- Birch Lane Elementary
- East Lake Elementary
- Fairfield Elementary
- Lockhart Elementary
- McKenna Elementary
- Unqua Elementary
- Berner Middle School
- Massapequa High School
- Ames Campus

=== Mattituck-Cutchogue Union Free School District ===
- Cutchogue East Elementary School
- Mattituck Junior-Senior High School

=== Merrick Union Free School District ===
- Birch School
- Chatterton School
- Norman J. Levy Lakeside School

=== Middle Country Central School District ===
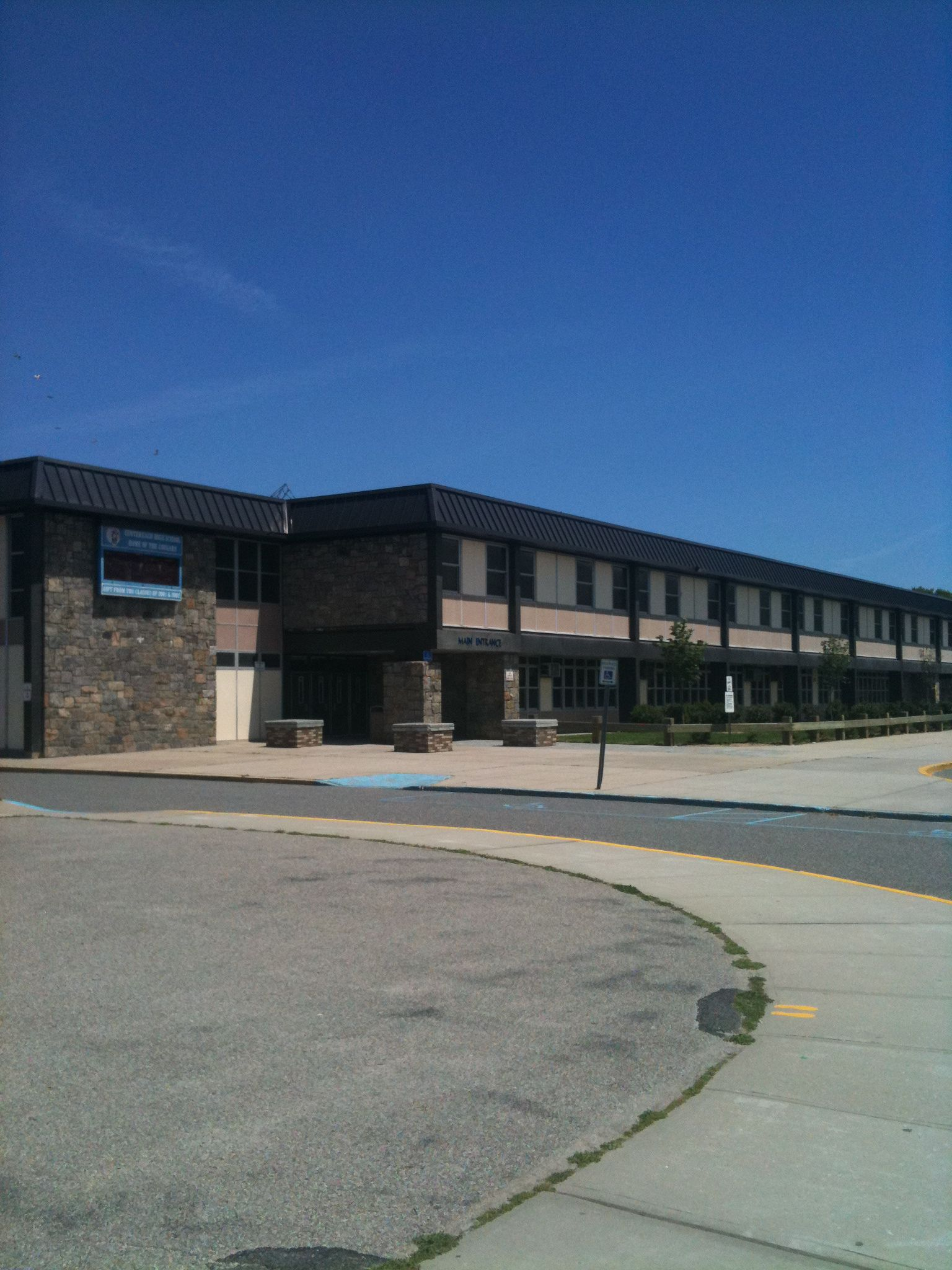
The main entrance to Centereach High School.

- Bicycle Path Pre-K Center
- Eugene Auer Memorial School
- Hawkins Path School
- Holbrook Road School
- Jericho Elementary School
- New Lane Memorial Elementary School
- North Coleman Road School
- Oxhead Road School
- Stagecoach School
- Unity Drive Pre-K Center
- Selden Middle School
- Dawnwood Middle School
- Centereach High School
- Newfield High School

=== Miller Place Union Free School District ===
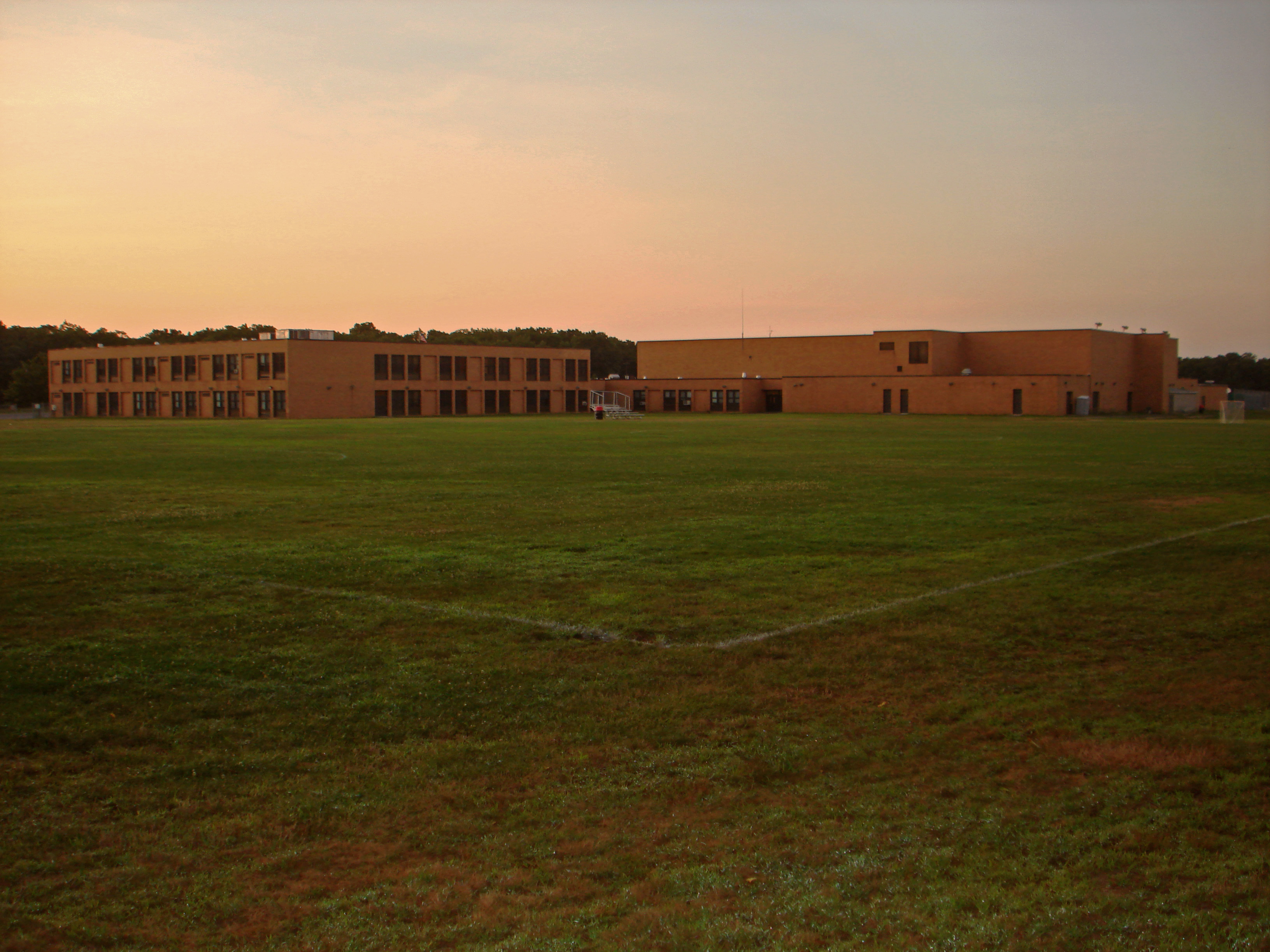
The rear of Miller Place High School, as viewed from a district athletic field.

- Miller Place High School
- North Country Road School
- Andrew Muller Primary School
- Sound Beach School

=== Mineola Union Free School District ===
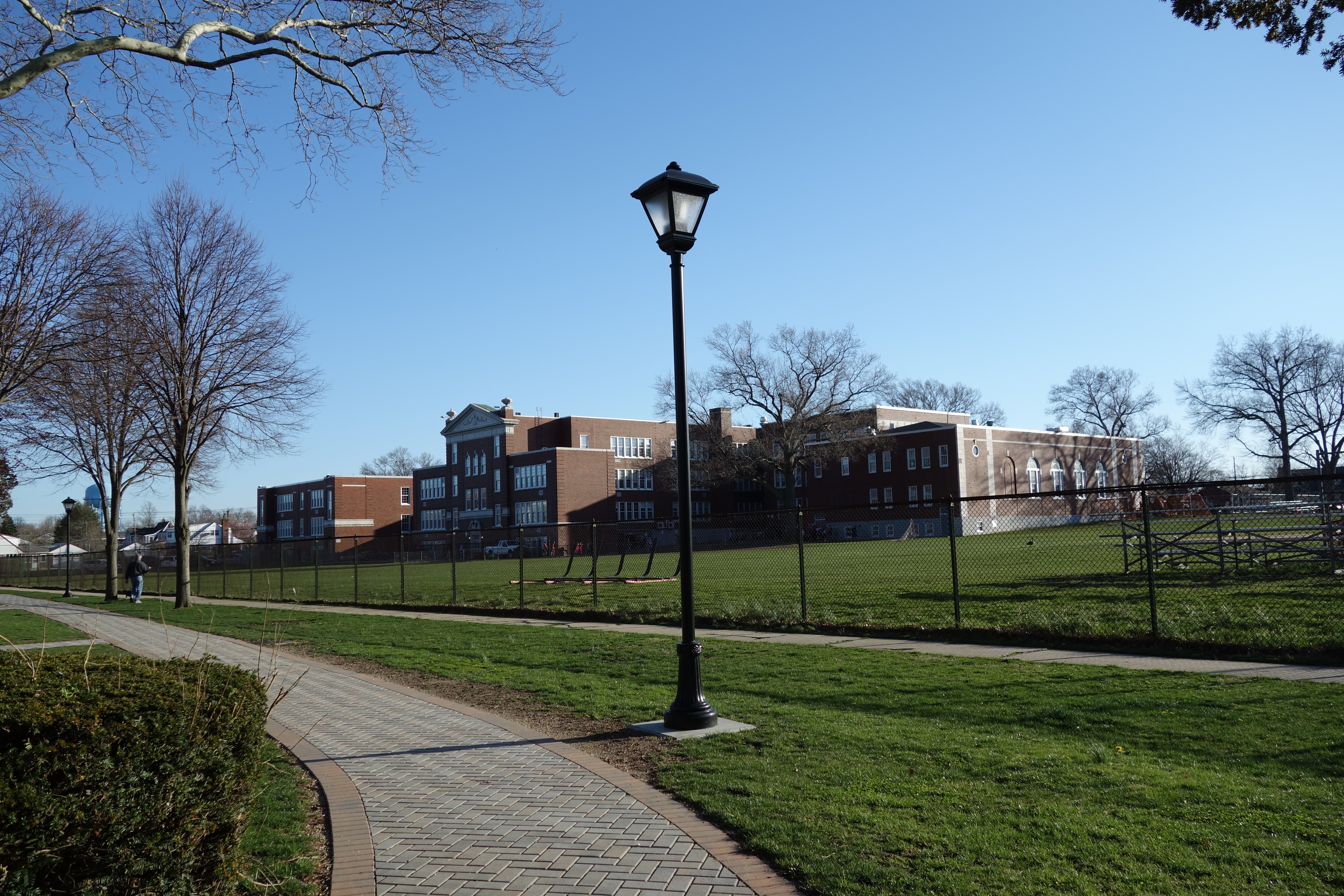
Mineola Middle School, as seen from Mineola Memorial Park.

- Mineola Middle School
- Mineola High School
- Cross Street School
- Hampton Street School
- Jackson Avenue School
- Meadow Drive School
- Willis Avenue School

=== Montauk Union Free School District ===
- Montauk School

=== Mount Sinai Union Free School District ===
- Mount Sinai Elementary School
- Mount Sinai Middle School
- Mount Sinai High School

== N ==
=== New Hyde Park-Garden City Park Union Free School District ===
- Garden City Park School
- Hillside Grade School
- Manor Oaks William Bowie School
- New Hyde Park Road School

=== New Suffolk Common School District ===
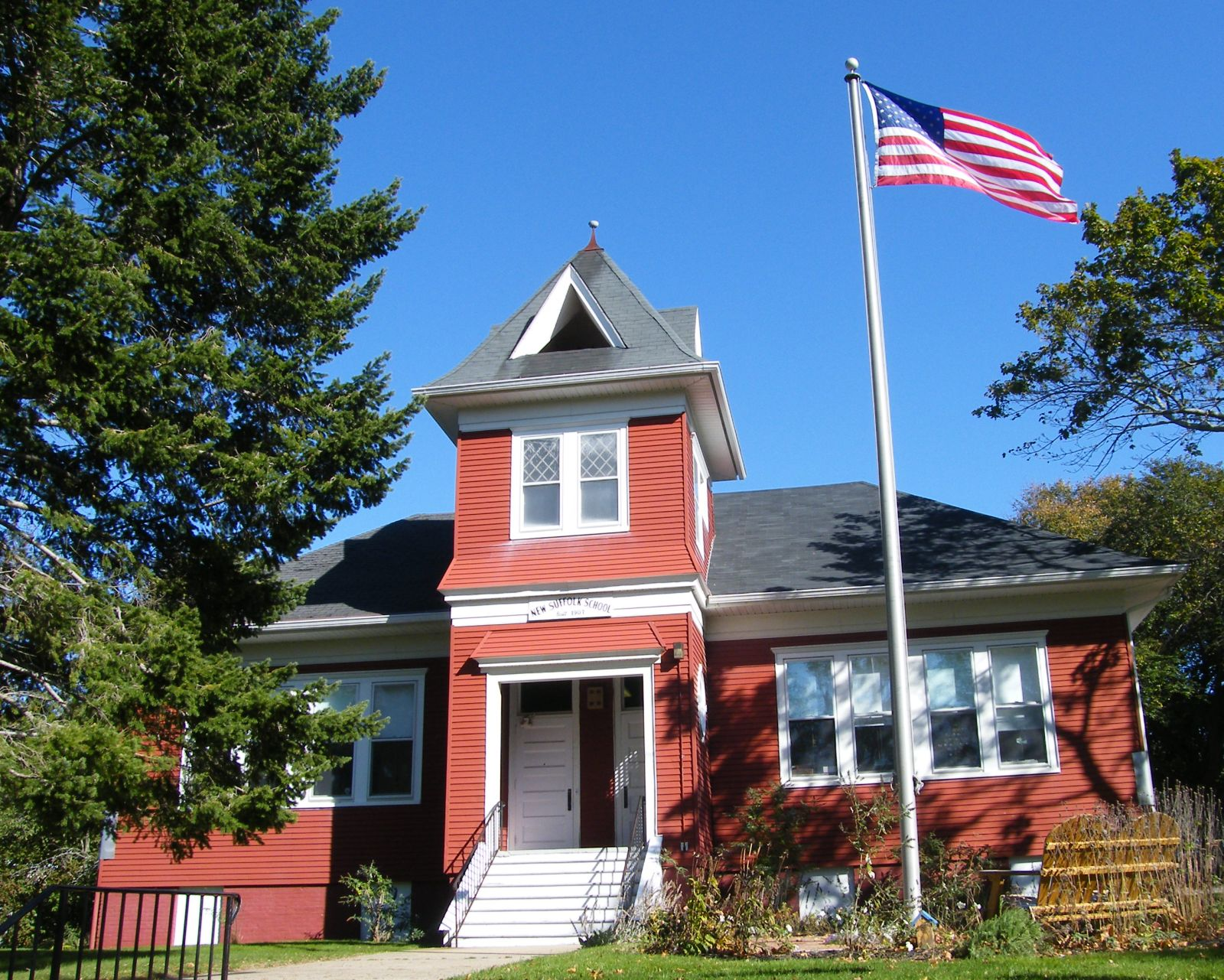
The New Suffolk School, which is listed on the National Register of Historic Places.

- New Suffolk School

=== North Babylon Union Free School District ===
- Woods Road Elementary School
- Belmont Elementary School
- Parliament Place School
- Marion G. Vedder Elementary School
- William E. DeLuca Elementary School
- Robert Moses Middle School
- North Babylon High School

=== North Bellmore Union Free School District ===
- John G. Dinkelmeyer School
- Martin Avenue Elementary School
- Newbridge Road School
- Park Avenue School
- Saw Mill Road School

=== North Merrick Union Free School District ===
- Camp Avenue School
- Harold D. Fayette School
- Old Mill Road School

=== North Shore Central School District ===
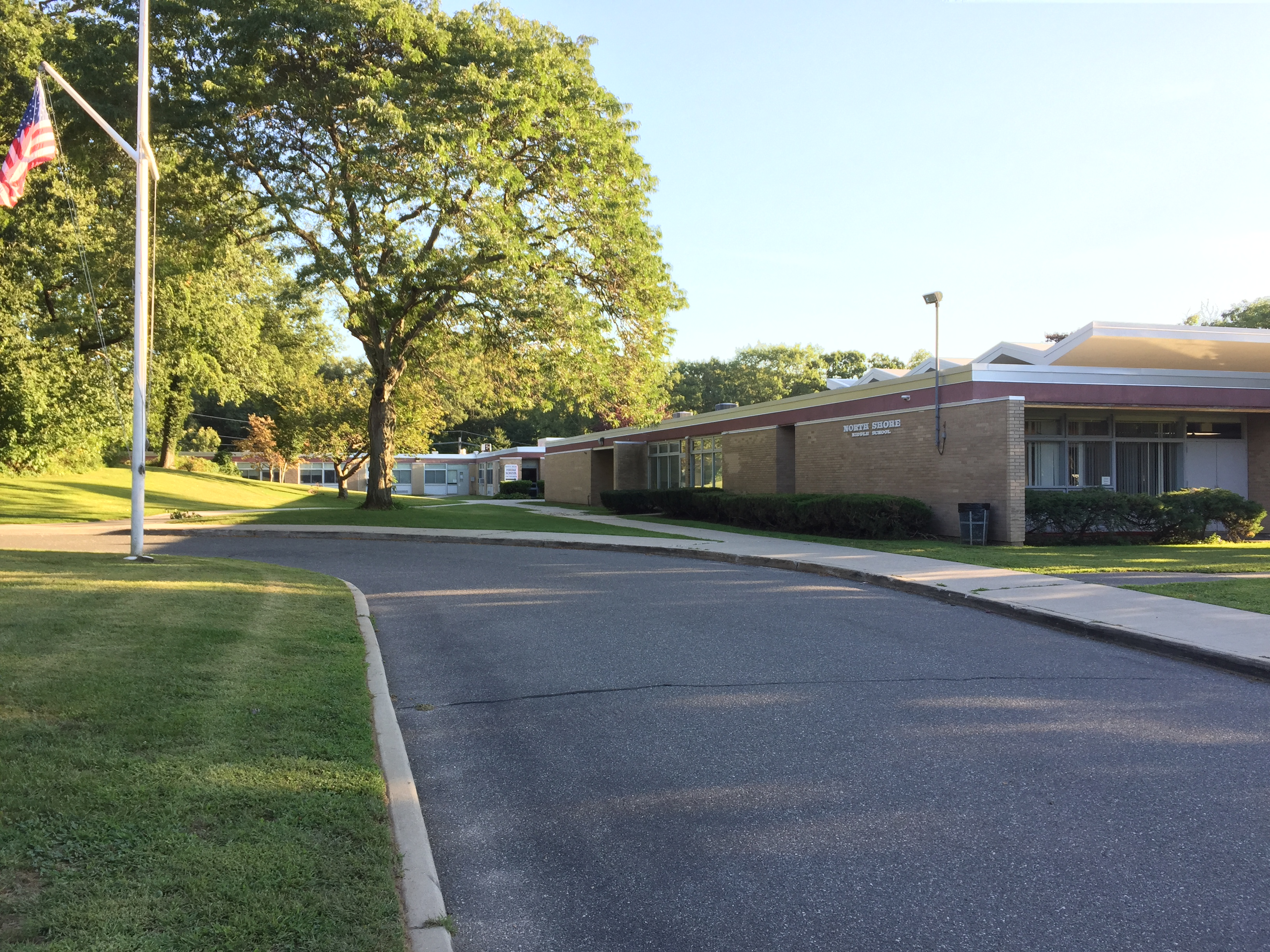
North Shore Middle School, as seen in 2015.

- Glen Head Elementary School
- Glenwood Landing Elementary School
- Sea Cliff Elementary School
- North Shore Middle School
- North Shore Senior High School

=== Northport-East Northport Union Free School District ===
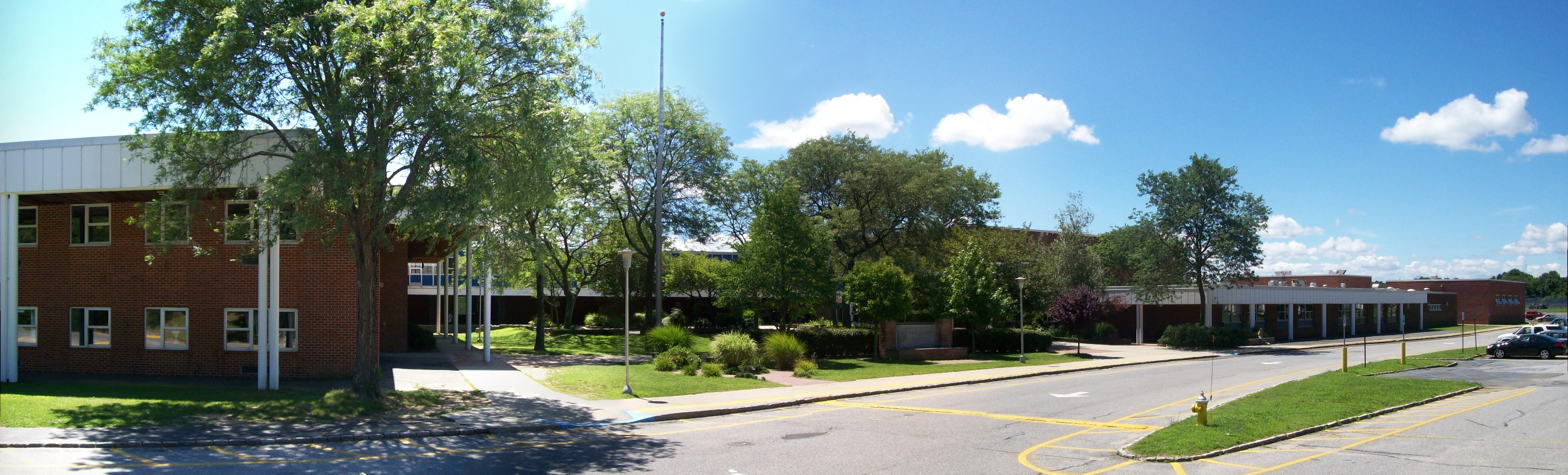
Northport Senior High School, as seen from Laurel Hill Road.

- Bellerose Avenue Elementary School
- Dickinson Avenue Elementary School
- Fifth Avenue Elementary School
- Norwood Avenue School
- Ocean Avenue School
- Pulaski Road School
- East Northport Middle School
- Northport Middle School
- Northport Senior High School

== O ==
=== Oceanside School District ===
- School 2
- School 3
- School 4
- School 5
- School 6-Kindergarten Center
- School 8
- Boardman Elementary School
- Oceanside Middle School
- Oceanside Senior High School

=== Oyster Bay-East Norwich Central School District ===
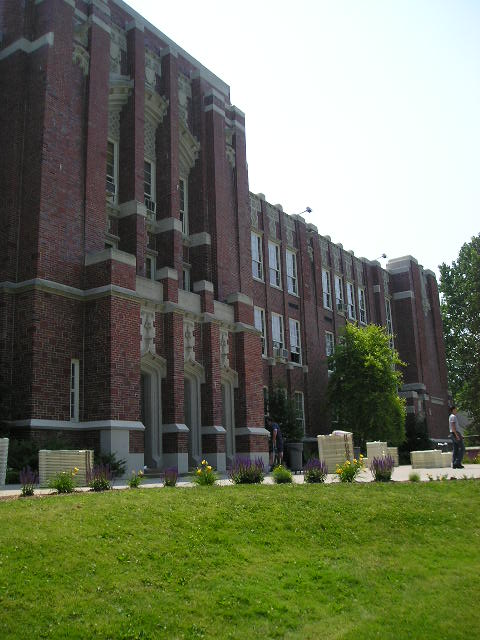
The front of Oyster Bay High School.

- Theodore Roosevelt School
- Vernon School
- Oyster Bay High School

=== Oysterponds Union Free School District ===
- Oysterponds Elementary School

== P ==
=== Patchogue-Medford Union Free School District ===
- Patchogue-Medford High School
- Patchogue High School
- Seton Hall High School
- Saxton Middle School
- South Ocean Middle School
- Oregon Middle School
- Canaan Elementary School
- Barton Elementary School
- Bay Elementary School
- Eagle Elementary School
- Medford Elementary School
- River Elementary School
- Tremont Elementary School

=== Plainedge Union Free School District ===
- Charles E. Schwarting School
- Eastplain School
- John H. West School
- Plainedge Middle School
- Plainedge Senior High School

=== Plainview-Old Bethpage Central School District ===
- Plainview-Old Bethpage Kindergarten Center
- Old Bethpage Grade School
- Parkway Elementary School
- Pasadena Elementary School
- Stratford Road Elementary School
- Howard B. Mattlin Middle School
- Plainview-Old Bethpage Middle School
- Plainview-Old Bethpage John F. Kennedy High School

=== Port Jefferson Union Free School District ===
- Port Jefferson Middle School
- Earl L. Vandermeulen High School
- Edna Louise Spear Elementary School

=== Port Washington Union Free School District ===
- Guggenheim Elementary School
- John J. Daly Elementary School
- John Philip Sousa Elementary School
- Manorhaven Elementary School
- South Salem Elementary School
- Carrie Palmer Weber Middle School
- Paul D. Schreiber Senior High School

== Q ==
=== Quogue Union Free School District ===
- Quogue Elementary School

== R ==
=== Remsenburg-Speonk Union Free School District ===
- Remsenburg-Speonk Elementary School

=== Riverhead Central School District ===
- Pulaski Street Elementary School
- Riverhead Middle School
- Aquebogue Elementary School
- Phillips Avenue School
- Riverhead Senior High School
- Riley Avenue School
- Roanoke Avenue School

=== Rockville Centre Union Free School District ===
- William S. Covert Elementary School
- Jennie E. Hewitt Elementary School
- Riverside Elementary School
- Floyd B. Watson Elementary School
- Francis F. Wilson Elementary School
- South Side Middle School
- South Side High School

=== Rocky Point Union Free School District ===
- Rocky Point Middle School
- Rocky Point High School
- Joseph A. Edgar Intermediate School
- Frank J. Carasiti Elementary School

=== Roosevelt Union Free School District ===
- Roosevelt High School
- Centennial Avenue School
- Ulysses Byas Elementary School
- Roosevelt Middle School
- Washington Rose School

=== Roslyn Union Free School District ===
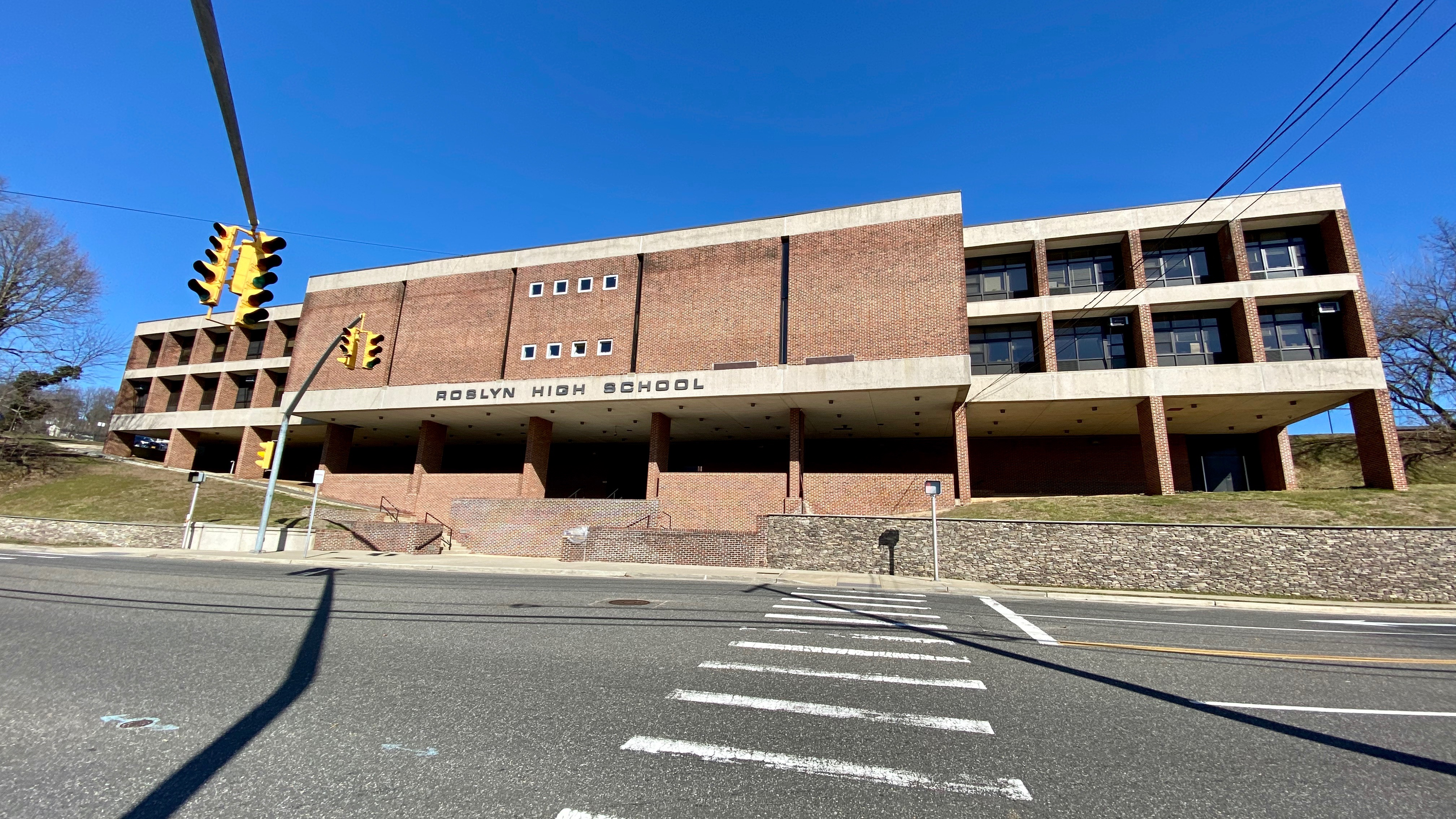
Roslyn High School, as seen from the intersection of Roslyn Road and Lincoln Avenue.

- Heights School
- Harbor Hill Elementary School
- Roslyn Middle School
- Roslyn High School

== S ==
=== Sachem Central School District ===
- Samoset Middle School
- Seneca Middle School
- Sagamore Middle School
- Sequoya High School
- Sachem High School East
- Wenonah School
- Lynwood Elementary School
- Sachem High School North
- Cayuga School
- Chippewa Elementary School
- Gatelot Avenue School
- Grundy Avenue School
- Hiawatha School
- Merrimac School
- Nokomis School
- Tamarac Elementary School
- Tecumseh Elementary School
- Waverly Avenue School

=== Sag Harbor Union Free School District ===
- Pierson Middle-High School
- Sag Harbor Elementary School

=== Sagaponack Common School District ===
- Sagaponack School

=== Sayville Union Free School District ===
- Sayville High School
- Lincoln Avenue Elementary School
- Sayville Middle School
- Cherry Avenue Elementary School
- Sunrise Drive Elementary School

=== Seaford Union Free School District ===
- Seaford Middle School
- Seaford High School
- Seaford Harbor School
- Seaford Manor School

=== Sewanhaka Central High School District ===
- Elmont Memorial High School
- Floral Park Memorial High School
- Sewanhaka High School
- H. Frank Carey Junior/Senior High School
- New Hyde Park Memorial High School

=== Shelter Island Union Free School District ===
- Shelter Island School

=== Shoreham-Wading River Central School District ===
- Shoreham-Wading River High School
- Albert G. Prodell Middle School
- Miller Avenue School
- Wading River Elementary School

=== Smithtown Central School District ===
- Great Hollow Middle School
- Smithtown High School East
- Smithtown High School West
- Nesaquake Middle School
- Tackan Elementary School
- Accompsett Middle School
- Branch Brook Elementary School
- Dogwood Elementary School
- Mills Pond Elementary School
- Mount Pleasant Elementary School
- Nesconset Elementary School
- Saint James Elementary School
- Smithtown Elementary School
- Accompsett Elementary School

=== South Country Central School District ===
- Kreamer Street Elementary School
- Verne W. Critz Elementary School
- Bellport Middle School
- Bellport High School
- Brookhaven Elementary School
- Frank P. Long Intermediate School
- Southaven Academy

=== South Huntington Union Free School District ===
- Birchwood Intermediate School
- Countrywood Primary Center
- Silas Wood 6th Grade Center
- Henry L. Stimson Middle School
- Maplewood Intermediate School
- Oakwood Primary Center
- Walt Whitman High School

=== Southampton Union Free School District ===
- Southampton Senior High School
- Southampton Intermediate School
- Southampton Elementary School

=== Southold Union Free School District ===
- Southold Junior-Senior High School
- Southold Elementary School

=== Springs Union Free School District ===
- Springs School

=== Syosset Central School District ===
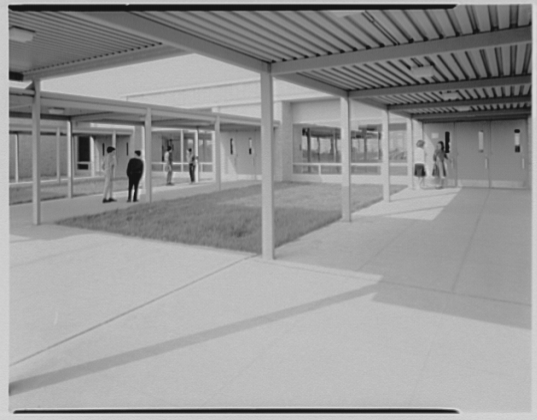
Students congregated at the main entrance to Harry B. Thompson Middle School in 1962.

- Harry B. Thompson Middle School
- Syosset High School
- Baylis Elementary School
- Berry Hill Elementary School
- Robbins Lane Elementary School
- South Grove Elementary School
- South Woods Middle School
- Village Elementary School
- Walt Whitman Elementary School
- Willits Elementary School

== T ==
=== Three Village Central School District ===
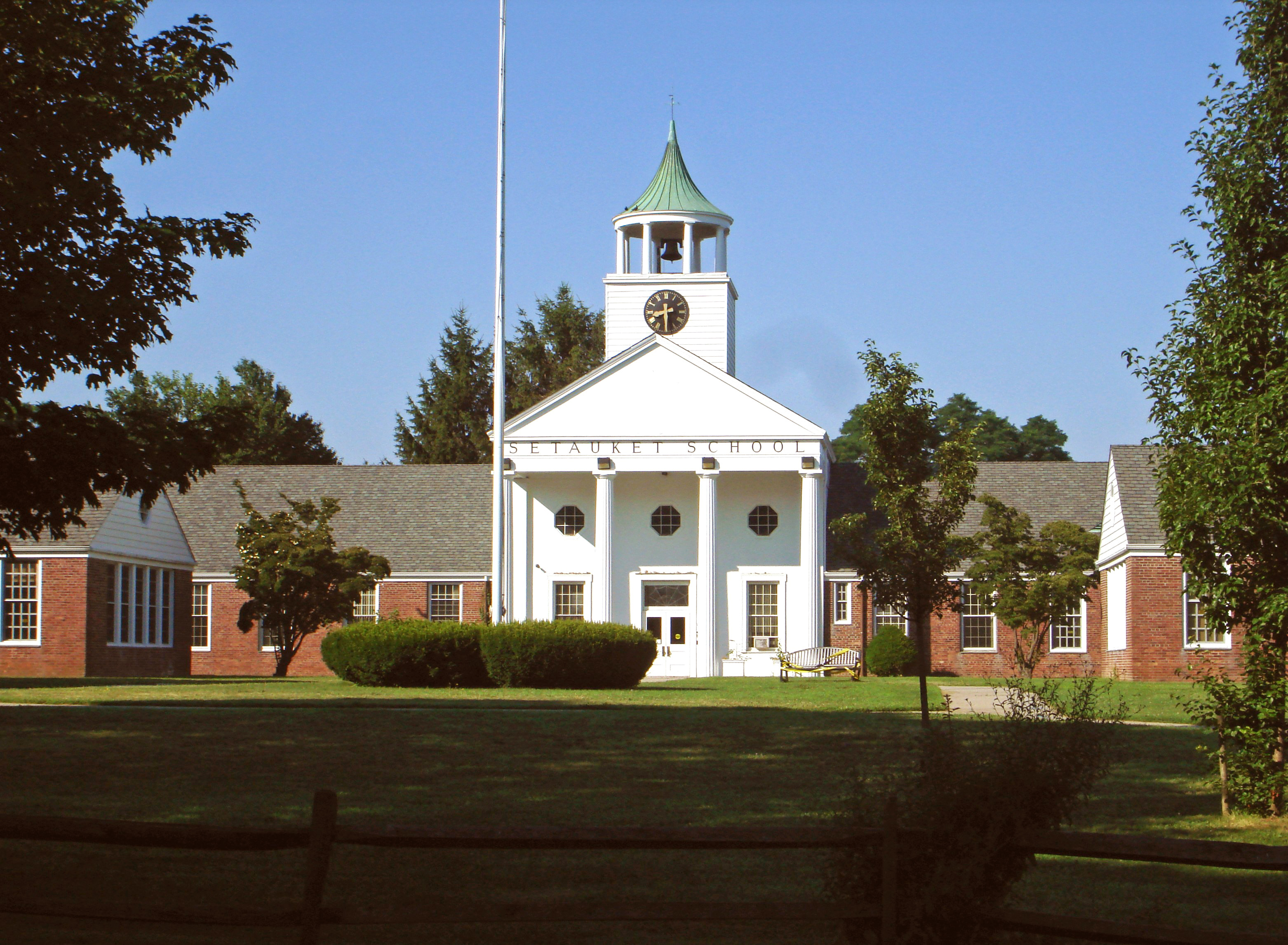
The front of Setauket Elementary School.

- Ward Melville High School
- Arrowhead Elementary School
- Minnesauke Elementary School
- Nassakeag Elementary School
- Paul J. Gelinas Junior High School
- Robert Cushman Murphy Junior High School
- Setauket Elementary School
- William Sidney Mount School

=== Tuckahoe Common School District ===
- Tuckahoe School

== U ==
=== Uniondale Union Free School District ===
- California Avenue Elementary School
- Grand Avenue Elementary School
- Smith Street Elementary School
- Walnut Street Elementary School
- Lawrence Road Middle School
- Northern Parkway Elementary School
- Turtle Hook Middle School
- Uniondale High School

== V ==
=== Valley Stream 13 Union Free School District ===
- Howell Road School
- James A. Dever School
- Wheeler Avenue School
- Willow Road School

=== Valley Stream 24 Union Free School District ===
- Brooklyn Avenue School
- William L. Buck School
- Robert W. Carbonaro School

=== Valley Stream 30 Union Free School District ===
- Clearstream Avenue School
- Forest Road School
- Shaw Avenue School

=== Valley Stream Central High School District ===
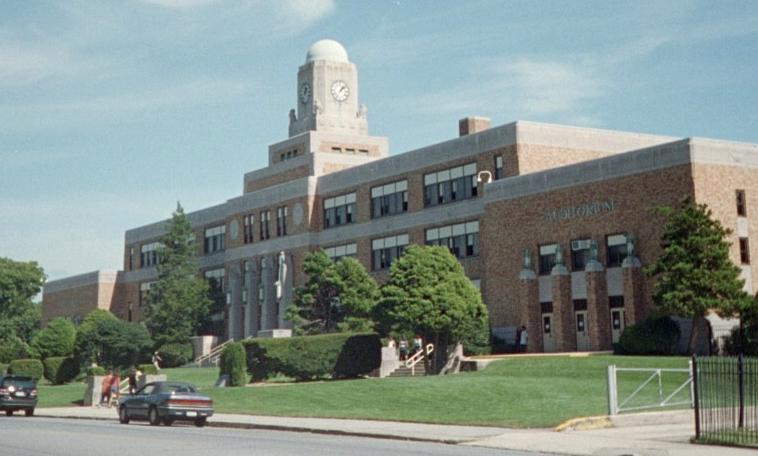
The front of Valley Stream Central High School.

- Valley Stream Central High School
- Valley Stream Memorial Junior High School
- Valley Stream North High School
- Valley Stream South High School

== W ==
=== Wainscott Common School District ===
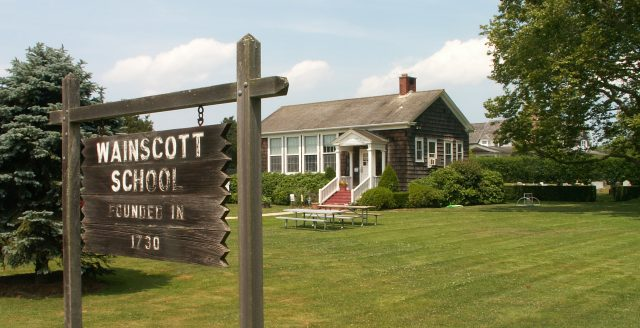
The Wainscott School.

- Wainscott School

=== Wantagh Union Free School District ===
- Wantagh Senior High School
- Forest Lake School
- Mandalay School
- Wantagh Middle School
- Wantagh Elementary School

=== West Babylon Union Free School District ===
- West Babylon Senior High School
- Santapogue School
- Forest Avenue School
- John F. Kennedy School
- South Bay School
- Tooker Avenue School
- West Babylon Junior High School

=== West Hempstead Union Free School District ===
- Cornwell Avenue School
- West Hempstead Secondary School
- George Washington School
- Chestnut Street School

=== West Islip Union Free School District ===
- Bayview Elementary School
- Oquenock Elementary School
- Udall Road Middle School
- Beach Street Middle School
- Manetuck Elementary School
- Paul J. Bellew Elementary School
- West Islip High School

=== Westbury Union Free School District ===
- Westbury Middle School
- Drexel Avenue School
- Westbury High School
- Dryden Street School
- Park Avenue School
- Powells Lane School

=== Westhampton Beach Union Free School District ===
- Westhampton Beach Middle School
- Westhampton Beach Elementary School
- Westhampton Beach Senior High School

=== William Floyd School District ===
- Tangier Smith Elementary School
- Woodhull Elementary School
- John S. Hobart Elementary School
- William Floyd Elementary School
- William Paca Middle School
- William Floyd High School

=== Wyandanch Union Free School District ===
- Milton L. Olive Middle School
- Wyandanch Memorial High School
- Martin Luther King Elementary School
