= Lenox Elementary School =

Lenox Elementary School can refer to more than one educational institution in the United States:

- A school in the Hillsboro School District in Hillsboro, Oregon
- A school in the Baldwin Union Free School District on Long Island in New York
- A former school in the St. Louis Park School District in St. Louis Park, Minnesota
