= Bethpage Union Free School District =

School district in the U.S. state of New York

Address
- 10 Cherry Ave Bethpage, New York; United States

District information
- Superintendent: David Schneider
- Schools: 5

Students and staff
- Students: 3083
- Teachers: 270.48

Other information
- Website: https://www.bethpagecommunity.com/

The Bethpage Union Free School District (BUFSD) in Bethpage, New York contains 5 schools. The boundaries of the school district include parts of some surrounding hamlets (such as Old Bethpage, Plainview, and Plainedge).

The District has a projector and computer in almost every classroom and many computer labs. There are over 3,000 students and over 280 teachers. The Superintendent of Schools is David Schneider. The Assistant Superintendent for Instruction and Technology is Michael Spence, former principal of Bethpage Senior High school. Scott Harrington is the Assistant Superintendent for Business, and Kevin Fullerton is the Assistant Superintendent for Human Resources.

== Current schools ==
- Bethpage High School, grades 9–12, was completed in 1959. Located at the intersection of Cherry Avenue and Stewart Avenue; led by Principal Nicholas Jantz.
- JFK Middle School, completed between 1950 and 1952, at one time or another has housed every grade (from K to 12). All three elementary schools feed into this one middle school, which presently has grades 6 to 8 and is under Principal Erin Hayes.
- Central Boulevard Elementary, completed 1955–1956, is run by Principal Dominique Seibert.
- Charles Campagne Elementary, completed in 1962.
- Kramer Lane Elementary, built in 1957, is within the Plainview Postal District and is run by Principal Kerri McCarthy.

== Former schools ==
- Bedelltown Elementary (first school in the area, built 1858, was at Broadway & Plainview Road, rebuilt on higher ground in 1890s at Broadway and Cherry Avenue). At the time of its founding, the school district's name was Bedelltown.
- Powell Avenue Elementary (built 1912, demolished for the 1963 construction of the Bethpage Public Library)
- Pine Avenue Elementary (built 1954, closed 1980)
- Bloomingdale Elementary (built 1959, closed 1972)

== See also ==
- List of Long Island public school districts and schools
- List of school districts in New York
- Island Trees Union Free School District
- Levittown, New York
