= Roosevelt, New York =

- Hamlet and census-designated place
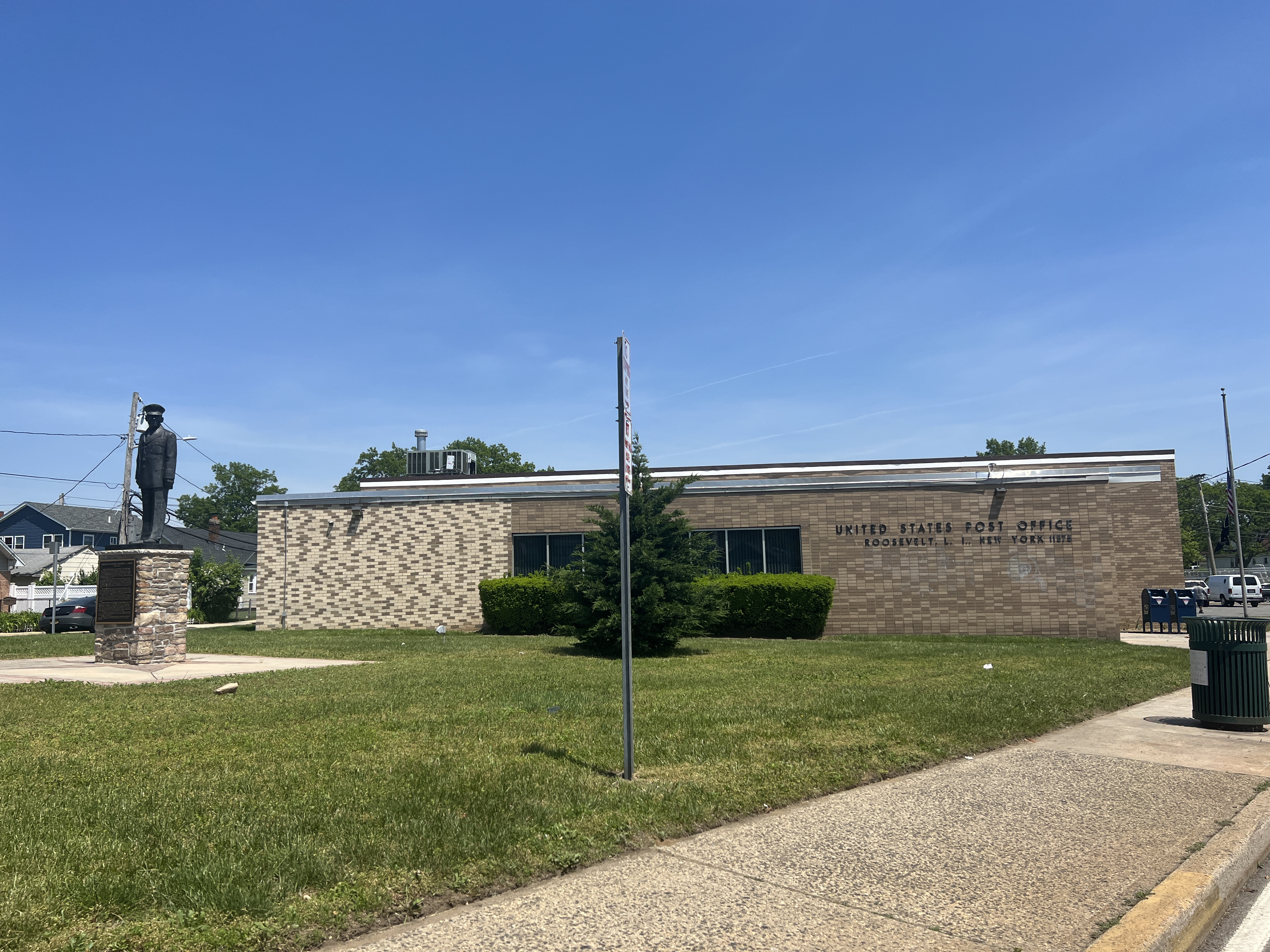
- The Roosevelt Post Office in May 2022

- Location in Nassau County and the state of New York

- Location on Long Island Location within the state of New York
- Coordinates: 40°40′45″N 73°35′8″W
- Country: United States
- State: New York
- County: Nassau
- Town: Hempstead
- Named after: Theodore Roosevelt

Area
  - Total: 1.78 sq mi (4.61 km^{2})
  - Land: 1.77 sq mi (4.58 km^{2})
  - Water: 0.012 sq mi (0.03 km^{2})
- Elevation: 39 ft (12 m)

Population (2020)
  - Total: 18,066
  - Density: 10,205.2/sq mi (3,940.24/km^{2})
- Time zone: UTC-5 (Eastern (EST))
  - Summer (DST): UTC-4 (EDT)
- ZIP Codes: 11575 (Roosevelt); 11520 (Freeport)
- Area codes: 516, 363
- FIPS code: 36-63506
- GNIS feature ID: 0962860

Roosevelt (historically known as Greenwich and Rum Point) is a hamlet and census-designated place (CDP) located within the Town of Hempstead in Nassau County, on the South Shore of Long Island, in New York, United States. The population was 18,066 at the time of the 2020 census.

== History ==
Historically, what is now Roosevelt was known as Greenwich and Rum Point. The name was eventually changed to Roosevelt in the first half of the 20th century.

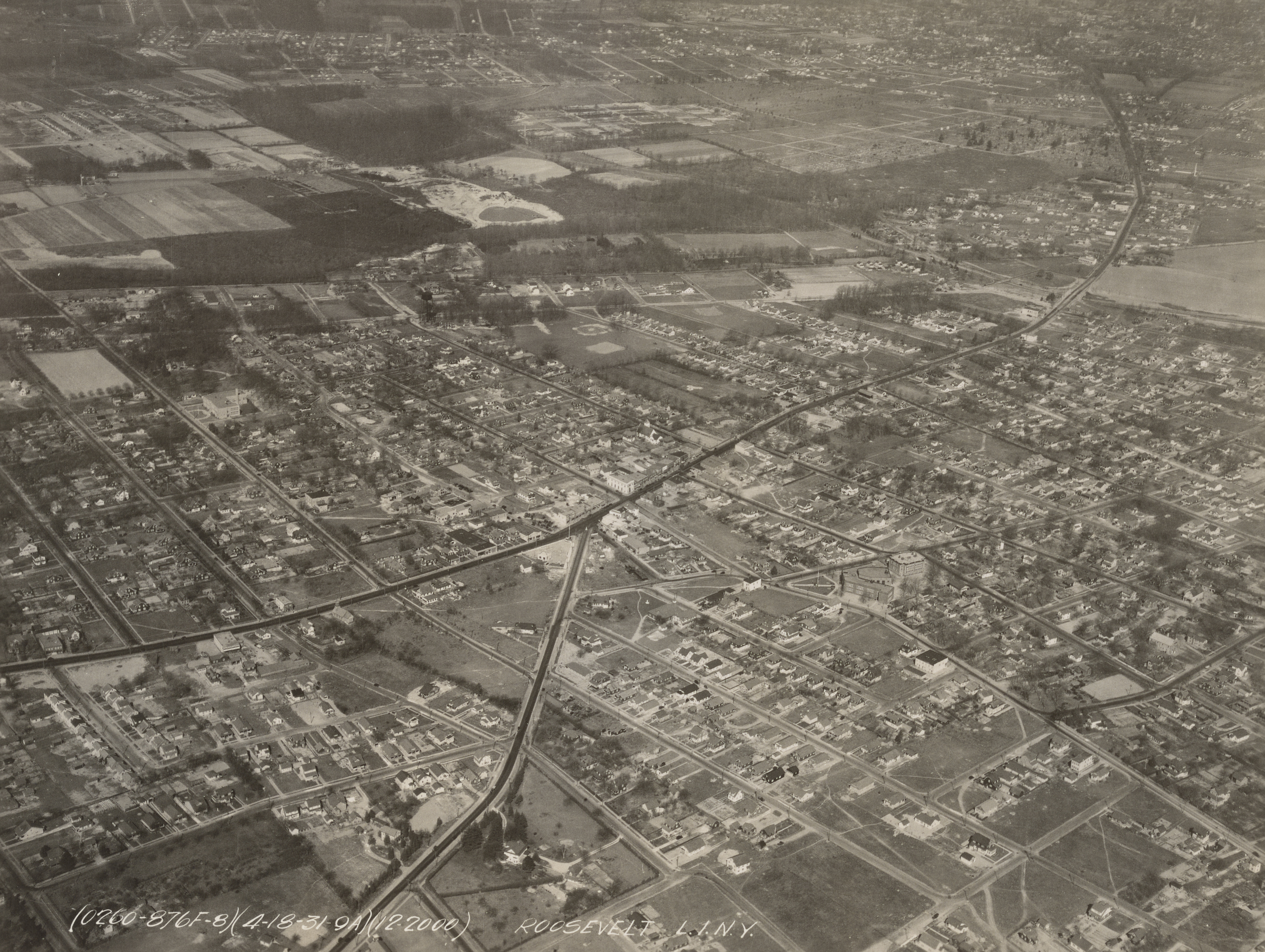
Aerial view of Roosevelt, 1931

In 1920, the short-lived Roosevelt Police District was established, to provide better law enforcement coverage in the community. Its territory was roughly coterminous with those of the Roosevelt Fire District. It was absorbed later in the decade by the Nassau County Police Department, following that agency's establishment in 1925.

While Roosevelt once had a predominantly-white population, white flight and real estate blockbusting became a major issue during the postwar housing boom in the 1950s and 1960s, when the community saw an influx of African-American residents.

In December 1950, the Town of Hempstead approved a $15,000 bond for the financing of establishing the Roosevelt Parking District – a special district intended to improve and oversee parking facilities within the community. This district was first requested by business owners in Roosevelt's business district, who wished for improved parking facilities to handle the growth of automobile traffic and increase business.

In 1961, as part of a Nassau County highway widening project along Nassau Road (Nassau County Route 7B), concerns arose that the community's World War II veterans memorial – located at that road's intersection with the Hempstead–Babylon Turnpike (Nassau County Route D11) – would be demolished as part of the project, to make room for the widened roadway. Residents, upon hearing the rumors, urged local officials to save the memorial, dedicated in 1949 and featuring the names of 830 veterans of WWII. Ultimately, Nassau County determined that September, that there would be sufficient room to widen the road without disturbing the memorial, which in turn was never demolished.

=== Etymology ===
The community is named for former President Theodore Roosevelt, but was historically also known as Greenwich and Rum Point for a time before that. Theodore Roosevelt was a Long Island resident whose Cove Neck residence, Sagamore Hill, served as his Summer White House.

== Geography ==
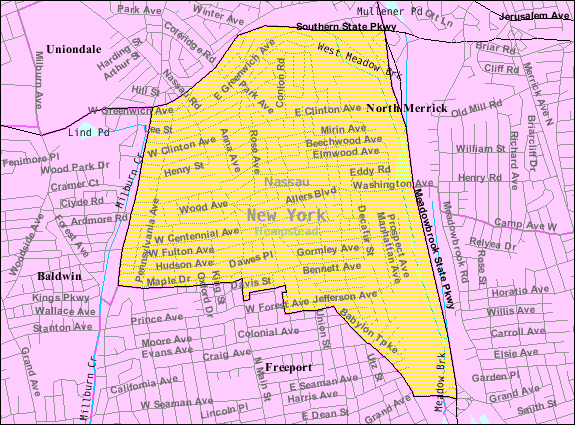
U.S. Census map of Roosevelt

According to the United States Census Bureau, the CDP has a total area of 1.8 square miles (4.6 km^{2}), of which 1.8 square miles (4.6 km^{2}) is land and 0.56% is water.

=== Climate ===
According to the Köppen climate classification, Roosevelt has a Humid subtropical climate (type Cfa) with cool, wet winters and hot, humid summers. Precipitation is uniform throughout the year, with slight spring and fall peaks.

== Demographics ==
Historical population
Census	Pop.	Note	%±
2000	15,854		—
2010	16,258		2.5%
2020	18,066		11.1%
U.S. Decennial Census; 2010 2020

=== Racial and ethnic composition ===
Roosevelt CDP, New York – Racial and ethnic composition Note: the US Census treats Hispanic/Latino as an ethnic category. This table excludes Latinos from the racial categories and assigns them to a separate category. Hispanics/Latinos may be of any race.
Race / Ethnicity (NH = Non-Hispanic)	Pop 2000	Pop 2010	Pop 2020	% 2000	% 2010	% 2020
White alone (NH)	461	326	343	2.91%	2.01%	1.90%
Black or African American alone (NH)	12,307	9,873	8,519	77.63%	60.73%	47.15%
Native American or Alaska Native alone (NH)	41	59	32	0.26%	0.36%	0.18%
Asian alone (NH)	75	85	169	0.47%	0.52%	0.94%
Native Hawaiian or Pacific Islander alone (NH)	3	5	11	0.02%	0.03%	0.06%
Other race alone (NH)	44	80	173	0.28%	0.49%	0.96%
Mixed race or Multiracial (NH)	351	282	413	2.21%	1.73%	2.29%
Hispanic or Latino (any race)	2,572	5,548	8,406	16.22%	34.12%	46.53%
Total	15,854	16,258	18,066	100.00%	100.00%	100.00%

=== 2020 census ===
As of the 2020 census, Roosevelt had a population of 18,066. The median age was 35.0 years. 24.3% of residents were under the age of 18 and 11.3% of residents were 65 years of age or older. For every 100 females there were 93.2 males, and for every 100 females age 18 and over there were 91.0 males age 18 and over.

100.0% of residents lived in urban areas, while 0.0% lived in rural areas.

There were 4,242 households in Roosevelt, of which 46.5% had children under the age of 18 living in them. Of all households, 42.1% were married-couple households, 17.1% were households with a male householder and no spouse or partner present, and 35.0% were households with a female householder and no spouse or partner present. About 14.5% of all households were made up of individuals and 6.1% had someone living alone who was 65 years of age or older.

There were 4,441 housing units, of which 4.5% were vacant. The homeowner vacancy rate was 2.0% and the rental vacancy rate was 1.6%.

Racial composition as of the 2020 census
Race	Number	Percent
White	835	4.6%
Black or African American	8,769	48.5%
American Indian and Alaska Native	180	1.0%
Asian	183	1.0%
Native Hawaiian and Other Pacific Islander	24	0.1%
Some other race	6,002	33.2%
Two or more races	2,073	11.5%
Hispanic or Latino (of any race)	8,406	46.5%

=== 2010 census ===
As of the census of 2010, there were 16,258 people residing in the CDP. The racial makeup of the CDP was 13.90% White, 63.11% African American, 0.79% Native American, 0.56% Asian, 0.07% Pacific Islander, 17.02% from other races, and 4.54% from two or more races. Hispanic or Latino of any race were 34.12% of the population.

=== 2000 census ===
As of the census of 2000, there were 15,854 people, 4,061 households, and 3,362 families residing in the CDP. The population density was 3,438.9 people/km^{2} (8,907 people/mi^{2}). There were 4,234 housing units at an average density of 918.4 units/km^{2} (2,379 units/mi^{2}). The racial makeup of the CDP was 3.97% White, 79.02% African American, 0.46% Native American, 0.49% Asian, 0.05% Pacific Islander, 8.33% from other races, and 3.69% from two or more races. Hispanic or Latino of any race were 16.22% of the population.

There were 4,061 households, out of which 38.3% had children under the age of 18 living with them, 44.2% were married couples living together, 30.3% had a female householder with no husband present, and 17.2% were non-families. 12.0% of all households were made up of individuals, and 4.1% had someone living alone who was 65 years of age or older. The average household size was 3.88 and the average family size was 3.98.

In the CDP, the population was spread out, with 30.5% under the age of 18, 9.7% from 18 to 24, 30.8% from 25 to 44, 20.9% from 45 to 64, and 8.1% who were 65 years of age or older. The median age was 32 years. For every 100 females, there were 88.8 males. For every 100 females age 18 and over, there were 84.4 males.

The median income for a household in the CDP was $56,715, and the median income for a family was $56,380. Males had a median income of $30,694 versus $29,566 for females. The per capita income for the CDP was $16,950. About 10.8% of families and 15.0% of the population were below the poverty line, including 20.1% of those under age 18 and 14.2% of those age 65 or over.

== Education ==
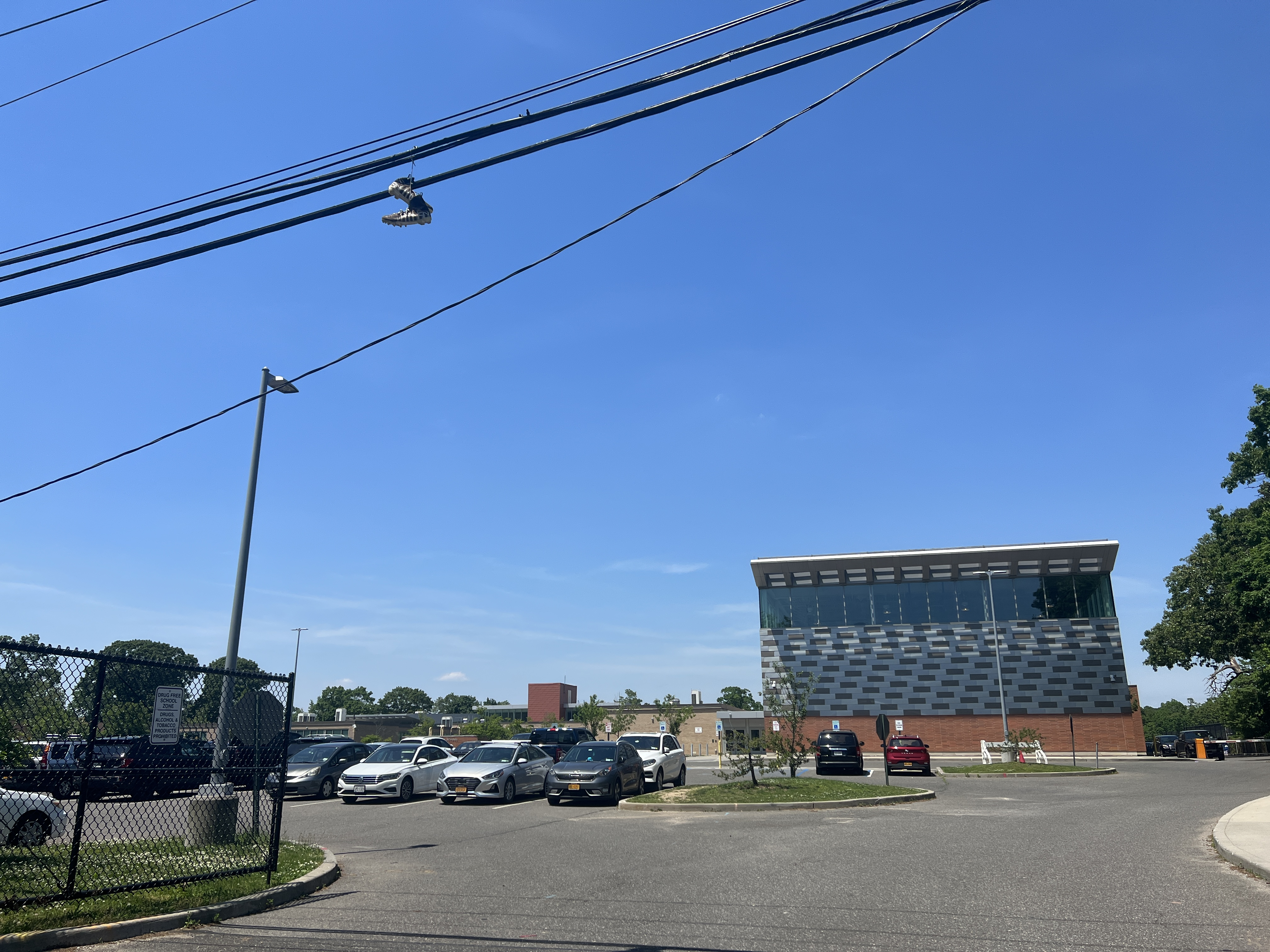
Roosevelt High School in May 2022

The majority of Roosevelt is located within the boundaries of (and is thus served by) the Roosevelt Union Free School District. However, small portions of the hamlet's southwestern and southeastern corners are located within the boundaries of (and thus served by) the Baldwin Union Free School District and the Freeport Union Free School District, respectively. Accordingly, children who reside within Roosevelt and attend public schools go to school in one of these three districts depending on where they live within the hamlet.

Additionally, the portion of the Meadowbrook State Parkway within the hamlet is located within the Merrick Union Free School District, the North Merrick Union Free School District, and the Bellmore–Merrick Central High School District. However, no residences in Roosevelt are located within these areas of the hamlet.

== Notable people ==
- David Ancrum (born 1958), basketball player, top scorer in the 1994 Israel Basketball Premier League
- Gabriel Casseus, actor and screenwriter
- Chuck D and Flavor Flav, hip hop artists
- Sandra Dee, actress
- Julius "Dr. J" Erving, former professional basketball player
- Roy Haynes, jazz drummer
- John Mackey, National Football League Hall of Fame member
- Miff Mole, trombonist
- Charlie Murphy, comedian/actor
- Eddie Murphy, comedian/actor
- Arvell Shaw, jazz bassist
- Howard Stern, radio personality
- Cynthia Smith, Program Director, WBLS-FM, New York
- Levar Stoney, Mayor of Richmond, Virginia
- Sabrina N. Thompson, aerospace engineer
- Steve White, actor
