= Tuckahoe Common School District =

School district in New York, United States

Address
- 468 Magee Street Southampton, New York, 11968; United States

District information
- Type: Public
- Grades: PreK–8
- NCES District ID: 3629070

Students and staff
- Students: 311
- Teachers: 34.0
- Staff: 37.3
- Student–teacher ratio: 9.15

Other information
- Website: www.tuckahoecommonsd.com

Tuckahoe Common School District (TCSD) is a school district headquartered in Southampton, New York. It operates a single school: Tuckahoe School, which serves grades PreK-6. As of 2020 the superintendent is Leonard Skuggevik.
