= New Suffolk School =

- U.S. National Register of Historic Places
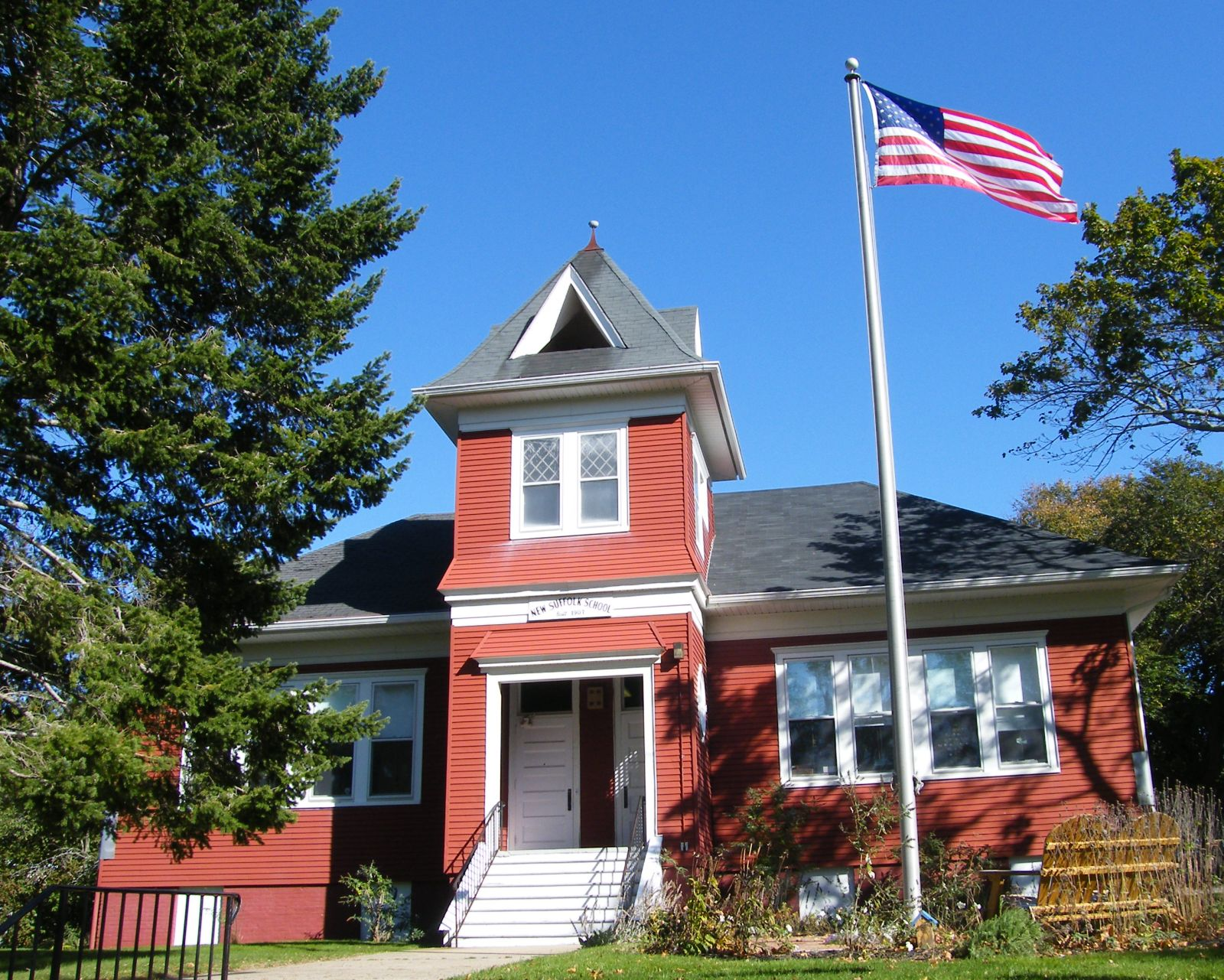
- New Suffolk School, October 2008

- Location within New York Location within the United States
- Location: Fifth Street at King St., New Suffolk, New York
- Coordinates: 40°59′33″N 72°28′31″W
- Area: less than one acre
- Built: 1907
- Architect: Tuthill, Edgar
- Architectural style: Colonial Revival, Queen Anne
- NRHP reference No.: 02001050
- Added to NRHP: September 12, 2002

New Suffolk School is a historic school building located at New Suffolk in Suffolk County, New York. It was built in 1907 and is a one-story, hip-roofed structure on a raised brick basement, with an engaged two-story central tower. Originally a two-room schoolhouse, it was expanded to three rooms in 1923. It features compound massing, complex roof form and eyebrow windows of the Queen Anne and Shingle styles and the Tuscan porch columns and oval windows common to the Colonial Revival style.

It was added to the National Register of Historic Places in 2002.
