= Roosevelt Union Free School District =

School district in New York, United States

District information
- Type: Public
- Motto: "Empowered! Efficient! Globally Ready!"
- Schools: 5

Students and staff
- Colors: Royal Blue and Gold

Other information
- Website: www.rooseveltufsd.org

The Roosevelt Union Free School District (RUFSD) is a public school district serving much of the Greater Roosevelt area in the Town of Hempstead, in Nassau County, on the South Shore of Long Island, in New York, United States.

The district primarily serves the unincorporated hamlet and CDP of Roosevelt, in addition to small portions of the unincorporated hamlet and CDP of Baldwin and the Incorporated Village of Freeport.

As of 2007 it was the first and only school district in New York to ever have been taken over by the state. However, in 2013, the state gave control back to the district.

== History ==
In the mid-20th Century, the Roosevelt Union Free School District, like the hamlet of the same name which it primarily serves, fell victim to real estate blockbusting, leading to the then-predominantly-white neighborhood and district rapidly gaining a large African American community, leading to major racial imbalances and causing a need for additional state funding. Furthermore, the district saw a massive increase in students and poverty at this time, and there was a need to increase the capacities of the schools by building extensions or replacing them from scratch, which only further caused the need for increased state aid.

In 2000, New York State Education Commissioner Richard P. Mills, citing the low academic performance in the district, threatened to shut down the Roosevelt Junior High School and Roosevelt High School.

In 2002, the State of New York controversially took over control of the school district due to the failing academic performance in the district. Control of the district by the State of New York lasted until 2013, when control was ultimately reverted back to the district.

Additionally occurring in the 21st century, Roosevelt Middle School was opened, Roosevelt High School was completely rebuilt, and three new, replacement elementary schools opened to replace the older elementary school buildings.

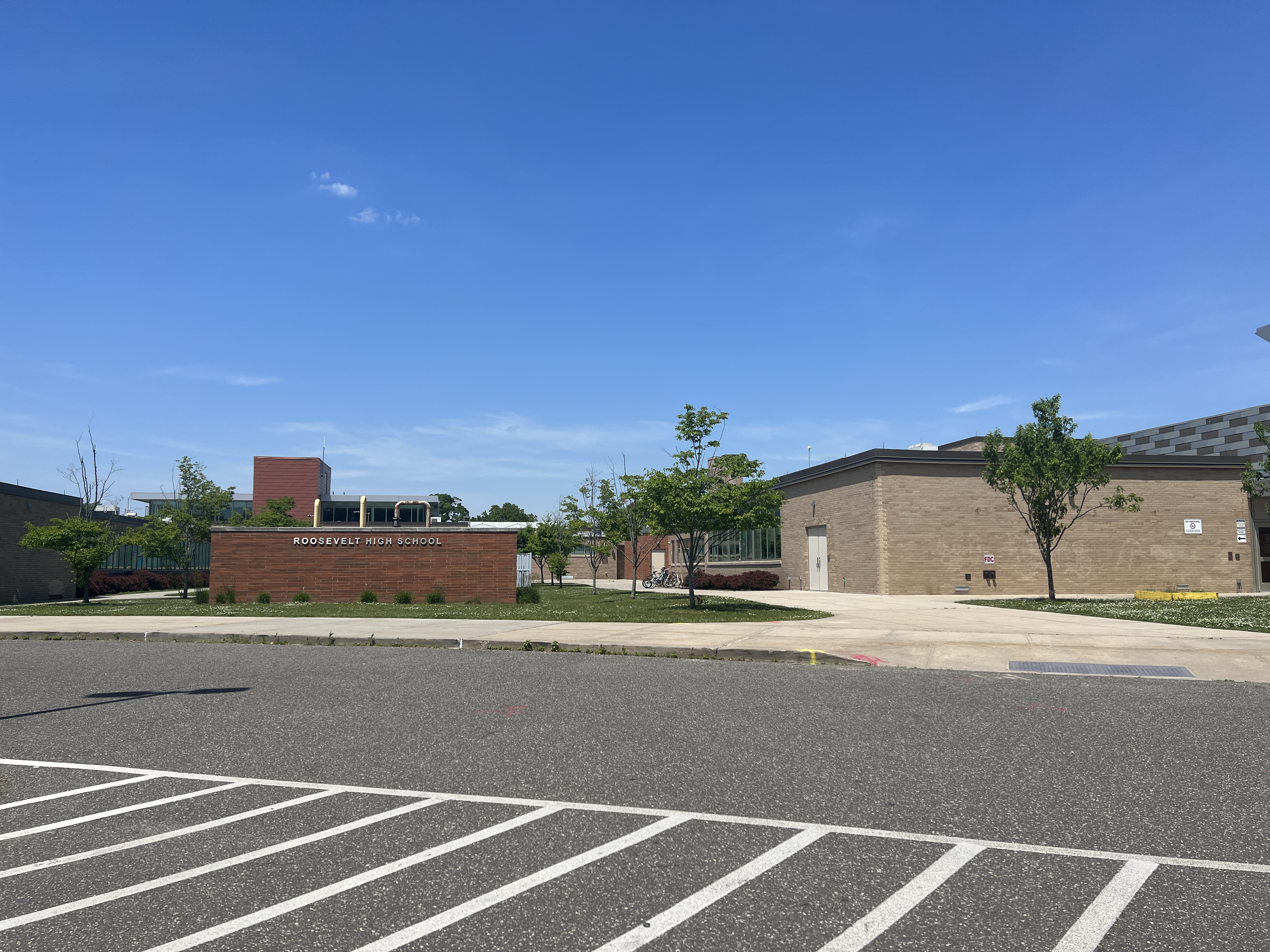
Roosevelt High School on May 31, 2022.

== Demographics ==
As of the 2020–21 school year, there were 3,180 students enrolled in the district. Of those 3,180 students, 1,691 (53%) were males while 1,489 (47%) were females.

The racial makeup of the students in the district during the 2020–21 school year was 42% Black or African American (1,345 students), 0% White (2 students), 0% Asian/Native Hawaiian/Other Pacific Islander (11 students), 0% Indian/Alaska Native (0 students), and 0% Multiracial (8 students). 57% of enrolled students were of Hispanic or Latino heritage of any race (1,814 students).

Furthermore, as of the 2020–21 school year, 30% of students (956) were English Language Learners (ELL), and 14% of students (437) had a disability. 73% of students (2,316) were economically disadvantaged, 3% (103 students) were homeless, 1% (17 students) were in foster care, and 1% (28 students) had at least one parent in the Armed Forces.

The 4-year graduation rate as of the 2020–21 school year was 87%, slightly above the New York State average of 86%.

== Schools ==
As of June 2022, the Roosevelt Union Free School District consists of the following schools:

=== Secondary schools ===
- Roosevelt High School
- Roosevelt Middle School

=== Primary schools ===
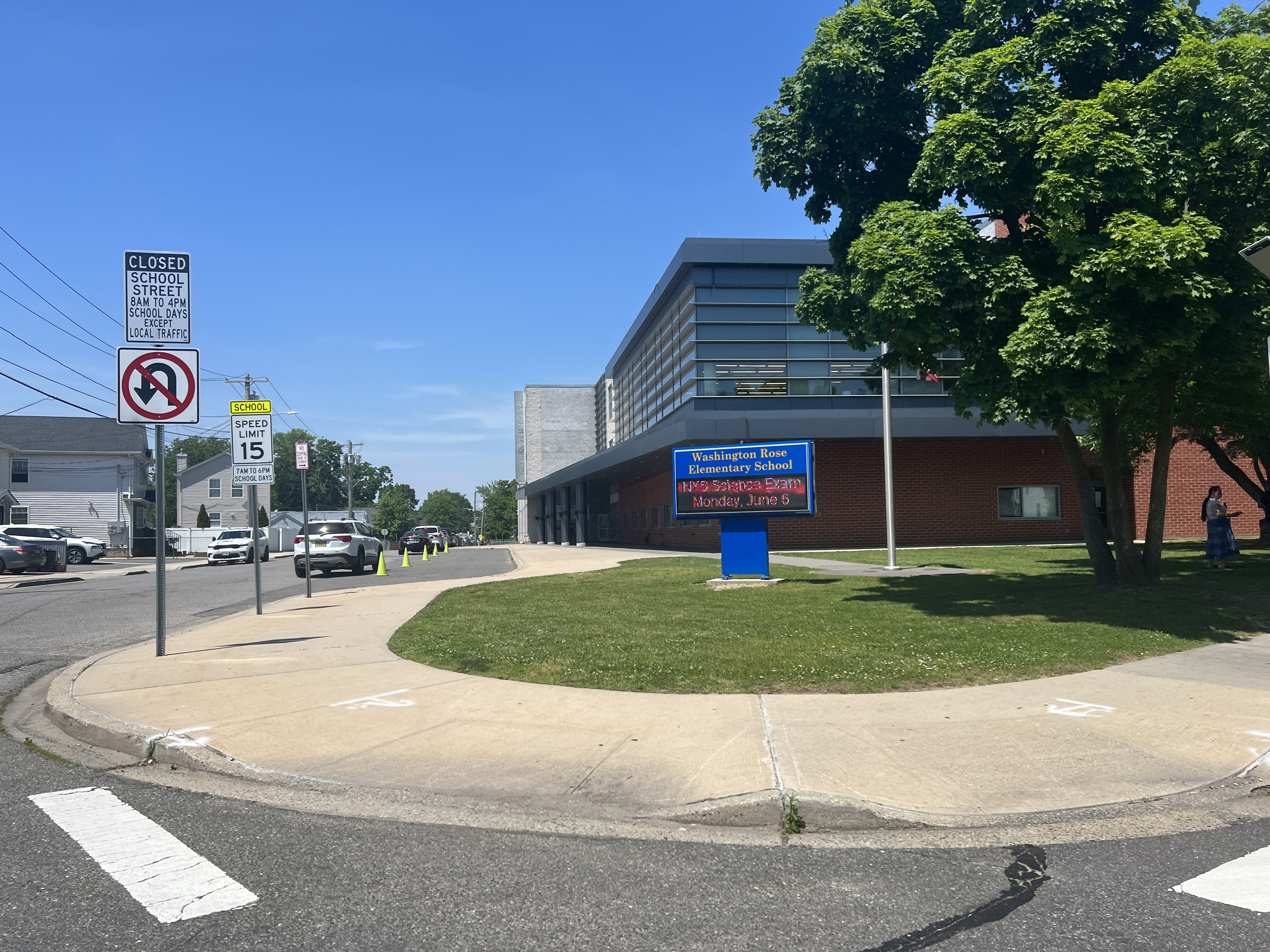
Washington Rose Elementary School on May 31, 2022.

- Ulysses Byas Elementary School
- Centennial Avenue Elementary School
- Washington Rose Elementary School

=== Alternative schools ===
- New Horizons Alternative Education Program

== Notable alumni ==
- Julius Erving – Member of the Basketball Hall of Fame; played for the Philadelphia 76ers until his retirement.
- Eddie Murphy – Actor and comedian.
- Howard Stern – Radio and television personality.
