= Roosevelt High School (Roosevelt, New York) =

School in New York, United States

Roosevelt High School is a four-year public high school located in Roosevelt as part of the Roosevelt School District, serving students in grades 9 through 12. It is located in the hamlet of Roosevelt in the Town of Hempstead, in Nassau County, on Long Island, in New York, United States.

As of the 2014–15 school year, the school had an enrollment of 964 students and 56.6 classroom teachers (on an FTE basis), for a student–teacher ratio of 17.0:1. There were 247 students (25.6% of enrollment) eligible for free lunch and 46 (4.8% of students) eligible for reduced-cost lunch.

== Academics ==
Roosevelt High School has a grading and promotion policy. In order for a student to be admitted to the ninth grade, a student must pass three of the four major subject areas each year:

- English
- Mathematics
- Science
- Social Studies

The student can fail no more than the equivalent of one credit in minor subjects each year (i.e., technology 0.5 credit, home economics 0.5 credit, etc.)

To be promoted from grade 9 to 10, a student must earn four units of credit, including one in English and one in social studies. To be promoted from grade 10 to grade 11, a student must have earned nine units of credit, including two in English, two in social studies, one in mathematics, and one in science. A student must receive a minimum grade of 70 in order to advance.

== Demographics ==
As of the 2018–19 school year, the student body of Roosevelt High School consisted of:

- 0 Indigenous or Alaska Native students (0% of the student body)
- 396 Black or African American students (40% of the student body)
- 592 Hispanic or Latino students (60% of the student body)
- 2 Asian or Native Hawaiian/Other Pacific Islander students (.05% of the student body)
- 1 White students (.01% of the student body)
- 0 Multiracial students (0% of the student body)

== Notable alumni ==
Notable Roosevelt Junior-Senior High School alumni include:

- Gabriel Casseus, actor (New Jersey Drive, Fallen, Their Eyes Were Watching God), writer and producer (Takers).
- Julius Erving, otherwise known as "Dr. J", member of the Basketball Hall of Fame who played for the Philadelphia 76ers until his retirement
- Eddie Murphy, comedian and actor
- Howard Stern, radio personality, who called the school "[his] own personal Vietnam"
