= Bethpage High School =

High school in Nassau County, New York, United States

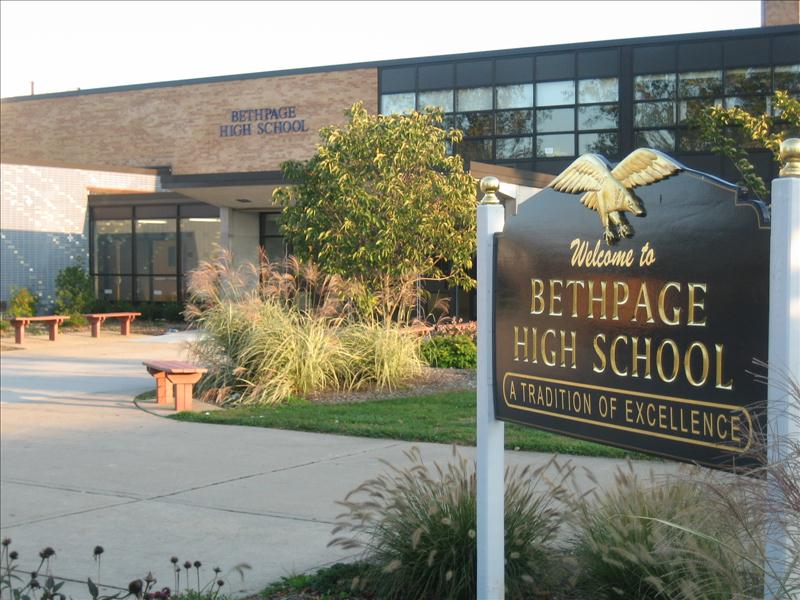
- Bethpage High School in Bethpage, New York

Location
- 10 Cherry Avenue; Bethpage, (Nassau County), New York 11714; United States; 40°45′18″N 73°28′59″W

Information
- Type: Public high school
- Established: 1960
- School district: Bethpage Union Free School District
- NCES School ID: 3604740
- Principal: Nicholas Jantz
- Faculty: 87.25 FTEs
- Grades: 9–12
- Enrollment: 1,013 (2025-2026)
- Student to teacher ratio: 11.40
- Colors: Navy and gold
- Mascot: Golden eagle
- Website: Bethpage High School

Bethpage High School is a high school in Bethpage, New York, United States. The school is situated at the corner of Stewart Avenue and Cherry Avenue, across from the Bethpage Community Park.

As of the 2023-24 school year, the school enrolled 1013 students. On average, each class size is between 25 and 30 students.

In 2019, the U.S. Department of Education named the school a National Blue Ribbon School in recognition of its students' overall high academic achievement. Bethpage ranked #928 on Newsweek's 2010 list of the top 1300 U.S. high schools, which was the final update before rankings were discontinued.

== Notable alumni ==
- Steve Grossman, former jazz fusion and hard bop saxophonist.
- Jordan Levine, men's lacrosse coach, Mercy College
- Chuck Lorre, television producer
- Thomas Michaelsen, professional lacrosse player and founder of 365lax Inc.
- Alex Reynolds, professional wrestler, All Elite Wrestling
- Dan Rich, entrepreneur
- Joe Sambito, former professional baseball player, Boston Red Sox, Houston Astros, and New York Mets
