= List of Omega Gamma Delta chapters =

Omega Gamma Delta is an American national high school fraternity founded in Brooklyn, New York in 1902. In the following list of chapters, active chapters are indicated in bold and inactive chapters are in italics.

Chaper	Charter date and range	Institution	Location	Status	Ref.
Alpha	June 22, 1902 – 1926; April 9, 1932 – 1938; June 22, 2002 – 2004	Boys’ High School and St. John's Preparatory School in Brooklyn; and Flushing High School in Flushing	Brooklyn, New York	Inactive	
**Beta**	October 27, 1902	Boys’ (Central) High School and Eastside High School in Paterson; Montclair High School, Montclair Academy, and Montclair Teachers’ College High School in Montclair; Ridgewood High School in Ridgewood; Butler High School in Butler; Hawthorne High School in Hawthorne; Fair Lawn High School in Fair Lawn, New Jersey; Glen Rock High School in Glen Rock, New Jersey; and Saddle Brook High School in Saddle Brook, New Jersey	Butler, Hawthorne, Montclair, Passaic, Paterson, and Ridgewood, New Jersey	Active	
Gamma	October 13, 1903 – 1938	Erasmus Hall High School	Brooklyn, New York	Inactive	
Delta	October 14, 1904 – 1965	Christopher Columbus High School, DeWitt Clinton High School, Evander Childs High School, George Washington High School, James Monroe High School, Morris High School, and Theodore Roosevelt High School in The Bronx; Berkeley Irving School and McBurney School in New York City; and Lincoln High School and Saunders High School in Yonkers	New York City, New York	Inactive	
Epsilon	March 15, 1905 – 1924	High School of Commerce and the Hamilton Institute in New York City; and DeWitt Clinton High School in The Bronx	New York City, New York	Inactive	
Zeta	1906–1914	Cambridge Rindge and Latin School	Cambridge, Massachusetts	Inactive	
Eta	1906–1912	McKinley Manual Training High School	Washington, D.C.	Inactive	
Theta	December 14, 1907 – 1913	Towanda High School	Towanda, Pennsylvania	Inactive	
Iota	February 20, 1910 – 1944	Montclair High School	Montclair, New Jersey	Inactive	
Kappa	December 20, 1910 – 1932	Barringer High School, East Side High School, Newark Academy, South Side High School, West Side High School in Newark; Columbia High School and South Orange High School in South Orange	Newark and South Orange, New Jersey	Inactive	(Note: Chapter formed from The Ramblers (local), established in 1901.)
Lambda	October 1, 1910 – 1925	Arthur Hill High School	Saginaw, Michigan	Inactive	(Note: Chapter formed from Beta Alpha Gamma.(local))
Mu	October 19, 1912 – 1962	Alexander Hamilton High School, Borough Hall Academy, Brooklyn Technical High School, Fort Hamilton High School, Manual Training High School (John Jay Educational Campus from 1959), McLoughlin High School, New Utrecht High School, St. Francis Prep School, St. Leonard's High School, and St. Michael's High School	Brooklyn, New York	Inactive	(Note: Chapter formed from Gamma Delta Phi (local), established circa 1903.)
Nu	February 7, 1913 – 1916; October 7, 1920 – 1942	Battin High School, Pingry Prep School, and Thomas Jefferson High School in Elizabeth; St. Benedict's Prep School in Newark; and Rahway High School in Rahway	Elizabeth, Newark, and Rahway, New Jersey	Inactive	
Xi	April 19, 1913 – 1934	Marquand School, New York Prep School, and Polytechnic Prep School in Brooklyn; South Side High School in Rockville Centre	Brooklyn, New York	Inactive	(Note: Formed from the Alpha chapter of Beta Delta Fraternity, established in 1910.)
Omicron	May 2, 1914 – 1945	Clifford J. Scott High School and East Orange High School in East Orange; Barringer High School in Newark, New Jersey; and South Orange High School in South Orange, New Jersey	East Orange, New Jersey	Inactive	
Pi	June 6, 1914 – 1939	Stuyvesant High School and DeWitt Clinton High School	New York City, New York	Inactive	
Rho	November 21, 1914 – 1955	A. B. Davis High School and Mount Vernon High School in Mount Vernon; Pelham High School in Pelham, New York; New Rochelle High School in New Rochelle, New York; and Bronxville High School in Bronxville, New York	Mount Vernon, New York	Inactive	
Sigma	February 2, 1915 – 1916	Blair Academy	Blairstown, New Jersey	Inactive	
Theta II (Deuteron)	February 9, 1917 – 1917	Swarthmore Prep School	Swarthmore, Pennsylvania	Inactive	
Tau (see also Chi)	December 20, 1919 – 1950	Orange High School in Orange and West Orange High School in West Orange	Orange and West Orange, New Jersey	Inactive	
Upsilon	June 4, 1920 – 1935	Brooklyn Prep School	Brooklyn, New York	Inactive	
Phi	February 6, 1921 – June 1921	Bloomfield High School	Bloomfield, New Jersey	Inactive	
Chi (see also Tau)	May 13, 1921 – 1936	West Orange High School	West Orange, New Jersey	Inactive	
Phi II (Deuteron)	September 17, 1921 – 1930; April 6, 1935 – 1937	Holy Trinity High School and Westfield High School in Westfield; Cranford High School in Cranford; Roselle Park High School in Roselle Park; and Plainfield High School in Plainfield	Cranford, Plainfield, Roselle Park, and Westfield, New Jersey	Inactive	
Psi	October 17, 1921 – 1937; November 14, 1940 – 1952	Bulkeley High School, Hartford High School, and Weaver High School in Hartford; West Hartford High School and William Hall High School in West Hartford; and East Hartford High School in East Hartford	Hartford and West Hartford, Connecticut	Inactive	(Note: Chapter formed from Delta Gamma Fraternity (local).)
Zeta Deuteron	April 21, 1922 – 1927	Fordham Prep School and George Washington High School	The Bronx, New York City, New York	Inactive	
Omega				Unassigned	
Alpha Alpha	May 19, 1922 – 1943	Bloomfield High School in Bloomfield and Glen Ridge High School in Glen Ridge, New Jersey	Bloomfield, New Jersey	Inactive	
Alpha Beta	February 4, 1923 – 1936	Lafayette High School, Lewis J. Bennett High School, Masten Park High School, and South Park High School	Buffalo, New York	Inactive	(Note: Chapter was formed from a local fraternity that operated before 1923.)
Alpha Gamma	January 5, 1923 – 1943; December 6, 1946 – 1952	John Adams High School and Richmond Hill High School in Richmond Hill; Newtown High School in Newtown, New York; Franklin K. Lane High School in Cypress Hills, New York; and Jamaica High School in Jamaica, New York	Richmond Hill, New York	Inactive	
Alpha Delta	March 10, 1923 – 1934	Hope High School and Moses Brown Prep School	Providence, Rhode Island	Inactive	
Alpha Epsilon	March 23, 1923 – 1928	Stevens Prep School	Hoboken, New Jersey	Inactive	(Note: Chapter formed from the Gamma chapter of Theta Mu Sigma, established in. 1921.)
Alpha Zeta	May 2, 1923 – 1943; March 2, 1963 – 1964	Saint John's Prep School	Brooklyn, New York	Inactive	
Sigma Deuteron	February 18, 1925 – 1931	Cranford High School	Cranford, New Jersey	Inactive	
Alpha Eta	May 2, 1925 – 1925	Scott High School	Toledo, Ohio	Inactive	
Theta III (Triton)	November 12, 1925 – 1976	Lynbrook High School in Lynbrook; East Rockaway High School in East Rockaway, New York; and Freeport High School in Freeport, New York	Lynbrook, New York	Inactive	
Alpha Eta II (Deuteron)	December 12, 1925 – 1940	Eastside High School, Shaw High School, and University Prep School	Cleveland, Ohio	Inactive	
Alpha Theta	January 7, 1928 – 1937	Patchogue High School and Sayville High School	Patchogue and Sayville, New York	Inactive	
Alpha Iota	February 2, 1929 – 1944	Bay Shore High School	Bayshore, New York	Inactive	
Alpha Kappa	June 1, 1929 – 1938	Linden High School, Metuchen High School, and Rahway High School	Linden, Metuchen, and Rahway, New Jersey	Inactive	
Alpha Lambda	November 1, 1930 – 1938	Rye Neck High School in Mamaroneck and Rye High School in Rye, New York	Mamaroneck, New York	Inactive	
Alpha Mu	December 6, 1930 – 1940; April 11, 1942 – 1957	Jamaica High School	Jamaica, New York	Inactive	
Alpha Nu	January 3, 1931 – 1936	Samuel Tilden High School	Brooklyn, New York	Inactive	
Alpha Xi	January 3, 1931 – 1948	Horace Mann Prep School and The McBurney School	New York City, New York	Inactive	
Alpha Omicron	June 6, 1931 – 1935	Manhasset High School	Manhasset, New York	Inactive	
**Alpha Pi**	June 6, 1931	Peekskill High School	Peekskill, New York	Active	
Alpha Rho	October 3, 1931 – 1932	Troy High School	Troy, New York	Inactive	
Alpha Pi Deuteron	January 7, 1933 – 1946; September 11, 1948 – 1949	St. Francis Prep School and St. Michael's High School	Brooklyn, New York	Inactive	
Alpha Rho Deuteron	January 7, 1933 – 1936; March 2, 1940 – 1942	James Madison High School and St. Augustine's High School	Brooklyn, New York	Inactive	
Alpha Sigma	April 1, 1933 – 1952	Sewanhaka High School	Floral Park and Valley Stream, New York	Inactive	
Alpha Tau	April 6, 1935 – 1936	St. Leonard's School	Brooklyn, New York	Inactive	
Alpha Upsilon	November 6, 1935 – 1941	New Rochelle High School	New Rochelle, New York	Inactive	
**Alpha Phi**	January 9, 1937	East Rockaway High School	East Rockaway, New York	Active	
Alpha Chi	January 9, 1937 – 1939; March 14, 1942 – 1972	Hempstead High School	Hempstead, New York	Inactive	
**Alpha Psi**	April 26, 1937	Central High School	Valley Stream, New York	Active	(Note: Chapter formed from Sigma Lambda Alpha Scouting Fraternity, established circa 1930.)
Alpha Omega				Unassigned	
Beta Alpha	December 4, 1937 – January 1938	Ridgewood High School	Ridgewood, New Jersey	Inactive	
Beta Alpha Deuteron	June 4, 1938 – 1954	Andrew Jackson High School	Hollis and St. Albans, New York	Inactive	
Beta Beta	March 2, 1940 – 1943	Brooklyn Technical High School	Brooklyn, New York	Inactive	
Beta Gamma	March 2, 1940 – 1985	Oceanside Senior High School	Oceanside, New York	Inactive	
Beta Delta	October 5, 1940 – 1941	Scarsdale High School	Scarsdale, New York	Inactive	
Beta Epsilon	October 26, 1940 – 1948	Scotch Plains High School	Fanwood and Scotch Plains, New Jersey	Inactive	
Beta Zeta	February 1, 1941 – 1943	New Utrecht High School	Brooklyn, New York	Inactive	
**Beta Eta**	February 7, 1942	Mahopac High School	Mahopac, New York	Active	
Beta Eta Deuteron	April 11, 1942 – 1959	Fort Hamilton High School	Brooklyn, New York	Inactive	
Beta Theta	October 6, 1945 – 1953	Woodrow Wilson High School	Queens, New York	Inactive	
Beta Iota	October 5, 1946 – 1948; October 19, 1949 – 1951	Chaminade High School	Mineola, New York	Inactive	
Beta Kappa	November 3, 1946 – 1949	Mineola High School	Mineola, New York	Inactive	
Beta Lambda	December 7, 1946 – 1956	Pelham Memorial High School	Pelham, New York	Inactive	
Beta Mu	March 23, 1947 – 1950	Newburgh Free Academy	Newburgh, New York	Inactive	
Beta Nu	September 11, 1948 – 1951	John Adams High School	Ozone Park, New York	Inactive	
Beta Xi	September 11, 1948 – 1957	St. Michael’s Diocesan High School	Brooklyn, New York	Inactive	
Beta Phi	October 10, 1949 – 1952	Tuckahoe High School	Tuckahoe, New York	Inactive	
Beta Omicron	February 6, 1950 – 1953	Power Memorial Academy	Bronx, New York	Inactive	
Beta Chi	May 12, 1956 – December 30, 1997	West Hempstead High School in West Hempstead and H. Frank Carey High School in Franklin Square, New York	West Hempstead, New York	Inactive	
Beta Psi	January 23, 1957 – 1988	Valley Stream North High School	North Valley Stream, New York	Inactive	
Beta Omega				Unassigned	
Phi Rho Omega	May 11, 1957 – November 2, 1963	Eastside High School	Paterson, New Jersey	Merged	(Note: Members transferred to the Phi Rho Delta chapter.)
Gamma Beta	February 1, 1958 – 1972	Fair Lawn High School	Fair Lawn, New Jersey	Inactive	
Gamma Chi	February 1, 1958 – 1960	San Juan High School	San Juan, Puerto Rico	Inactive	
Zeta Gamma	April 7, 1959 – 1972	Half Hollow Hills High School	Huntington, New York	Inactive	
Beta Chi Beta	April 7, 1959 – 1965	Malverne High School	Malverne, New York	Inactive	
Zeta Psi	April 7, 1959 – 1964; November 6, 1965 – 1972	Massapequa High School	Massapequa, New York	Inactive	
Gamma Psi	June 12, 1959 – 1972	East Meadow High School in East Meadow and W. Tresper Clarke High School in Westbury, New York	East Meadow, New York	Inactive	
Delta Psi	November 14, 1959 – 1990	Valley Stream South High School	South Valley Stream, New York	Inactive	
Delta Phi	December 1959 – 1978	St. Mary's High School	Totowa, New Jersey	Inactive	(Note: Chapter formed from Delta Phi Fraternity (local), established circa May 1957.)
Gamma Theta	February 2, 1960 – 1975	Sachem High School	Lake Ronkonkoma, New York	Inactive	
Iota Rho	March 5, 1960 – 1982	Baldwin Senior High School	Baldwin, New York	Inactive	
Alpha Psi Alpha	April 4, 1960 – 1961	Bethpage High School	Bethpage, New York	Inactive	
Delta Psi Delta	January 7, 1961 – 1971	Babylon High School	North Babylon and West Babylon, New York	Inactive	
Chi Beta Chi	November 12, 1960 – 1968; June 9, 1990 – April 26, 1998	H. Frank Carey High School	Franklin Square, New York	Inactive	
Alpha Sigma Psi	November 12, 1960 – 1974	Manchester Regional High School	Haledon, North Haledon, and Prospect Park, New Jersey	Inactive	
Iota Omega	December 3, 1960 – 1978	All parochial high schools	Paterson, New Jersey	Inactive	
Delta Psi Epsilon	January 7, 1961 – 1971	Babylon High School	Babylon, New York	Inactive	
Phi Rho Gamma	February 10, 1962 – 1972	Clifton High School	Clifton, New Jersey	Inactive	
Delta Chi	March 10, 1962 – 1975	South Side High School	Rockville Centre, New York	Inactive	
Delta Psi Alpha	March 23, 1963 – 1972	Lindenhurst High School	Lindenhurst, New York	Inactive	
Upsilon Zeta	June 7, 1963 – 1972	Paul D. Schreiber High School	Port Washington, New York	Inactive	
Phi Rho Delta	November 2, 1963 – 1972	Eastside High School	Paterson, New Jersey	Inactive	(Note: Chapter formed from the merger of Phi Rho Delta (local), established in 1959, and the Phi Rho Omega chapter.)
Tau Zeta	February 25, 1965 – April 26, 1998	Freeport High School	Freeport, New York	Inactive	(Note: Chapter formed from Tau Zeta Gamma (local), established in 1963.)
Phi Beta	March 6, 1965 – 1971	Pope Pius XII High School	Passaic, New Jersey	Inactive	
Kappa Psi	May 1, 1966 – 1980	Earl L. Vandermeulen High School in Port Jefferson and Shoreham-Wading River High School in Shoreham, New York	Port Jefferson, New York	Inactive	
**Beta Pi**	March 2, 1967	Pompton Lakes High School in Pompton Lakes and Indian Hills High School and Ramapo High School in Oakland, New Jersey	Pompton Lakes, New Jersey	Active	
Sigma Delta	December 29, 1968 – February 15, 1970	Carteret High School	Carteret, New Jersey	Inactive	
Beta Rho	October 8, 1968 – 1979	Comsewogue High School	Port Jefferson Station, New York	Inactive	
**Beta Sigma**	January 10, 1976	West Hempstead High School	Island Park, New York	Active	
Beta Tau	April 24, 1977 – 1979	Shoreham-Wading River High School	Shoreham, New York	Inactive	
Beta Upsilon	May 14, 1988 – 1995	Sanford H. Calhoun High School and Wellington C. Mepham High School	Merrick, New York	Inactive	
Gamma Alpha	July 20, 1991 – 2005	Saddle Brook High School	Saddle Brook, New Jersey	Inactive	
Gamma Gamma	October 21, 2001 – 2005	Butler High School	Butler, New Jersey	Inactive	
**Chi Alpha**	August 20, 2011	College of Central Florida	Ocala, Florida	Active	
Chi Beta	February 4, 2012 –2013	Georgia State University	Atlanta, Georgia	Inactive	
**Delta Alpha**	June 21, 2014		Daytona Beach, Florida	Active	
**Delta Beta**	June 21, 2014		Dallas, Texas	Active	
**Delta Gamma**	February 17, 2015		Nassau County, New York	Active	
**Delta Delta**	February 17, 2015		Tampa Bay, Florida	Active	
**Delta Epsilon**	February 17, 2015		Northern New Jersey	Active	
**Delta Zeta**	April 17, 2016		Nassau County, New York	Active	
**Delta Theta**	November 27, 2016		Palm Beach County, Florida	Active	
**Delta Iota**	2019		Grapevine, Texas	Active	
**Delta Kappa**	2019		Charlotte, North Carolina	Active	
**Delta Lambda**	2021		Myrtle Beach, South Carolina	Active	
