= Valley Stream School District =

Valley Stream School District may refer to one of several related school districts in Nassau County, New York, USA.

== Elementary school districts ==
- Valley Stream 13 Union Free School District
- Valley Stream 24 Union Free School District
- Valley Stream 30 Union Free School District

== Secondary school district ==
- Valley Stream Central High School District
