= Frederic P. Wiedersum Associates =

Practice information
- Founders: Fred Wiedersum
- Founded: 1926
- Dissolved: 2019 (acquired by H2M architects + engineers)
- Location: Valley Stream, New York

Significant works and honors
- Buildings: Hall of Education (1964 New York World's Fair); Nassau Community College; Queensborough Community College

Website
- Official website (archived)

Frederic P. Wiedersum Associates (also known as Wiedersum Associates and Wiedersum Associates Architects, PLLC) was a major architectural and engineering firm headquartered in Valley Stream, in Nassau County, on Long Island, in New York, United States. The firm was best known for designing schools and other institutions and facilities throughout the New York metropolitan area. It was acquired by H2M architects + engineers in 2019.

== Description ==
The firm was founded in 1926 by Frederic "Fred" P. Wiedersum, and was headquartered in Valley Stream, New York. Throughout the firm's existence, it designed over 2,000 projects, including hundreds of schools and other major institutions and facilities throughout the New York metropolitan area – most notably on Long Island. The firm also formerly operated an office in Trenton, New Jersey and Hauppauge, New York.

In 1949, the Economic Cooperation Administration selected Frederic Wiedersum, who through his firm designed many schools, to aid the British in school designs as part of the Technical Assistance Program, under the Marshall Plan.

Frederic P. Wiedersum Associates was also the firm which designed the Hall of Education at the 1964 New York World's Fair, located at Flushing Meadows–Corona Park in Queens.

Wiedersum Associates was acquired by Melville, New York-based H2M architects + engineers in early 2019.

== Notable works ==
- Baldwin Senior High School (Baldwin, New York)
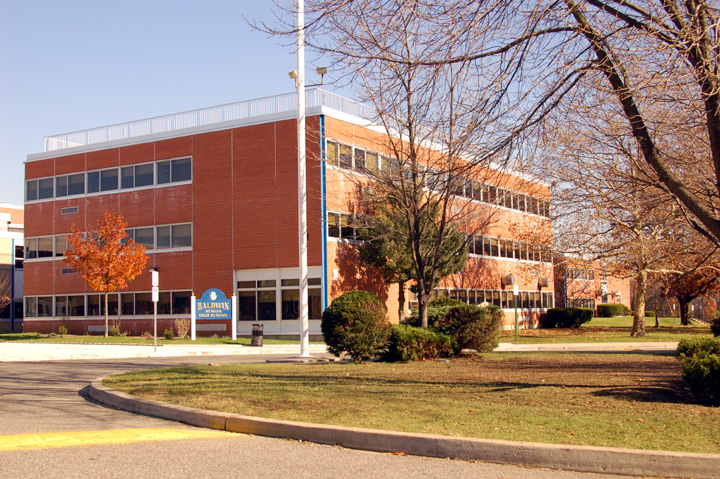
  Baldwin Senior High School
- Bay Shore High School (expansion) (Bay Shore, New York)
- Bethpage High School (Bethpage, New York)
- Cradle of Aviation Museum (East Garden City, New York (Uniondale))
- John F. Kennedy High School (Bellmore, New York)
- Burlington Township High School (Burlington, Township, New Jersey)
- Cantiague Park (Hicksville, New York)
- Commack High School (Commack, New York)
- East Meadow High School (East Meadow, New York)
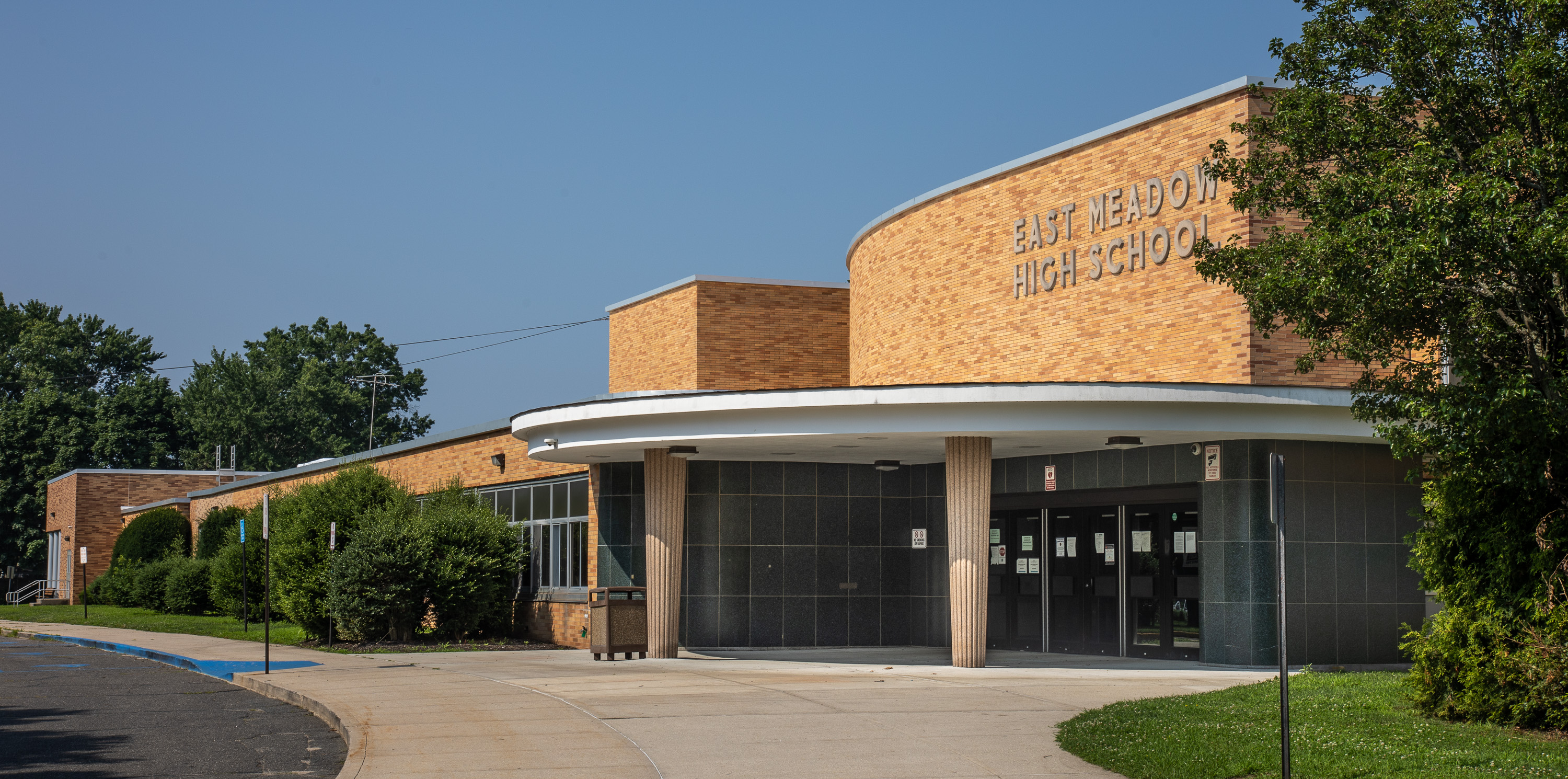
  East Meadow High School
- Elmont Memorial High School (Elmont, New York)
- George W. Hewlett High School (Hewlett Bay Park, New York)
- Hall of Education (Flushing, New York)
- Herricks High School (Searingtown, New York)
- Malverne High School (Malverne, New York)
- Nassau Community College (East Garden City, New York (Uniondale))
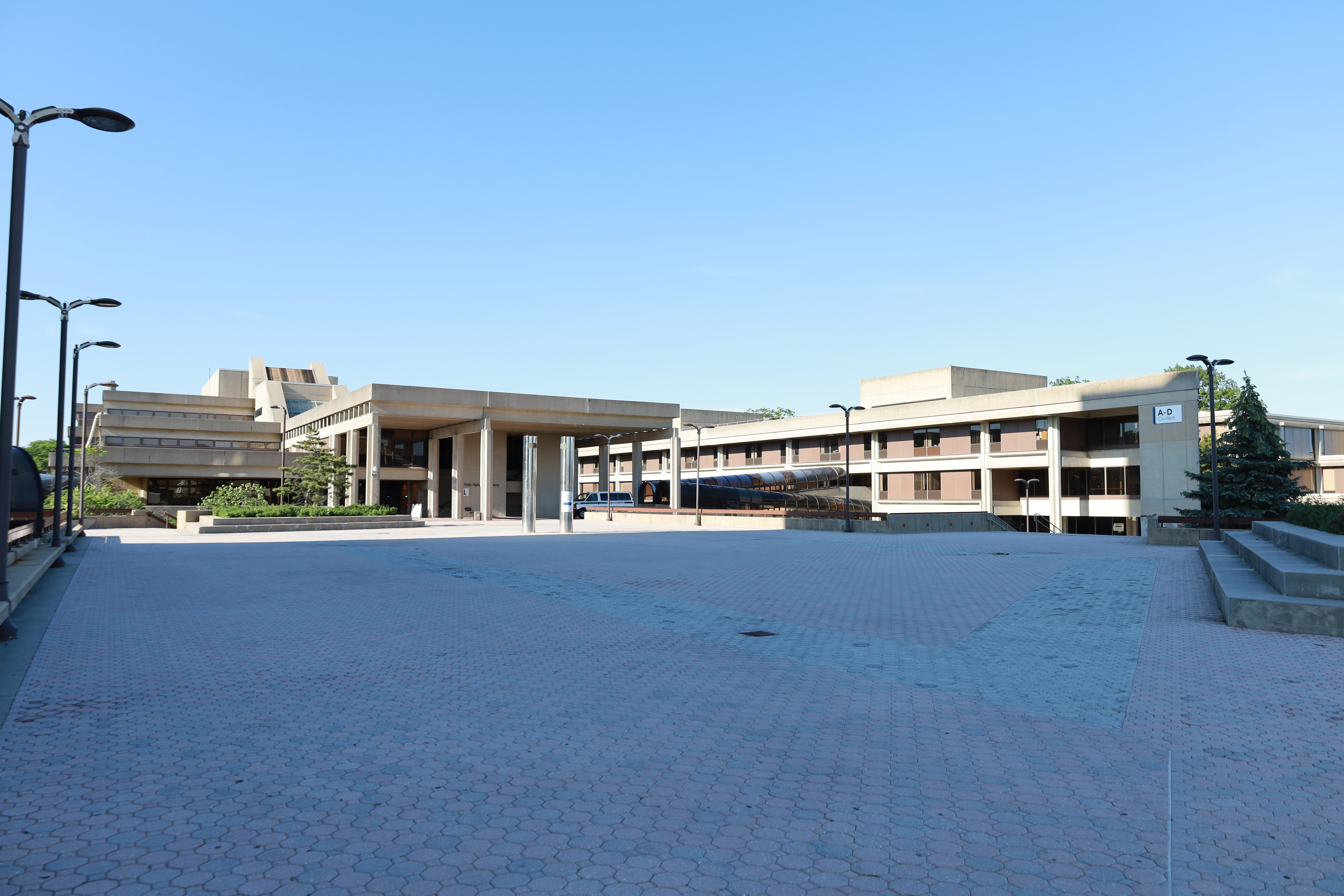
  Nassau Community College
- North Rockland High School (Thiells, New York)
- Queensborough Community College (Bayside, New York)
- Seaford High School (Seaford, New York)
- Shawnee High School (Medford Township, New Jersey)
- St. Francis Hospital (various buildings) (Flower Hill, New York)
- Trinity Episcopal Church (restorations) (Roslyn, New York)
- Valley Stream Central High School (Valley Stream, New York)
- Valley Stream North High School (Franklin Square, New York)
- Valley Stream South High School (South Valley Stream, New York)
- W. Tresper Clarke High School (Salisbury, New York)
- Wantagh Senior High School (Wantagh, New York)
- Wellington C. Mepham High School (North Bellmore, New York)

== See also ==
- Eggers & Higgins
- Kahn & Jacobs
- Educational architecture
