= Babby =

Babby may refer to:

- A baby, in some dialects of English
- Ken Babby, an American businessperson
- Lon Babby (born 1951), an American lawyer
