= Valley Stream Central High School =

School in Valley Stream, New York, U.S.

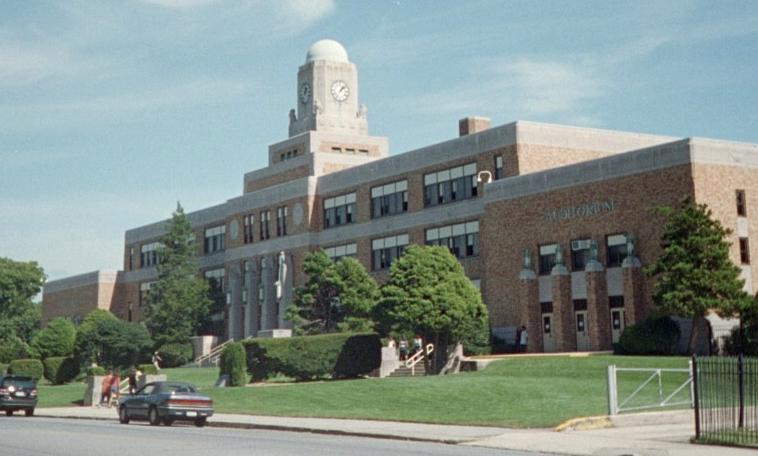

Location
- 135 Fletcher Avenue, Valley Stream, New York 11580-4099; United States; 40°40′28″N 73°42′03″W

Information
- School type: Public
- Opened: 1928
- School district: Valley Stream Central High School District
- Superintendent: Wayne R. Loper
- NCES School ID: 362952003980
- Principal: Candace Hugee
- Faculty: 79.88 FTEs
- Grades: 10–12
- Gender: Coeducational
- Average class size: 27
- Student to teacher ratio: 14.02
- Colors: Blue and white
- Mascot: Eagle
- Team name: Eagles
- USNWR ranking: 103 in New York State
- Newspaper: The Crier
- Magnet School: Yes
- Year-round schedule: Yes
- Website: Valley Stream Central High School

Valley Stream Central High School is a public senior high school (grades 10–12) in the Incorporated Village of Valley Stream in Nassau County, on the South Shore of Long Island, in New York, United States. It is part of the Valley Stream Central High School District. Candace Hugee has been the Principal since 2023. According to U.S. News & World Report, Central is the top performing High School in the District with the ranking of #103 in New York State compared to North's #138 and South's #131. Central has a graduation rate of above 95% and was recently recognized by New York State for having one of the highest graduation rates among men of color.

As of the 2022–23 school year, the school had an enrollment of 1,078 students and 78.6 classroom teachers (on an FTE basis), for a student–teacher ratio of 13.7:1. There were 420 students (39.0% of enrollment) eligible for free lunch and 43 (4.0% of students) eligible for reduced-cost lunch.

== History ==
Valley Stream Central High School opened in 1928. The art deco school was designed by Frederic P. Wiedersum, the founder of the Valley Stream-based architectural firm, Frederic P. Wiedersum Associates.

== Performing arts program ==
School mascot

Valley Stream Central High School is the only school in the Valley Stream Central High School District to house a performing arts program. The program, which is led by the District's "Fine and Performing Arts Department" director Adam Erdos offers students across the District grades 9–12 to take courses such as Theatre Arts, Dance, Voice Theatre, Dance Theatre, Acting, Musical Theatre, and Video Technology. The program is offered to students at Valley Stream North High School, Valley Stream South High School and Valley Stream Memorial Junior High School as well as Central students. To enter the program, one must fill in an application, which is provided on the District's website. Students from the other three schools are at Central for a portion of their day and then are either bussed or walk to their home school for the rest of their academic classes. The Performing Arts Program often puts on Dance Concerts and Showcases at Central's Bert Keller Auditorium, these performances are at night and are open to the public.

== Career prep program ==
The Valley Stream Central High School District offers a wide variety of Career Prep Programs to its thousands of students, but similarly to Performing Arts, some of these programs are exclusively offered at Central. For example, Central is the only school in the district to house the Culinary Program and the Cosmetology Program. Other Career Prep Programs that students can take are Business and Technology classes and some Central students are a part of the Nassau County BOCES program, which provides vocational training at a different location.

== Notable alumni ==
- Richie Alan, drummer
- The Aquatones, 1950s doo wop group
- Fred Armisen, actor and comedian
- Bruce Blakeman, politician and lawyer
- Sonia Blangiardo, producer, director
- Stephen Boyd, NFL football player
- Michael Brandon, actor
- Jim Breuer (born 1967, class of 1985) stand-up comedian and actor who was a cast member on Saturday Night Live from 1995 to 1998
- Steve Buscemi, actor and film director
- Conrad Cardinal, Major League Baseball player
- Patricia Charbonneau, actress
- Connie Dierking, NBA basketball player, Univ. of Cincinnati
- Fern Fitzgerald dancer (Broadway) and actress (Dallas, Seinfeld)
- Michael J. Garcia, Associate Judge, New York State Court of Appeals
- Tom Gorman, MLB baseball player
- George Grasso, former NYPD First Deputy Police Commissioner and Judge
- Steve Hytner, actor
- Martin Kove, actor
- Phil LaPorta, football player for Penn State and NFL New Orleans Saints
- Les Moonves, television executive and former CEO of CBS
- Victor Ochi, NFL football player
- Steve Orich Broadway orchestrator and composer
- Vincent Penna, actor and voice talent
- Dick Poillon (1920–1994), American football halfback who played in the NFL for the Washington Redskins
- Edward J. Renehan Jr., Writer and publisher
- Martin Rosen, writer, producer, director
- Greg Smith, bassist and vocalist (Ted Nugent, Alice Cooper, Rainbow)
- Dom Starsia, lacrosse coach
- Miles Caton, actor and singer
