= Victor Ochi =

American football player (born 1993)

No. 40, 57, 54, 51, 99, 59
- Position: Linebacker

Personal information
- Born: October 2, 1993 (age 33); The Bronx, New York, U.S.
- Listed height: 6 ft 1 in (1.85 m)
- Listed weight: 242 lb (110 kg)

Career information
- High school: Valley Stream Central (Valley Stream, New York)
- College: Stony Brook
- NFL draft: 2016: undrafted

Career history
- Baltimore Ravens (2016)*; New York Jets (2016); Kansas City Chiefs (2016); Tennessee Titans (2017); New York Guardians (2020)*; Team 9 (2020)*; Los Angeles Wildcats (2020)
- * Offseason or practice squad member only

Career NFL statistics
- Total tackles: 1
- Stats at Pro Football Reference

Victor Ochi (born October 2, 1993) is an American former professional football player who was a linebacker in the National Football League (NFL). He played college football for the Stony Brook Seawolves. He was originally signed as an undrafted free agent by the Baltimore Ravens after the 2016 NFL draft.

== Early life ==
Ochi was born in The Bronx on October 2, 1993, to Emmanuel and Queen Ochi, immigrants from Nigeria. At an early age, he became a fan of the New York Giants, studying great pass rushers like Michael Strahan and Osi Umenyiora. His parents wanted him to focus on his studies, and did not let him play football until his sophomore year of high school, when he finally convinced them to allow him to try out for the school team.

He also lived with an aunt in Nigeria from the ages of 9 to 12.

Ochi attended Valley Stream Central High School, where he played football and ran track. As a junior, he recorded 57 tackles and 8.5 sacks. As a senior, he recorded 72 tackles and 11 sacks. He was an All-New York State, All-Nassau County and All-Long Island selection. He ranked fourth in MSG Varsity's top 100 players on Long Island. He also played for Long Island in the Outback Steakhouse Empire Challenge.

== College career ==
After high school, Ochi attended Stony Brook University. In 2011, he redshirted his true freshman season. As a redshirt freshman in 2012, he appeared in all 13 games, starting five. He recorded 45 tackles, 7.5 tackles-for-loss and three sacks. In 2013, as a redshirt sophomore he appeared in 11 games, with nine starts. He recorded 33 tackles, 10 tackles-for-loss, 5.5 sacks and one forced fumble. As a redshirt junior in 2014, he started all 11 games. He recorded 57 tackles, 16.5 tackles-for-loss, 11 sacks and two forced fumbles. In 2015, as a redshirt senior, he recorded 47 tackles, 16.5 tackles-for-loss and 13 sacks. He then played in the East-West Shrine Game. His totals made him Stony Brook's All-time sacks leader.

=== Career statistics ===
Season				Defense					Fumbles	
Year	Team	GP	GS	Tack.	Solo.	Ass.	Sacks	TFL	FF	FR
2011	SBU	--	--	--	--	--	--	--	--	--
2012	SBU	13	0	45	22	23	3	7.5	0	0
2013	SBU	11	9	33	20	13	5.5	10	1	0
2014	SBU	11	11	57	33	24	11	16.5	2	0
2015	SBU	10	10	47	29	18	13	16.5	1	0
Career		45	30	182	104	78	32.5	50.5	4	0

== Professional career ==
Pre-draft measurables
Height	Weight	Arm length	Hand span	40-yard dash	10-yard split	20-yard split	20-yard shuttle	Three-cone drill	Vertical jump	Broad jump	Bench press
6 ft 1 in (1.85 m)	246 lb (112 kg)	33 3/4 in (0.86 m)	10 1/8 in (0.26 m)	4.86 s	1.66 s	2.84 s	4.40 s	7.24 s	32 in (0.81 m)	9 ft 11 in (3.02 m)	22* reps
All values from NFL Scouting Combine. Bench press from Pro Day.

=== Baltimore Ravens ===
After going undrafted in the 2016 NFL draft, Ochi was signed by the Baltimore Ravens on May 6, 2016. He was released on September 3 during final cuts.

=== New York Jets ===
On September 5, 2016, Ochi was signed to the New York Jets' practice squad. On October 22, he was promoted to the Jets active roster. He was released by the Jets on November 5, 2016, and was re-signed to the practice squad on November 12.

=== Kansas City Chiefs ===
On January 4, 2017, Ochi was signed by Kansas City Chiefs off the Jets' practice squad. He was waived by the Chiefs on May 22, 2017.

=== Tennessee Titans ===
On June 13, 2017, Ochi signed with the Tennessee Titans. He was waived/injured by the Titans on August 6, 2017, after suffering a torn ACL and was placed on injured reserve.

On April 9, 2018, Ochi was waived by the Titans.

=== New York Guardians ===
In October 2019, Ochi was drafted by the XFL to play for the New York Guardians. He was waived during final roster cuts on January 22, 2020.

=== Los Angeles Wildcats ===
Ochi signed to the XFL's Team 9 practice squad after being released by the Guardians. He was signed off of Team 9 by the Los Angeles Wildcats on March 2, 2020. He had his contract terminated when the league suspended operations on April 10, 2020.
