= The Aquatones =

American doo-wop group

- Origin: Valley Stream, New York, United States
- Genres: Doo-wop, rhythm and blues, rock and roll
- Years active: 1956–1964; 1998–present
- Labels: Fargo
- Spinoff of: The Rhythm Kings
- Members: Colette Delaney; Dave Goddard; Gene McCarthy; Larry Vannata
- Past members: Lynne Nixon

The Aquatones are an American doo-wop group that started in the 1950s. The group's lead singer was 17-year-old Lynne Nixon, a soprano who had had formal operatic training.

The Aqua-Tones had one Billboard Hot 100 hit, entitled "You", for the Fargo label. Their subsequent releases all failed to reach the Hot 100. They were issued in the early 1960s and finally on an album that gathered most of their songs, which was issued three years after their hit single, and just before their final Fargo release in July 1961, a remake of The Heartbeats' "Crazy For You". That song was not on the original album, but was included in the reissue in the 1980s.

In the late 1990s, the group re-formed with a new lead singer, Colette Delaney. They released a number of CDs on the Debra label of remakes and new material, including a Christmas album in 2006.

== Sound ==
The Aquatones were a four-part-harmony group with a female lead vocalist, Lynne Nixon (22 March 1941 – 9 January 2001). The group began in 1956 as three males from Valley Stream, New York, United States, called the Rhythm Kings; the members were Dave Goddard, Larry Vannata and Gene McCarthy. They came together to record a song written by Goddard for their junior class play at Valley Stream Central High School. All of the men played instruments as well as singing vocals — McCarthy on the clarinet and tenor sax, Vannata the alto and tenor saxophones and Goddard on piano. Bob Boden played drums when they performed live. A classmate's father, a record distributor, heard the group and suggested that they add a high falsetto voice. Shortly thereafter, Vannata met Lynne Nixon at a dance and asked McCarthy and Goddard to give her an audition. Upon hearing her voice they agreed to add her to the group. At first Nixon only sang backgrounds, until Vannata wrote the song "You" for her to sing.

The group later changed its name to the Aquatones. In 1957, the three original members added Nixon as a fourth member to give the group some versatility. It was not long after the group became a foursome that they found themselves performing at a talent contest at Malverne High School. The contest, entitled "Stairway to the Stars", was just that for the group, as local real-estate-mogul-turned-music-promoter Lou Fargo heard them and liked what he saw and heard. In December 1957, he signed the group, and they recorded on Fargo's own label.

== First record ==
Their first song was "You" (Fargo 1001 b/w "She's the One For Me"). It was a group harmony recording. The record hit on the Billboard chart in April 1958. "You" gained attention again in 1973 when it was used in the crime thriller Mean Streets, written and directed by Martin Scorsese. Such classics as "I Met Him on a Sunday" by The Shirelles, "Zoom Zoom Zoom" by The Collegians and "Sweet Little Sixteen" by Chuck Berry were out at the same time. While "You" did very well in the East, it only managed to hit No. 21 across the United States.

More recently the song was featured in the TV series Mad Men, in the episode "Five G", during a scene where Don meets his younger brother at a diner, offering him money and telling him he does not want to have anything to do with him. Later the brother commits suicide. Previously, the song was used in a similar context on the TV series The Sopranos, in the episode "Everybody Hurts", accompanying a disturbing dream sequence in which a character, Gloria Trillo, commits suicide.

"You" is also featured in the television series Vampire Diaries, season 5, episode 7 ("Death and the Maiden"). The character Silas is sitting at a bus stop talking to a young couple. He is telling them the truth about himself, which makes them believe he is crazy. He then makes the man in the couple very ill and the woman runs away. Silas then gets on a bus going to Virginia. The song plays out over opening title card.

== Follow up ==
Their follow-up record was "Say You'll Be Mine" b/w "So Fine" (Fargo 1002). Their third single was "Our First Kiss" b/w "Drive In" (Fargo 1003). Their next release, in October 1958, was "My Treasure" b/w "My One Desire" (Fargo 1005) but it received little interest. "My Darling" b/w "For You, For You" (Fargo 1111) followed, as did "Crazy For You" b/w "Wanted" (Fargo 1016) in 1961. "Crazy For You" was a cover of the original Heartbeats tune.

Fargo released an album of the group's material in 1964, as the Aquatones went their separate ways.

Lynne Nixon died in January 2001.

== Colette Delaney ==
In 1998, Goddard heard a young lady sing who sounded similar to Nixon. A year later he approached the girl, Colette Delaney, about singing in a new Aquatones group. Delaney had had a career in musical comedy and was interested in singing with the group. They started making "demo" recordings of some of the Aquatones' old music. The result was a new CD, released on Debra Records. The CD included performances from the original Aquatones — Dave Goddard, Gene McCarthy and Larry Vannata.
