= H2M Architects & Engineers =

American architecture and construction firm

H2M architects + engineers
- Formerly: Henry Holzmacher, P.E. (1933–1961); Holzmacher, McLendon, and Murrell (1961–1970)
- Type: Privately held company
- Industry: Architecture & design, engineering consulting, environment consulting, planning
- Founded: 1933; 93 years ago
- Founder: Henry "Gus" Holzmacher
- Headquarters: 538 Broadhollow Road, Melville, New York, United States
- Number of locations: 15 offices (2024)
- Area served: East Coast of the United States
- Products: Strategic consulting, planning, design, program management, engineering, construction services and operations & maintenance
- Number of employees: >500 (2023)
- Website: www.h2m.com

H2M Architects & Engineers (stylized as H2M architects + engineers and commonly known as H2M) is a major American architectural, design, engineering, construction, planning, and consulting firm headquartered in Melville, in Suffolk County, on Long Island, in New York, United States.

The firm is listed on the New York State Historic Business Preservation Registry, and it was a leading advocate in passing the federal ban on the use of lead and solder in drinking water supplies.

== History ==
=== Early years: 1933 – 1961 ===
What is now H2M was founded in 1933 by Henry “Gus” Holzmacher, P.E., as a small civil engineering and land surveying practice located in the basement of his Bethpage, New York home. The practice primarily focused on public works projects across Long Island, as well as engineering many of the island's public water supply systems. Holzmacher's first major project was received in 1935, in which he would engineer a water supply facility for the South Farmingdale Water District. Shortly thereafter, the Grumman Aircraft Engineering Corporation began hiring the firm for major projects, including topographic studies and runway improvements for its Bethpage airport & headquarters in 1944, during World War II; the aircraft manufacturer quickly became a primary client. Following World War II, the firm continued to grow rapidly.

In 1947, Holzmacher moved the firm into its first dedicated office, located in Hicksville, New York, and he shortly thereafter began hiring full-time workers. Four years later, in 1951, Holzmacher was retained as the Consulting Engineer of the Bethpage Water District, and in 1952 he designed expanded facilities for the district.

In 1953, Holzmacher's son, Robert Holzmacher, P.E., joined the firm. He was soon thereafter followed by two additional associates, Norman Murrell, P.E. and Samuel McLendon, P.E. in 1955 and 1956, respectively. The growing firm continued growing and receiving new public works engineering contracts throughout the 1950s, with additional clients including the Dix Hills Water District, the Hicksville Water District, the Plainview Water District, the South Huntington Water District, the Incorporated Village of Farmingdale, the Port Jefferson Water District, and the Smithtown Water District.

By the close of the 1950s, the firm had outgrown its Hicksville office. In 1959, ground was broken for a new headquarters in Melville, New York; the Melville office opened in 1960.

=== Holzmacher, McLendon, and Murrell: 1961 – 1970 ===
In March 1961, shortly after the opening of the firm's new Melville headquarters, Henry Holzmacher died. His son, Robert, inherited the firm, and he and the two associates shortly thereafter renamed the firm Holzmacher, McLendon, and Murrell. It then ceased to be a sole proprietorship when Robert Holzmacher made Samuel McLendon a partner.

The firm continued to grow, and in 1962 it was retained by the Town of Oyster Bay to construct the Plainview–Old Bethpage Community Park and Pool in Plainview, New York – and in 1967, it constructed a man-made lake at Byron Lake Park in Oakdale, New York. One year later, in 1968, the firm assisted Suffolk County in the 18-month Suffolk County Comprehensive Public Water Supply Study.

=== H2M: 1970–present ===
In 1970, the three engineers converted the firm from a partnership and into a professional corporation; upon the conversion into a professional corporation, the H2M name was officially adopted. Upon the passage of the Clean Water Act of 1972, H2M aided municipalities across Long Island in obtaining federal funds related to the bill. Environmental projects soon became such a major component of H2M's portfolio that it soon established a specialized environmental engineering discipline.

In 1985, H2M constructed one of the first Scavenger Waste Treatment Plants in the United States. Two years later, in 1987, the firm officially established its architectural discipline. The decade also saw H2M's headquarters relocating to another office in Melville, at 575 Broadhollow Road (NY 110), in 1988 – in addition to H2M's operations expand outside of New York, with further business commencing in New Jersey. In the 1980s, the firm also played a key role in getting local communities as well as the Federal Government to ban the use of lead and solder in public drinking water supplies.

In 1991, Holzmacher, McLendon, and Murrell retired from the firm, and Harold Dombeck, P.E. subsequently became H2M's new president and CEO. One year later, in 1992, the firm provided architectural services for the United States Postal Service in Mount Kisco, New York, and the North Massapequa Fire District in North Massapequa, New York became its first fire district client for architectural services. In 1993, it designed a new fire station for the Hicksville Fire District and in 1994, the Connetquot Central School District became the company's first school district client. In 1997, H2M established its forensic services discipline.

In 2006, H2M became the first firm in the country to develop techniques to remove perchlorate. The decade also saw the firm open a new office in Suffern, New York, to more efficiently serve the Hudson Valley.

The 2010s saw continued growth, with the firm being retained by a major developer, Uniondale, New York-based RXR Realty, to design the 244-unit Ritz Carlton Residences, located in North Hills, New York. In 2013, H2M relocated to its current headquarters, at 538 Broadhollow Road in Melville. The company opened its New York City office in 2015, followed by its Albany, New York office one year later; the Albany office eventually relocated to Troy, New York. By 2016, H2M reached a total of 300 employees, and by 2018, the company had reached 400 employees. The decade also saw the company design Station Yards – a transit-oriented development in Ronkonkoma, New York, adjacent to the Ronkonkoma Long Island Rail Road station – as well as the undertaking of sewer study surveys for Long Island municipalities.

In 2016, H2M acquired Pacheco Ross – an architectural firm specializing in designing firehouses, and in 2017, it acquired Farmingdale-based Ehasz Giacalone Architects. Two years later, in 2019, H2M acquired Valley Stream-based Frederic P. Wiedersum Associates; the firm had long been one of H2M's main architectural competitors.

In 2022, H2M opened an office in Florida. One year later, in 2023, the company celebrated its 90th anniversary. At that time, it was employing over 500 people – and by 2024, H2M operated 15 offices along the East Coast of the United States; as of 2024, the company has offices located in New York, Connecticut, Florida, New Jersey, and Pennsylvania.

In 2024, it was announced that the company's Windsor, Connecticut, office would expand. That same year, the company's Westchester County office relocated to a new space in White Plains.

As of 2024, the president and CEO of H2M is Richard Humann.

== Notable projects ==
- Hempstead Lake State Park improvements – Laveview, New York
- Jones Beach West Bathhouse renovations – Wantagh, New York (2018)
- Kings Park High School renovations – Kings Park, New York (2015)
- Malverne High School Performing Arts Center – Malverne, New York (2019)
- Manhasset Valley Park renovations & redesign – Manhasset, New York
- Shrub Oak International School – Shrub Oak, New York (2018)
- Stewart Air National Guard Base Firehouse – New Windsor, New York (2010)
- Suffolk County Community College Center for Health and Wellness – Riverhead, New York (2019)

== See also ==
- AECOM
- Bechtel
- Skidmore, Owings & Merrill
- WSP USA
