= Valley Stream 13 Union Free School District =

School district in the U.S. state of New York

Valley Stream 13 Union Free School District is a public school district in New York State that serves about 2000 students in the villages of Valley Stream and Malverne, the hamlets of Franklin Square and Elmont, and the community of North Valley Stream in Nassau County with a staff of 250 (180 teachers and 70 support staff) and a budget of $67 million. It is unique in that most school districts in New York State encompass grades K–12 while this district includes elementary grades PK–6 only. It is one of three Valley Stream districts (the others are Elementary Districts 24 and 30) whose students graduate to a separately managed district, Valley Stream Central High School District, for grades 7-12.

The average class size is 20 students (all grades). The student-teacher ratio is 12:1.

Adrienne Robb-Fund was the Superintendent of Schools.

== Board of education ==
The Board of Education (BOE) consists of 7 members who serve rotating 3-year terms. Elections are held each May for board members and to vote on the School District Budget.

== History ==
Adrienne Robb-Fund retired in 2016 after three years. Constance D. Evelyn began as superintendent in 2016 and retired from the district in January 2021. In 2021, Judith A. LaRocca was selected to replace Evelyn beginning January 15, 2021.

== Schools ==
The district operates four schools:

=== Elementary schools ===
- James A. Dever Elementary School (K-6)
- Howell Road Elementary School (PK-6)
- Wheeler Avenue Elementary School (K-6)
- Willow Road Elementary School (K-6)

=== Middle schools ===
- none, see Valley Stream Central High School District

=== High schools ===
- none, see Valley Stream Central High School District

== Performance ==
In 2003, 96% of students tested at acceptable levels 3 or 4 in Elementary-Level Social Studies. In 2008, student test scores exceeded the state average in all grades and tested subject areas of New York State standardized tests.

== See also ==
- Valley Stream 24 Union Free School District
- Valley Stream 30 Union Free School District
