= Valley Stream Central High School District =

School district in the U.S. state of New York

Coordinates: 40°40′28″N 73°42′1″W

The Valley Stream Central High School District is a public central high school district in New York State that serves about 4500 students in most of the village of Valley Stream, most of South Valley Stream, and most of North Valley Stream as well as parts of Elmont, Franklin Square, and Malverne in Nassau County. It is one of only three central high school districts in New York State. There is a nine-member Board of Education which is composed of three appointees from each of the Elementary District Boards (13,24,30).

== Schools ==
The district operates four schools, all of them secondary schools. Two are 7-12 schools that have both junior high school and senior high school (grades 7-12): Valley Stream North High School and Valley Stream South High School (7–12). Valley Stream Central High School has only senior high school grades (10-12). Valley Stream Memorial Junior High School only has junior high school grades (7-9).

=== Valley Stream Memorial Junior High School ===
Valley Stream Memorial Junior High School

Location
- 320 Fletcher Ave; Valley Stream, Nassau County, New York 11580; United States

Information
- School type: Public Government Funded
- Status: Open
- Principal: Bret Strauss
- Grades: 7th, 8th & 9th Grades
- Gender: Coeducational
- Age range: 12-15
- Classes offered: common core NYS, AP, Music, Art, Special Education
- Language: English
- Hours in school day: 7:50-2:43 (Periods 1-9) 2:43-3:13 (Extra Help Hours) 2:43-4:30 (Club Hours)
- Colors: Blue & White
- Mascot: Eagle
- Nickname: MJHS, MJH
- Team name: The Eagles
- Rival: Valley Stream North High School, Valley Stream South High School
- Feeder schools: Valley Stream District 13, Valley Stream District 24, Valley Stream District 30
- Website: https://vschsd.org/schools/memorial-junior-high-school/

Valley Stream Memorial Junior High School is the sole junior high school-only campus (grades 7–9). Students attend classes from 7:50AM (Start of Period One) to 2:43PM (End of Period Nine) Most students go to Valley Stream Central High School when finished with their 9th grade year. The school offers many clubs and extracurricular activities in various interest fields such as art, academia, sports, and social fields.

== Demographics ==
On December 3, 2006, Newsday reported that of 4,566 students, 55.5% are white, 16.3% are black 16.3% are Hispanic and 12.0% are "other."

== Feeder schools ==
Students from the following grade K–6 elementary school districts graduate to attend schools in the Valley Stream Central High School District:

- Valley Stream 13 Union Free School District
- Valley Stream 24 Union Free School District
- Valley Stream 30 Union Free School District
