= Rich Borresen =

American football player (born 1964)

No. 84
- Position: Tight end

Personal information
- Born: March 16, 1964 (age 62); Queens, New York, U.S.
- Listed height: 6 ft 2 in (1.88 m)
- Listed weight: 252 lb (114 kg)

Career information
- High school: Franklin Square (NY) Valley Stream North
- College: Northwestern
- NFL draft: 1987: undrafted

Career history
- Dallas Cowboys (1987)

Awards and highlights
- First-team All-Big Ten (1986)

Career NFL statistics
- Games played: 3
- Stats at Pro Football Reference

Richard David Borresen (born March 16, 1964) is an American former professional football player who was a tight end for the Dallas Cowboys of the National Football League (NFL). He played college football for the Northwestern Wildcats.

== Early life ==
Borresen attended Valley Stream North High School, where he participated in football and track. He enrolled at Nassau Community College, and was named the starting tight end. He transferred to Northwestern University after his first year.

He was a two-year starter and was mostly used for blocking purposes. As a sophomore, he was a backup behind Ralph Jackson, appearing in 9 games with 10 receptions for 75 yards. As a junior, he was limited with injuries, appearing in 3 games with 10 receptions for 100 yards.

As a senior, he appeared in 11 games, recording 25 receptions for 331 yards and one touchdown. Against Army, he had 6 receptions for 95 yards. He received AP second-team All-Big Ten and UPI honorable-mention All-American honors.

== Professional career ==
Borresen was signed as an undrafted free agent by the Dallas Cowboys after the 1987 NFL draft. He was waived on July 30.

After the NFLPA strike was declared on the third week of the 1987 season, those contests were canceled (reducing the 16-game season to 15) and the NFL decided that the games would be played with replacement players. He was re-signed to be a part of the Dallas replacement team that was given the mock name "Rhinestone Cowboys" by the media. He started 3 games and was used for blocking purposes, registering only a 5-yard kickoff return. He was released on October 26, at the end of the strike.

== Personal life ==
Borresen works in the construction industry, after co-founding the company PRB Innovations with his brother in 1991.
