= Valley Stream 30 Union Free School District =

School district in the U.S. state of New York

Coordinates: 40°40′21″N 73°42′32″W

Valley Stream 30 Union Free School District is a public school district in New York State that serves about 1500 students in the village of Valley Stream, New York in southeast Nassau County with a staff of 180 (121 teachers and 59 support staff). It is unique in that most school districts in New York State encompass grades K–12 while this district includes elementary grades K–6 only. It is one of three Valley Stream districts (the others are Elementary Districts 13 and 24) whose students graduate to a separately managed district, Valley Stream Central High School District, for the higher grades.

The average class size is 20 students (all grades). The student-teacher ratio is 13:1.

Dr. Roxanne Garcia-France is the Superintendent of Schools.

The District motto is "The friendly schools".

== Board of education ==
The Board of Education (BOE) consists of 5 members who serve rotating five-year terms. Elections are held each May for board members and to vote on the School District Budget.

== Schools ==
The district operates three schools:

=== Elementary schools ===
- Clear Stream Avenue School (K-6)
- Forest Road School (K-6)
- Shaw Avenue School (K-6)

== Performance ==
In 2003, 94% of students tested at acceptable levels 3 or 4 in Elementary-Level Social Studies. In 2008, student test scores exceeded the state average in all grades and tested subject areas of New York State standardized tests.

== See also ==
- Valley Stream 13 Union Free School District
- Valley Stream 24 Union Free School District
