= Ken Babby =

American businessperson

- Education: Wheaton College; Johns Hopkins University
- Occupation: CEO of the Tampa Bay Rays
- Board member of: Wheaton College Board of Trustees
- Parent: Lon Babby (father)

Ken Babby is an American businessperson and chief executive officer of the Tampa Bay Rays. Previously, Babby served as Chief Revenue Officer/ Vice President and General Manager, Digital for The Washington Post. He was the founder and chief executive officer of Fast Forward Sports Group and owner of both the Jacksonville Jumbo Shrimp (AAA Affiliate of the Miami Marlins) and the Akron RubberDucks (AA Cleveland Guardians) baseball teams until their sale in December 2025.

== Early life ==
In his youth, Ken Babby was a fan of the Baltimore Orioles. He often attended this games with his father, Lon Babby, who was General Counsel for the team, and was later president of basketball operations for the Phoenix Suns. His mother is author Ellen Babby. Babby attended Wheaton College (Massachusetts) where he graduated with a dual degree in Computer Science and Economics. Babby later graduated with an MBA from Johns Hopkins University.

== The Washington Post ==
Babby began working at The Washington Post as of 1999, beginning as an intern in the IT department, and joined the IT department full-time in 2002. He then began working in advertising, eventually becoming vice president of advertising for the Post. He remained with the Post until 2012, when he left from his position as chief revenue officer and general manager, Digital. He was the youngest senior official in the company's history.

== Minor League Baseball ==
In 2012, at the age of 32, Babby acquired the Akron Aeros Double-A minor league baseball team of the Cleveland Indians organization, and renamed the team the Akron RubberDucks in 2014. In 2016 the team won the Eastern League championship, and that same year they hosted the Eastern League All-Star Game. The team's stadium also underwent a $8.0 million privately funded renovation since Babby's ownership.

In 2015 Babby acquired the Jacksonville Suns Double-A minor league baseball team of the Southern League, a part of the Miami Marlins organization, and renamed the team the Jacksonville Jumbo Shrimp in 2016. Additionally, Babby invested $2 million renovating the team's home, the Baseball Grounds of Jacksonville. In 2020, the club announced a historic naming rights partnership with 121 Financial, renaming the ballpark 121 Financial Ballpark. The Jumbo Shrimp were invited to become the AAA Affiliate of the Miami Marlins ahead of the 2021 season.

The teams were operated by Babby's company the Fast Forward Sports Group. For both, he reduced ticket prices and revamped the concession stands, with the goal of providing a family friendly environment. In 2016 Babby was also named to the Sports Business Journal's 40 under 40 list, and a regional Ernst and Young Entrepreneur of the Year recipient.

In December 2025, both minor league teams were sold to Prospector Baseball Group.

== Major League Baseball ==
In September 2025, Babby became chief executive officer of the Tampa Bay Rays of Major League Baseball, as part of the new ownership group led by Patrick Zalupski.

== Boards ==
Babby serves on the Wheaton College board of trustees, where he is the Chair of the Audit Committee. He previously served on the MLB PDL (Professional Development League) Executive Board, the MLB PDL Governance Committee, the Jacksonville University Board of Trustees, the Board of Baptist Health System (Downtown Jacksonville Campus), the Jacksonville Chamber of Commerce, Visit Jacksonville and the Cleveland Sports Commission.

== Personal life ==
Ken is married to Liz Bryan, an executive vice president of Spectrum, and has a son. Ken is also the son of former lawyer, Washington Redskins attorney, Baltimore Orioles attorney, sports agent, and Phoenix Suns President of Basketball Operations and senior advisor in Lon Babby.
