= Valley Stream 24 Union Free School District =

School district in the U.S. state of New York

Valley Stream Union Free School District 24 is located one-half hour or less from Aqueduct Raceway, Belmont Park, Eisenhower Park, Hempstead Lake State Park, boating and swimming facilities, Westbury Music Fair, the Nassau Veteran’s Memorial Coliseum, as well as the in-town convenience Hendrickson Park and the Valley Stream Village Green.

On average, Valley Stream Union Free School District 24 is better than the state average in quality. The District motto is "We Know We Can".

== Schools ==
The district operates three schools:

=== Elementary schools ===
- Brooklyn Avenue School (K-6)
- Robert W. Carbonaro School (K-6)
- William L. Buck School (K-6)

=== Middle schools ===
- none, see Valley Stream Central High School District

=== High schools ===
- none, see Valley Stream Central High School District

== Performance ==
In 2003, 92% of students tested at acceptable levels 3 or 4 in Elementary-Level Social Studies. In 2008, student test scores exceeded the state average in all grades and tested subject areas of New York State standardized tests.

== See also ==
- Valley Stream 13 Union Free School District
- Valley Stream 30 Union Free School District
