= Valley Stream North High School =

Coordinates: 40°41′15″N 73°40′28″W

Location
- 750 Herman Avenue; Franklin Square, New York 11010; United States

Information
- School type: Public
- Opened: 1955
- Status: Open
- School district: Valley Stream Central High School District
- Principal: Robin Small
- Teaching staff: 114.25 FTEs
- Grades: 7–12
- Gender: Coeducational
- Age range: 11 to 18
- Enrollment: 1,261 (2023-2024)
- Student to teacher ratio: 11.04
- Hours in school day: 7:50 to 2:43
- Colors: Green and White
- Athletics: Football, Cross Country, Winter Track, Spring Track, Basketball, Volleyball, Soccer, Baseball, Wrestling, Tennis, Softball, Badminton, Lacrosse
- Mascot: Spartan
- Rival: Valley Stream South High School
- National ranking: 656
- Newspaper: North Star
- Yearbook: The Chariot
- Clubs: Student Council, Grade Council, SADD, STOP, Spartan Update, North Star, Art Club, Drama Club, GSA, Ecology Club, Many Honor Societies, SPO, 7:10 Downbeats, Jazz Band, Homework Club, Table Tennis, Women's Choir
- Website: Valley Stream North High School

Valley Stream North High School (also known as North High School and abbreviated VSNHS) is a combined public junior and senior high school located in the hamlet of Franklin Square in southwestern Nassau County, on Long Island, in New York, United States.

== Overview ==
Valley Stream North High School is one of three high schools in the Valley Stream Central High School District. Like Valley Stream South High School, Valley Stream North High School is a combined junior-senior high school that educates grades seven through twelve. Students who attend Valley Stream North High School are mainly graduates of the local Franklin Square, North Valley Stream, and Elmont elementary schools, including Willow Road Elementary School, James A. Dever Elementary School, and Howell Road Elementary School. Students who attend Valley Stream North High School reside in either Franklin Square, Malverne, North Valley Stream, or Elmont. Valley Stream North High School is known to the local population simply as "North."

As of the 2014–15 school year, the school had an enrollment of 1,281 students and 95.8 classroom teachers (on an FTE basis), for a student–teacher ratio of 13.4:1. There were 178 students (13.9% of enrollment) eligible for free lunch and 43 (3.4% of students) eligible for reduced-cost lunch.

== History ==
Valley Stream North High School was built in 1955 – at the same time as South High School. Both schools are similar in architecture and were designed by Valley Stream-based Frederic P. Wiedersum Associates.

== Notable alumni ==
- Rich Borresen, former NFL player
- Jim Ferry, Assistant Coach of Men's Basketball at Penn State
- Alice Hoffman, American novelist and young-adult and children's writer
- Atoosa Rubenstein, magazine editor
- Rick Shutter, drummer and percussionist in the original New York production of Godspell
- Mike Witteck, former NFL player
