= South Valley Stream, New York =

- Hamlet and census-designated place
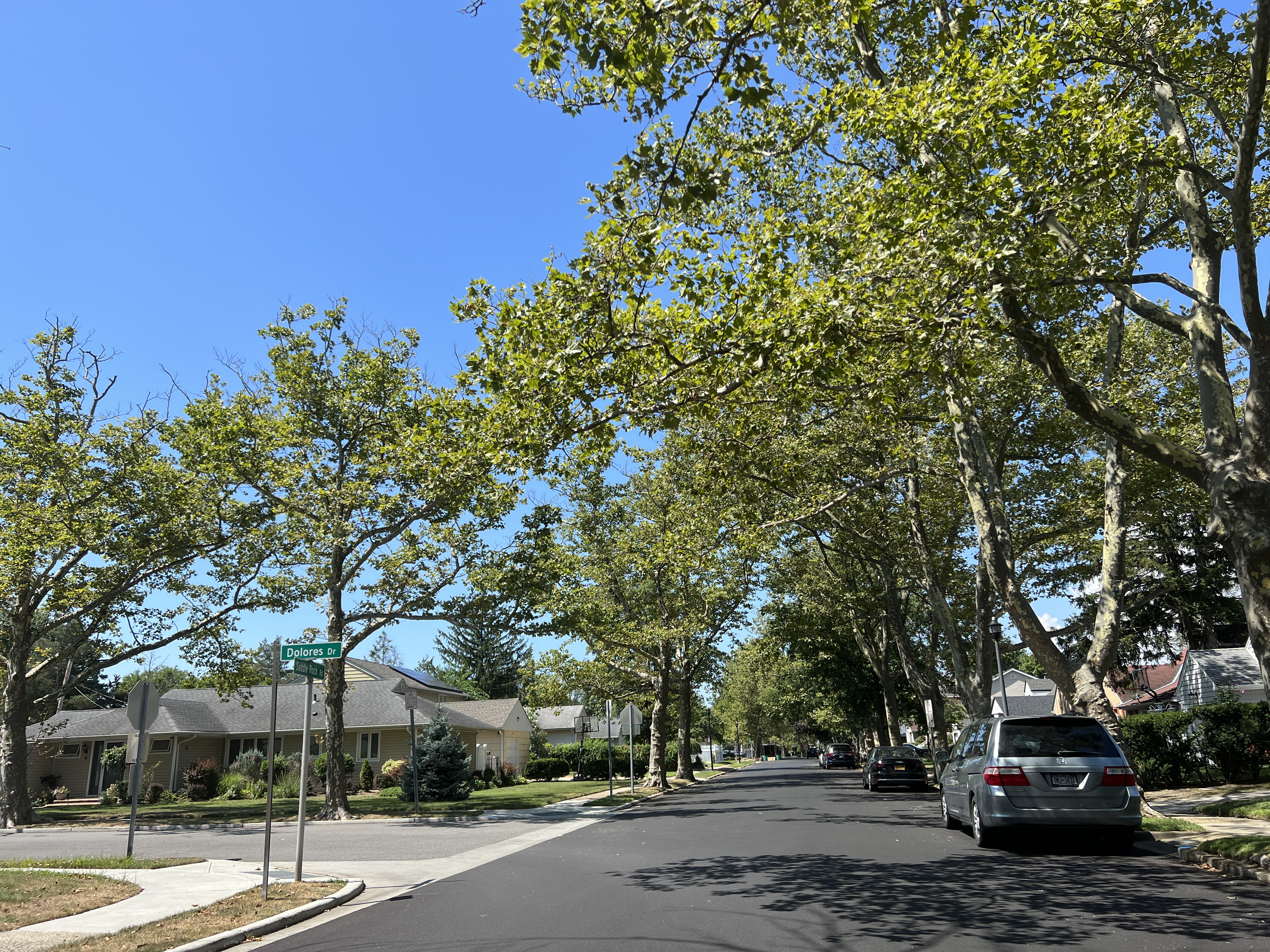
- Saddle Rock Road in South Valley Stream on August 8, 2022.

- Location in Nassau County and the state of New York

- Location on Long Island Location within the state of New York
- Coordinates: 40°39′10″N 73°43′6″W
- Country: United States
- State: New York
- County: Nassau
- Town: Hempstead
- Named after: Its location south of Valley Stream

Area
  - Total: 0.87 sq mi (2.25 km^{2})
  - Land: 0.87 sq mi (2.25 km^{2})
  - Water: 0 sq mi (0.00 km^{2})
- Elevation: 6.6 ft (2 m)

Population (2020)
  - Total: 6,386
  - Density: 7,342.3/sq mi (2,834.86/km^{2})
- Time zone: UTC-5 (Eastern (EST))
  - Summer (DST): UTC-4 (EDT)
- ZIP Code: 11581 (Valley Stream)
- Area codes: 516, 363
- FIPS code: 36-69892
- GNIS feature ID: 1867419

South Valley Stream is an unincorporated hamlet and census-designated place (CDP) in the Town of Hempstead in Nassau County, on Long Island, in New York, United States. The population was 6,386 at the time of the 2020 census.

South Valley Stream is located in the southern part of the Town of Hempstead, and consists of two unincorporated areas, North Woodmere and Mill Brook.

== Geography ==
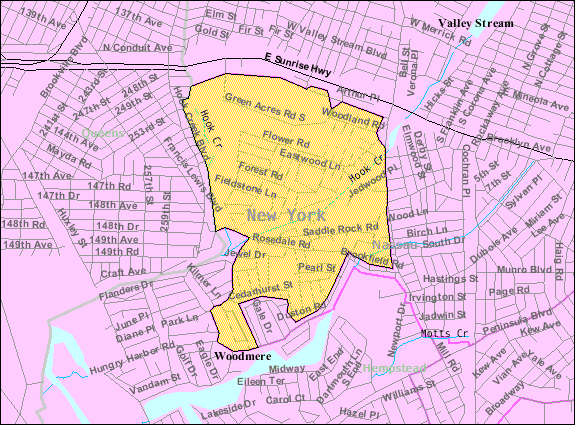
U.S. Census map of South Valley Stream.

According to the United States Census Bureau, the CDP has a total area of 0.9 square miles (2.3 km^{2}), all land.

== Economy ==
The Green Acres Mall is located along the border of the hamlet and the Village of Valley Stream.

== Demographics ==
Historical population
Census	Pop.	Note	%±
2010	5,962		—
2020	6,386		7.1%
U.S. Decennial Census

As of the census of 2010, there were 5,962 people, 1,969 households, and 1,554 families residing in the CDP. The population density was 6,415.1 inhabitants per square mile (2,476.9/km^{2}). There were 2,045 housing units at an average density of 2,326.9 per square mile (898.4/km^{2}). The racial makeup of the CDP was 51.90% White, 23.10% African American, 0.07% Native American, 18.10% Asian, 0.00% Pacific Islander, 4.40% from other races, and 2.20% from two or more races. Hispanic or Latino of any race were 9.80% of the population.

There were 1,969 households, out of which 35.40% had children under the age of 19 living with them, 65.20% were married couples living together, 10.20% had a female householder with no husband present, and 21.10% were non-families. 18.70% of all households were made up of individuals living alone, and 11.70% had someone living alone who was 65 years of age or older. The average household size was 3.02 and the average family size was 3.46.

In the CDP, the population was spread out, with 26.20% under the age of 19, 5.80% from 20 to 24, 21.30% from 25 to 44, 30.80% from 45 to 64, and 15.90% who were 65 years of age or older. The median age was 42.5 years. The population consists of 52% females, and 48% males.

The median income for a household in the CDP was $108,995, and the median income for a family was $118,750.

== Education ==
The northern portion of the hamlet is served by Valley Stream South High School and Forest Road Elementary School, while the southern portion, south of Rosedale Road, is served by George W. Hewlett High School, Woodmere Middle School, and Ogden Elementary School.

== Notable people ==
- Lon Babby – President of the Phoenix Suns.
- Jeffrey M. Friedman – Discoverer of Leptin.
- Esther Jungreis – Founder of Hineni.
- Larry Miller – Comedian/actor.
- Gary Portnoy – Singer/songwriter, most notably the performer of the Cheers theme song.
- Seth Rudetsky – Composer, musical director and talk show host.
