= Franklin Square, New York =

- Hamlet and census-designated place
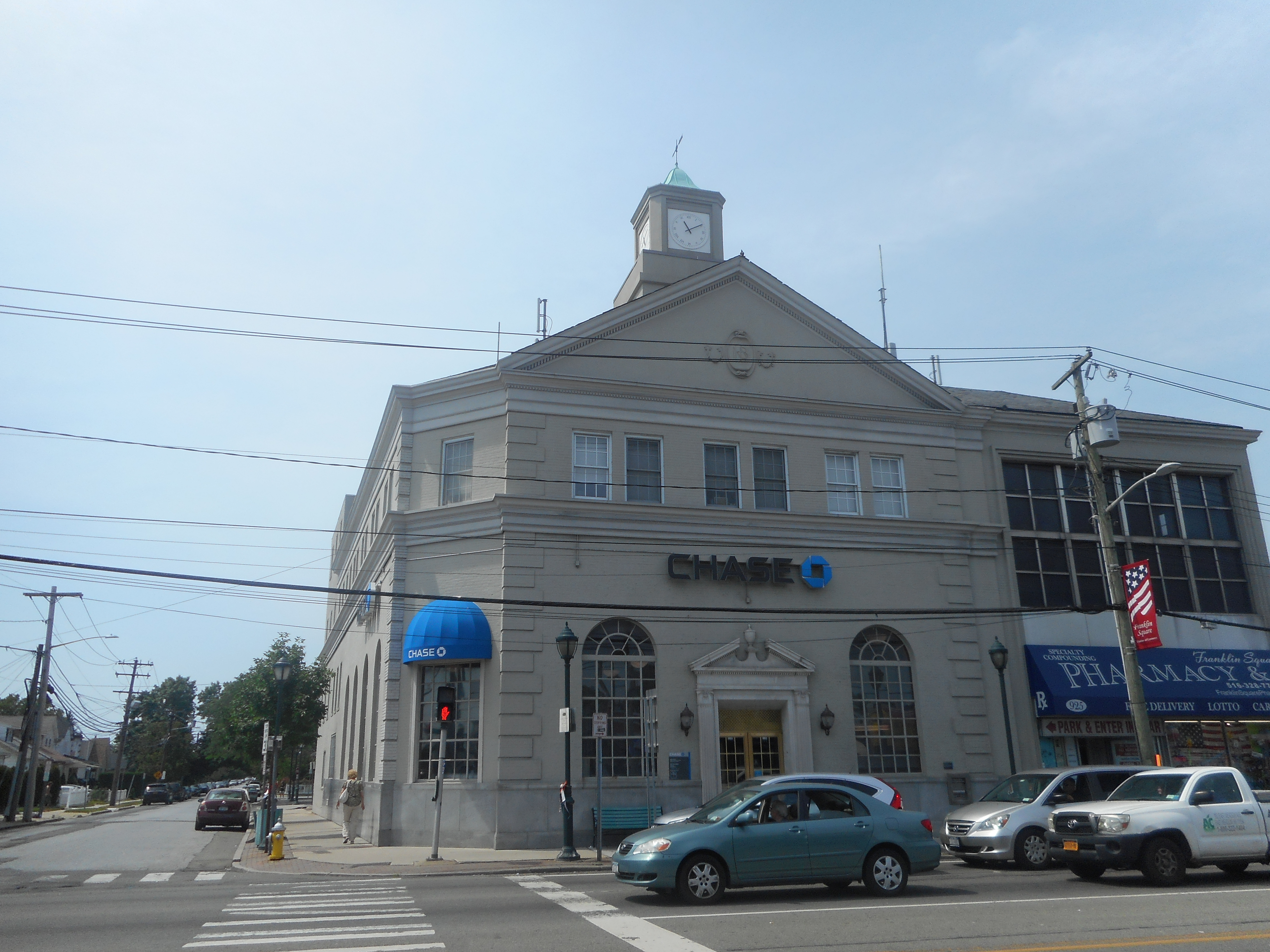
- The landmarked Franklin National Bank building (now a Chase bank) in Franklin Square, in 2016

- Location in Nassau County and the state of New York

- Location on Long Island Location within the state of New York
- Coordinates: 40°42′6″N 73°40′36″W
- Country: United States
- State: New York
- County: Nassau
- Town: Hempstead
- Named for: Benjamin Franklin

Area
  - Total: 2.88 sq mi (7.46 km^{2})
  - Land: 2.88 sq mi (7.46 km^{2})
  - Water: 0 sq mi (0.00 km^{2})
- Elevation: 66 ft (20 m)

Population (2020)
  - Total: 30,903
  - Density: 10,730.6/sq mi (4,143.09/km^{2})
- Time zone: UTC−5 (Eastern (EST))
  - Summer (DST): UTC−4 (EDT)
- ZIP Codes: 11010 (Franklin Square); 11001 (Floral Park); 11003 (Elmont); 11530 (Garden City); 11580 (Valley Stream)
- Area codes: 516, 363
- FIPS code: 36-27309
- GNIS feature ID: 0950629

Franklin Square is a hamlet and census-designated place (CDP) within the Town of Hempstead in Nassau County, on Long Island, in New York, United States. The population was 30,903 at the time of the 2020 census.

The area was originally known as Trimming Square and then as Washington Square after President George Washington.

== History ==
What is now Franklin Square was near the center of the Hempstead Plains, and used as grazing land, and later farmland, by the first white settlers. The southern portion included oak and dogwood forests.

In late 1643, Robert Fordham and John Carman made a treaty with members of the Massapequak, Mericoke, Matinecock and Rockaway tribes to buy roughly 100 square miles upon which they intended to start a new settlement. They purchased this tract, including much of what is now the towns of Hempstead and North Hempstead.

In 1790, George Washington passed through the town while touring Long Island. He wrote in his diary that the area was "entirely treeless except for a few scraggly fruit trees." Walt Whitman spent three months in the spring of 1840 as the schoolmaster of the Trimming Square school district, in the area where Franklin Square, Garden City South and West Hempstead intersect.

In 1852, one Louis Schroeher built a hotel near a tollgate (by what is now Arden Boulevard) of the Hempstead-Jamaica Turnpike (toll road). The hotel attracted an increasing number of visitors and immigrants (the latter often German) from New York City to the formerly rural hamlet.

The population grew steadily until the sudden intensified surge of suburbanization in post-World War II Long Island reached the community. By 1952, the farms were all gone, replaced by newly built houses full of emigrants from nearby New York City.

=== Etymology ===
It is rumored that the original name for the area, Trimming Square, reflected the fact that farms once dominated the area's landscape (as was common for areas all across the Hempstead Plains), and because many sheep were brought to the area by local farmers for separation during the latter parts of the 18th Century. The Trimming Square name was used between the early 19th Century and 1851 when the name was changed to Washington Square after George Washington.

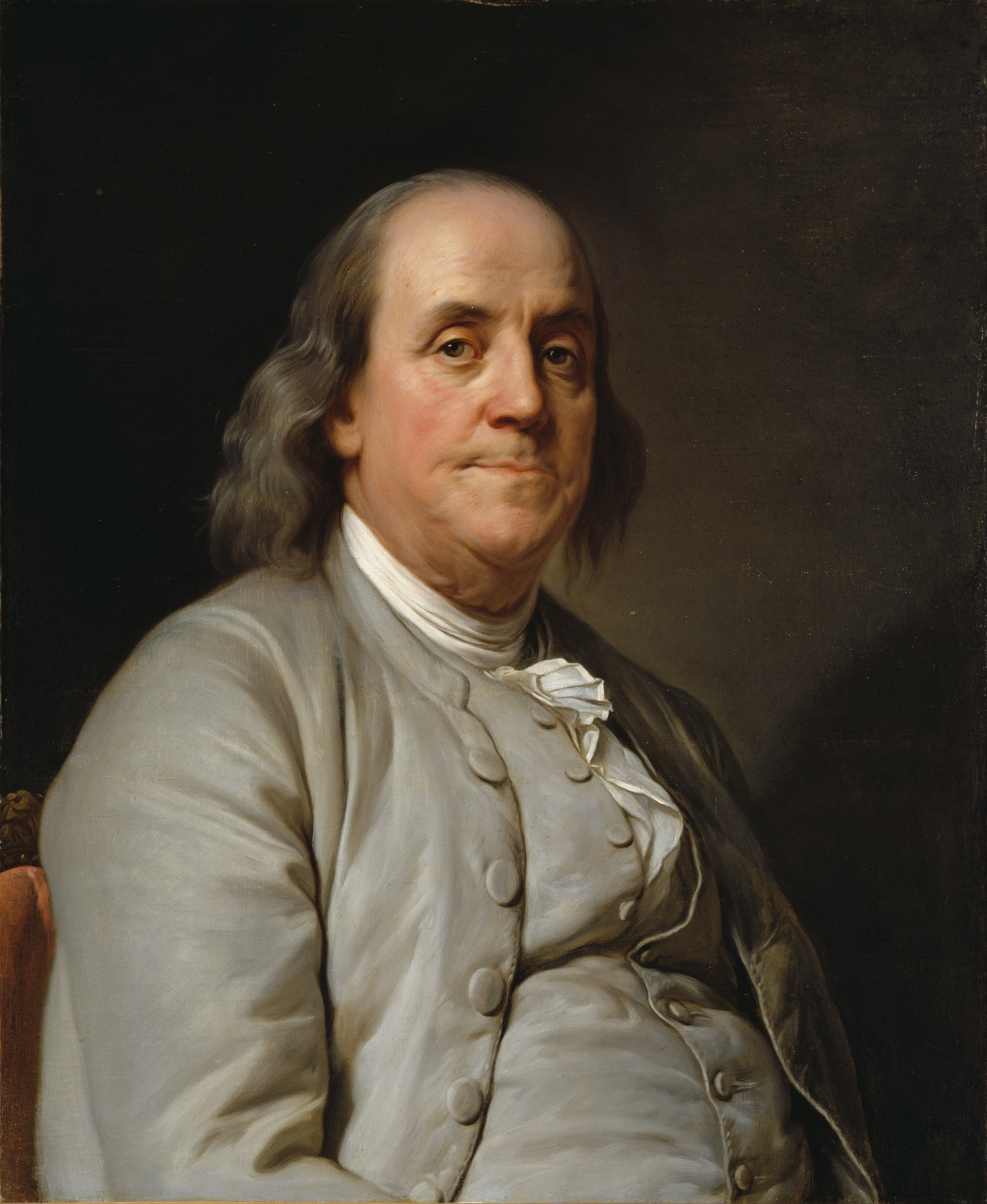
Benjamin Franklin

The name of the community was again changed in the 1870s when locals made strides to establish a local U.S. post office. The United States Postal Service would not use the name Washington Square, as they felt that there were too many other places within New York that had Washington in their names. This led to locals again changing the name, and they ultimately chose the name Franklin Square. It is rumored that the name is in honor of Benjamin Franklin.

=== Failed incorporation attempt ===
In February 1929, locals tried incorporating their community as the Incorporated Village of Franklin Square. However, the plans were scrapped that April when the Town of Hempstead denied the petition, because too few residents were in favor of incorporation.

== Geography ==
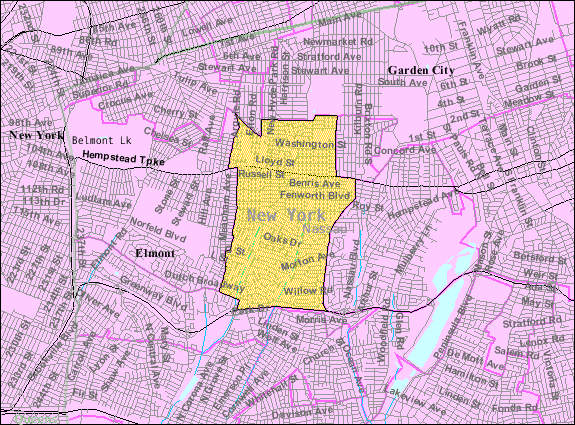
U.S. Census map of Franklin Square

According to the United States Census Bureau, the CDP has a total area of 2.9 square miles (7.5 km^{2}), all land.

Franklin Square is bordered on the north by Stewart Manor, northeast by Garden City and Garden City South, southwest by North Valley Stream, east by West Hempstead, and west by Elmont.

== Demographics ==
Historical population
Census	Pop.	Note	%±
2000	29,342		—
2010	29,320		−0.1%
2020	30,903		5.4%
U.S. Decennial Census

=== 2020 census ===
As of the 2020 census, Franklin Square had a population of 30,903. The median age was 43.3 years. 19.3% of residents were under the age of 18 and 19.5% of residents were 65 years of age or older. For every 100 females there were 92.5 males, and for every 100 females age 18 and over there were 90.1 males age 18 and over.

100.0% of residents lived in urban areas, while 0.0% lived in rural areas.

There were 9,903 households in Franklin Square, of which 33.9% had children under the age of 18 living in them. Of all households, 58.1% were married-couple households, 13.4% were households with a male householder and no spouse or partner present, and 24.4% were households with a female householder and no spouse or partner present. About 17.8% of all households were made up of individuals and 10.5% had someone living alone who was 65 years of age or older.

There were 10,231 housing units, of which 3.2% were vacant. The homeowner vacancy rate was 0.8% and the rental vacancy rate was 3.0%.

Racial composition as of the 2020 census
Race	Number	Percent
White	19,730	63.8%
Black or African American	1,490	4.8%
American Indian and Alaska Native	257	0.8%
Asian	3,979	12.9%
Native Hawaiian and Other Pacific Islander	9	0.0%
Some other race	2,518	8.1%
Two or more races	2,920	9.4%
Hispanic or Latino (of any race)	5,979	19.3%

=== 2010 census ===
As of the 2010 United States census, the population was 29,320. The makeup of the population was 75.1% Non-Hispanic White, 3.2% African American, 0.11% Native American, 7.2% Asian, 0.01% Pacific Islander, 1.75% from other races, and 2% from two or more races. Hispanic or Latino of any race were 13.3% of the population.

=== 2000 census ===
As of the 2000 United States census there were 29,342 people, 10,187 households and 7,833 families residing in the CDP. The population density was 10,169.2 inhabitants per square mile (3,926.4/km^{2}). There were 10,364 housing units at an average density of 3,591.9 per square mile (1,386.8/km^{2}). The racial makeup of the CDP was 93.97% White, 0.99% African American, 0.11% Native American, 1.79% Asian, 0.01% Pacific Islander, 1.75% from other races, and 1.38% from two or more races. Hispanic or Latino of any race were 6.89% of the population.

There were 10,187 households, out of which 31.4% had children under the age of 18 living with them, 62.9% were married couples living together, 10.4% had a female householder with no husband present, and 23.1% were non-families. Of all households, 19.9% were made up of individuals, and 11.3% had someone living alone who was 65 years of age or older. The average household size was 2.87 and the average family size was 3.30.

In the CDP, the population was spread out, with 22.0% under the age of 18, 7.1% from 18 to 24, 29.6% from 25 to 44, 22.7% from 45 to 64, and 18.6% who were 65 years of age or older. The median age was 39 years. For every 100 females, there were 89.9 males. For every 100 females age 18 and over, there were 86.3 males.

The median income for a household in the CDP was $80,164, and the median income for a family was $87,485 as of 2007. Males had a median income of $50,805 versus $35,207 for females. The per capita income for the CDP was $24,149. About 3.7% of families and 5.0% of the population were below the poverty line, including 4.8% of those under age 18 and 7.7% of those age 65 or over.

Franklin Square has large Italian-American (40%), Irish-American (16%) and German-American (11%) populations. The growing Jewish population is served by one Conservative and seven Orthodox synagogues. An eruv surrounds most of Franklin Square and adjoining West Hempstead.

== Arts and culture ==
=== Landmarks ===
Franklin Square was the home of the Franklin National Bank, once the nation's 20th-largest bank. Under the leadership of Arthur T. Roth, the Franklin National Bank introduced many banking innovations, such as the bank credit card, the drive-up teller window (1950), junior savings accounts (1947), and a no-smoking policy on banking floors (1958). Today, the building is a Chase bank.

On October 8, 1974, the Franklin National Bank was declared insolvent due to mismanagement and fraud, involving losses in foreign currency speculation and poor loan policies. This caused massive losses for its stockholders and resulted in jail and disgrace for its management; Italian financier and CEO Michele Sindona was poisoned in his cell in 1986, while serving a life sentence for his part in this affair. It was at the time the largest bank failure in the history of the country and forced US banking policymakers to reexamine and reassess the regulation of international banking.

The building was listed on the National Register of Historic Places in 2015.

In October 2019, the Town of Hempstead designated the Franklin Square Movie Theater, located at 989 Hempstead Turnpike, as a historical landmark. Built in 1933, the Art Deco building is one of the few remaining examples of the architectural style in the town. The landmark status followed applications submitted by local residents and community organizations, including the Community League of Garden City South.

=== Community organizations ===
There is an active Chamber of Commerce and a historical society The Community League of Garden City South, Is the first New York State Incorporated Civic of Long Island, established in 1929. As the oldest acting Civic, originally serving all of Nassau County, in 1942, they narrowed their demographics to serve Franklin Square School District #17. The Community League of Garden City South, Inc. Is a direct liaison between the residents/merchants and the State and Local Governments as well as other Organizations. It is their honor to act on behalf of the people to maintain and preserve the quality of life within the district. Franklin Square Civic Association, established in 2016 by a group of residents within the community, serves to maintain and improve the quality of life within the community. The organization sponsors several events to bring the community together.

Community League of Garden City South, Inc.

Franklin Square has the Franklin Square Warriors youth football program, Franklin Square Raiders youth soccer program, the Franklin Square Little League, and Franklin Square Seminoles II baseball and softball club.

== Government ==
As part of the Town of Hempstead, Franklin Square is located within the town's 3rd council district, through which it is represented on the Hempstead Town Council by Melissa Miller. Furthermore, as part of New York's 4th congressional district, the hamlet is represented by Laura Gillen.

== Parks and recreation ==
The Town of Hempstead Department of Parks and Recreation operates and maintains two parks in Franklin Square: Averill Boulevard Park and Rath Park.

The Averill Boulevard Park features a playground, a swimming pool, walking paths & nature trails, and sports facilities.

Rath Park includes a swimming pool, a playground, football & baseball fields, and basketball, handball, & tennis courts. Furthermore, there is a snack commissary and recreational equipment rental facility that operates during the summer, while the pool is operational.

== Education ==
=== Schools ===
==== Public schools ====
Franklin Square is served by the following:

- Three elementary school districts (Franklin Square Union Free School District, Valley Stream 13 Union Free School District, and Elmont Union Free School District)
- Two central high school districts (Sewanhaka Central High School District for the Franklin Square SD and Elmont UFSD parts, and the Valley Stream Central High School District for the Valley Stream 13 part).

The Valley Stream Union Free School District 13 covers the four public elementary schools in Franklin Square (Willow Road School is located in Franklin Square under Valley Stream District) and two public high schools (North Valley Stream H.S. is located in Franklin Square under Valley Stream District). The Franklin Square Union Free District 17 covers Washington Street School, John Street Elementary School, H. Frank Carey High School, and Polk Street School. District 16 (Elmont School district), covers the western part, with most students attending Covert Ave School and Sewanhaka High School.

Below are the schools in Franklin Square, and their respective grade levels and districts.

School	Grades	District	Funding
Polk Street School	K–6	Franklin Square Union Free School District	Public
Willow Road School	K–6	Valley Stream 13 Union Free School District	Public
John Street School	K–6	Franklin Square Union Free School District	Public
Washington Street School	K–6	Franklin Square Union Free School District	Public
Valley Stream North High School	7–12	Valley Stream Central High School District	Public
H. Frank Carey Junior-Senior High School	7–12	Sewanhaka Central High School District	Public

==== Private schools ====
The private St. Catherine of Sienna Elementary School was once located within the hamlet. It closed in June 2012.

=== Library districts ===
Franklin Square residents are served by two public libraries: the Elmont Library District (served by the Elmont Public Library) and the Franklin Square Library District (served by the Franklin Square Public Library).

== Media ==
Franklin Square had a print weekly newspaper, the Franklin Square Bulletin, and is covered by another local print and online newspaper, the Three Village Times.

== Infrastructure ==
Franklin Square has a volunteer fire department and is served by the Nassau County Police Department's Fifth Precinct.

Sanitation and recycling services are provided by the Town of Hempstead District 6.

== Notable people ==
- Bruce Arena, United States men's national soccer team coach.
- Michele Aquino, soccer player
- Nikki Blonsky, an American actress, singer, and dancer, best known for her role as Tracy Turnblad in the 2007 film Hairspray and as Maggie Baker in the 2008 film Queen Sized.
- Joseph Duszak (born July 22, 1997), American professional ice hockey player
- Randy Gordon (March 11, 1949 in Brooklyn, N.Y), New York State Boxing Commissioner, ESPN Boxing Commentator, New Jersey Boxing Hall of Fame Inductee, Sirius XM radio Host.
- Sean Hannity, an American radio and television host, author and political commentator.
- Ray Heatherton (of The Merry Mailman television show) and daughter Joey Heatherton lived on James Street.
- Alice Hoffman (born March 16, 1952), novelist and young-adult and children's writer, best known for her 1996 novel Practical Magic, which was adapted for a 1998 film of the same name.
- Mike Massimino, NASA Astronaut, a graduate of H. Frank Carey Junior-Senior High School and the Massachusetts Institute of Technology.
- Lisa Matassa, country singer.
- Shane Pinto, NHL player for the Ottawa Senators
- Barbara Rosenthal, the New York avant-garde artist who wrote a weekly column ("A Crack in the Sidewalk") for The Franklin Square Bulletin in 1959–1961, when she was only eleven.
- Jeff Tamarkin, a music journalist and award-winning author of the Jefferson Airplane biography Got a Revolution.
- Michael Tucci (born April 15, 1946), an American film, TV and stage actor, played Sonny in the 1978 version of "Grease" with John Travolta.
- Al Weis, former Major League Baseball player with the Chicago White Sox and New York Mets.
