= Valley Stream South High School =

Coordinates: 40°39′15″N 73°42′50″W

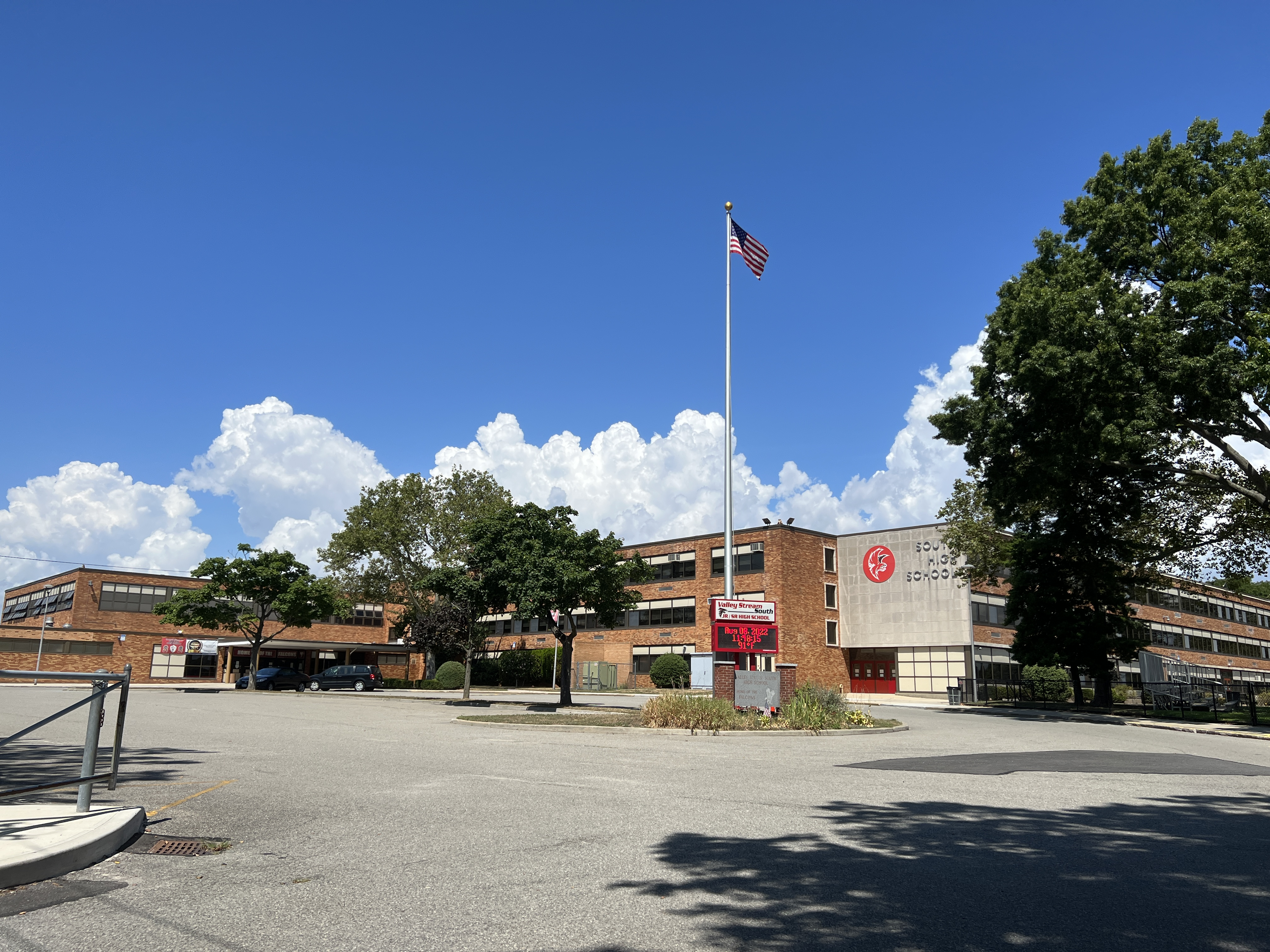
- Valley Stream South High School in August 2022.

Location
- 150 Jedwood Place; Valley Stream, New York 11581; United States

Information
- School type: Public
- Opened: 1955
- School district: Valley Stream Central High School District
- Principal: Matthew Swinson
- Teaching staff: 104.03 FTEs
- Grades: 7–12
- Gender: Coeducational
- Enrollment: 1,247 (2023-2024)
- Student to teacher ratio: 11.99
- Colors: Red and white
- Mascot: Falco the Falcon
- Team name: The Falcons
- Website: Valley Stream South High School

Valley Stream South High School (also known as South High School and abbreviated as VSSHS) is a combined public junior and senior high school located in the hamlet of South Valley Stream in Nassau County, on the South Shore of Long Island, in New York, United States. The school was established in 1955.

== Overview ==
The high school is one of three high schools in the Valley Stream Central High School District as well as one of two combined junior-senior high schools which educate grades seventh through twelfth. Students who attend Valley Stream South High School are mainly graduates of the local South Valley Stream elementary schools, including William L. Buck Elementary School, Brooklyn Avenue Elementary School, Forest Road Elementary School, and Robert W. Carbonaro Elementary School which is approximately 600 feet to the junior-senior high school complex. Valley Stream South High School is known to the local population simply as "South".

As of the 2022-23 school year, the school had an enrollment of 1,224 students and 105.08 classroom teachers (on an FTE basis), for a student–teacher ratio of 11.65:1. There were 431 students (35.2% of enrollment) eligible for free lunch and 26 (2.1% of students) eligible for reduced-cost lunch.

The school's official colors are red and white. The school's mascot is the falcon.

== History ==
Valley Stream South High School was built in 1955, at the same time as North High School. Both schools were originally similar in architecture and were designed by Valley Stream-based Frederic P. Wiedersum Associates – and they were arch rivals in to sporting events. During the 2007–2008 school year, South's athletics division was changed to Division 3 due to the size of the student body. The school has three floors and was originally designed in the shape of a cube with a landscaped courtyard in the center.

== School demographics ==
Valley Stream South is one of the most diverse public high schools in New York according to Niche, ranking 9th most diverse in the state, 5th most diverse outside of New York City, and 98th most diverse in the United States as of 2021.

- Hispanic = 29.8% of students
- African American/Non-Hispanic = 27.2% of students
- Asian/Pacific Islander = 23.8% of students
- White/Non-Hispanic = 18.2% of students

== Newsweek rankings ==
South was ranked as one of the top high schools in the country according by Newsweek magazine. Since Newsweek started ranking high schools in 1999, South has ranked as one of the top 300 public high schools in America, until 2012, as well as one of the top 25 public high schools on Long Island. In April 2014, Valley Stream South was ranked as the 16th best public high school on Long Island, but was not one of the top 500 best high schools in America according to Newsweek. As can be seen below, since 2000 the national ranking of Valley Stream South High School has fallen 1172 ranks over 25 years time.

South was ranked, according to Newsweek:

- 41st best high school in America in 1999
- 33rd best high school in America in 2000
- 152nd best high school in America in 2005
- 264th best high school in America in 2006
- 294th best high school in America in 2007
- 299th best high school in America in 2010
- 333rd best high school in America in 2012
- 456th best high school in America in 2013
- 1205th best high school in America in 2025

== The Falcon Report ==
The Falcon Report began broadcasting on November 22, 2002, as a 7- to 10-minute student-made weekly TV news report shown school-wide on Fridays at 8:28 during homeroom period (As of 2020, the show is shown at 7:50 AM during homeroom or viewed on the YouTube channel). All activity at South comes to a halt during the broadcast as all students and faculty watch the show. Full-footage news coverage is provided on 4 to 7 issues that are prominent in the mainstream news that week. Other elements typically shown are student-made commercials, a weather report, and a sports segment. Topics frequently covered include school events, recent trips, innovative projects in various classes, and unique happenings at the school. Taping of the show occurs throughout the week. The logo of the program is the symbol and mascot of Valley Stream South High School, a falcon.

== Notable alumni ==
- Lon Babby, president of the Phoenix Suns
- Deborah Oppenheimer, Academy Award Winner for her documentary, Into the Arms of Strangers: Stories of the Kindertransport
- Gary Portnoy, singer/songwriter, most notably the performer of the Cheers theme song, "Where Everybody Knows Your Name"
- Larry Miller, comedian and actor, notably in Pretty Woman, Law & Order, Boston Legal, Bee Movie, The Princes Diaries, Seinfeld and 10 Things I Hate About You
