= Lon Babby =

American lawyer (born 1951)

- Born: Lon Scott Babby; February 21, 1951 (age 75)
- Education: Lehigh University (BA); Yale Law School (JD)
- Occupations: Lawyer; NBA player agent
- Children: Ken Babby

Lon Scott Babby (born February 21, 1951) is an American lawyer and NBA player agent. He was named the Phoenix Suns President of Basketball Operations in July 2010. However, as of June 2015, he had been moved to the team's senior adviser instead, and he stepped down from his position altogether a year later.

== Career ==
After graduating from Valley Stream South High School, Babby earned a Bachelor of Arts in political science from Lehigh University in 1973 and a Juris Doctor from Yale Law School in 1976. Early in his career, Babby represented John Hinckley Jr., the man who tried to assassinate President Ronald Reagan. He is best known as an NBA player agent, whose clients included Tim Duncan, Hedo Türkoğlu and Ray Allen, as well as former Suns player Grant Hill. Additionally, he has also represented Major League Baseball clients, and has worked as an attorney for the NFL's Washington Redskins (1977–80) and MLB's Baltimore Orioles (1979–94). He is also the father of businessman Ken Babby.

On July 20, 2010, Babby was named the Phoenix Suns President of Basketball Operations under team owner Robert Sarver after Steve Kerr left his role as general manager in June 2010 and Sarver made the lambasted decision to make sign-and-trades to acquire Josh Childress, Hakim Warrick, and Hedo Türkoğlu as the intended replacements for star power forward Amar'e Stoudemire. Despite being named the President of Basketball Operations, he still had to respond to the actual general manager of the team throughout his tenure, which originally was Lance Blanks before Ryan McDonough took over in 2013. However, he was the key speaker for the franchise during press conferences early on in his tenure despite being second-in-command to Blanks. Fans of the franchise took notice to his nasally sounding voice during that period of time. Near the end of his tenure with the Suns, Babby was demoted to being a senior advisor for the franchise on June 10, 2015, due to McDonough's expanding coverage within the franchise. Babby ultimately stepped down from his position with the team altogether on May 5, 2016.

Babby has since worked with the Positive Coaching Alliance under their local board members as well as the Be A Leader Foundation in their board of directors and the Arizona Community Foundation after stepping down from the Suns. He has also been inducted into the George Washington Jewish Sports Hall of Fame in 2007 for his contributions to the world of sports before his time with the Suns.
