= Valley Stream, New York =

- Village
- Incorporated Village of Valley Stream
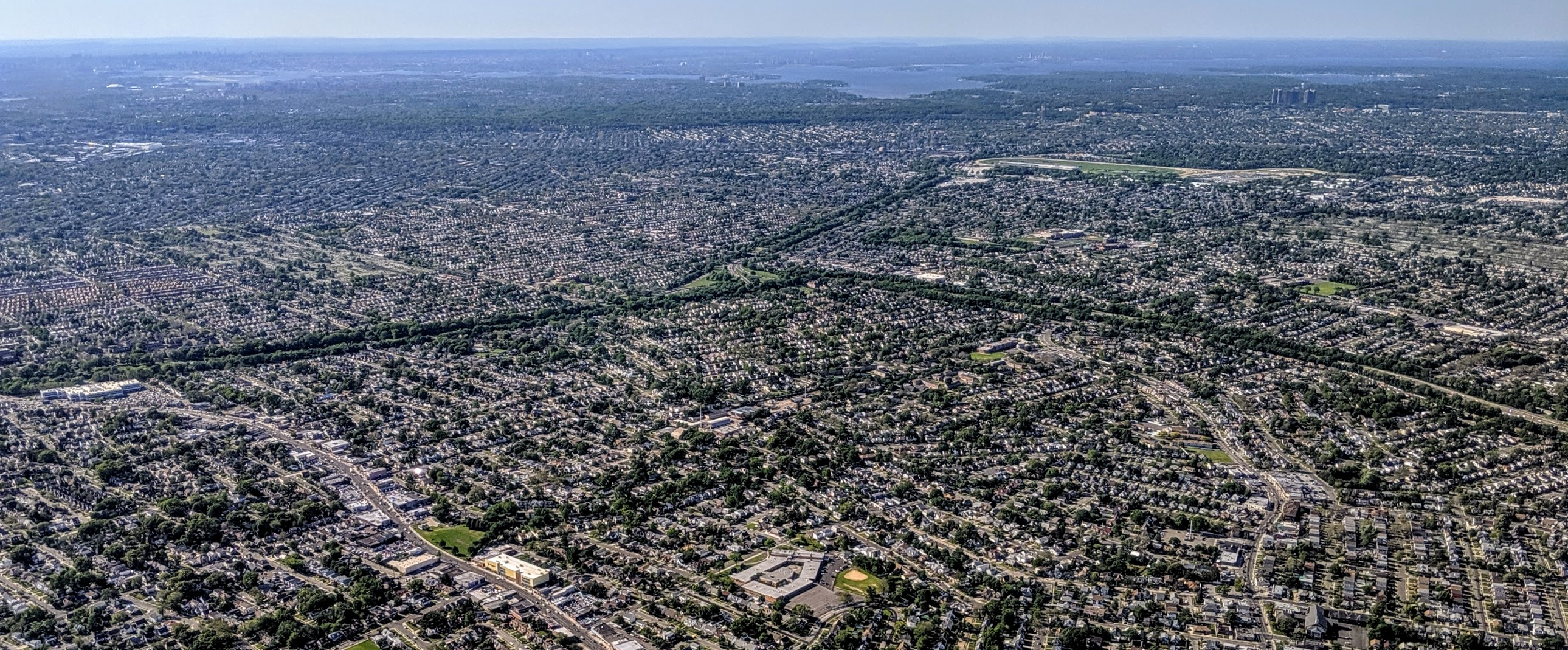
- Valley Stream and the surrounding areas, as seen from the air.

- Seal

- Location in Nassau County and the state of New York

- Location on Long Island Location within the state of New York
- Coordinates: 40°39′53″N 73°42′12″W
- Country: United States
- State: New York
- County: Nassau
- Town: Hempstead
- Incorporated: February 14, 1925
- Named for: Valley Stream Brook

Government
  - Mayor: Edwin A. Fare
  - Deputy Mayor: John Tufarelli

Area
  - Total: 3.49 sq mi (9.05 km^{2})
  - Land: 3.48 sq mi (9.01 km^{2})
  - Water: 0.015 sq mi (0.04 km^{2})
- Elevation: 16 ft (5 m)

Population (2020)
  - Total: 40,634
  - Density: 11,683.9/sq mi (4,511.16/km^{2})
- Time zone: UTC-5 (EST)
  - Summer (DST): UTC-4 (EDT)
- ZIP codes: 11580-11583
- Area codes: 516, 363
- FIPS code: 36-76705
- GNIS feature ID: 2391182
- Website: valleystreamny.gov

Valley Stream is a village in Nassau County, on Long Island, in New York, United States. The population in the Village of Valley Stream was 40,634 at the time of the 2020 census.

The Incorporated Village of Valley Stream is within the Town of Hempstead, along the border with Queens, and is served by the Long Island Rail Road at the Valley Stream, Gibson, and Westwood stations.

== History ==
In the year 1640, 14 years after the arrival of Dutch colonists in Manhattan (New Amsterdam), the area that is now Valley Stream was purchased by the Dutch West India Company from Rockaway Native Americans, they were part of the Algonquian-speaking Lenape people. Reckouwacky, or the modern translation, Rockaway, means “place of our own people,” "sandy place," or “place of laughing waters”

With populations concentrated to the west, this woodland area was not developed for the next two centuries. The census of 1840 lists approximately 20 families, most of whom owned large farms. At that time, the northwest section was called "Fosters Meadow". What is now the business section on Rockaway Avenue was called "Rum Junction", because of its taverns. The racy northern section was known as "Cookie Hill", and the section of the northeast that housed the local fertilizer plant was called "Skunks Misery". Hungry Harbor, a section that has retained its name, was home to a squatters' community.

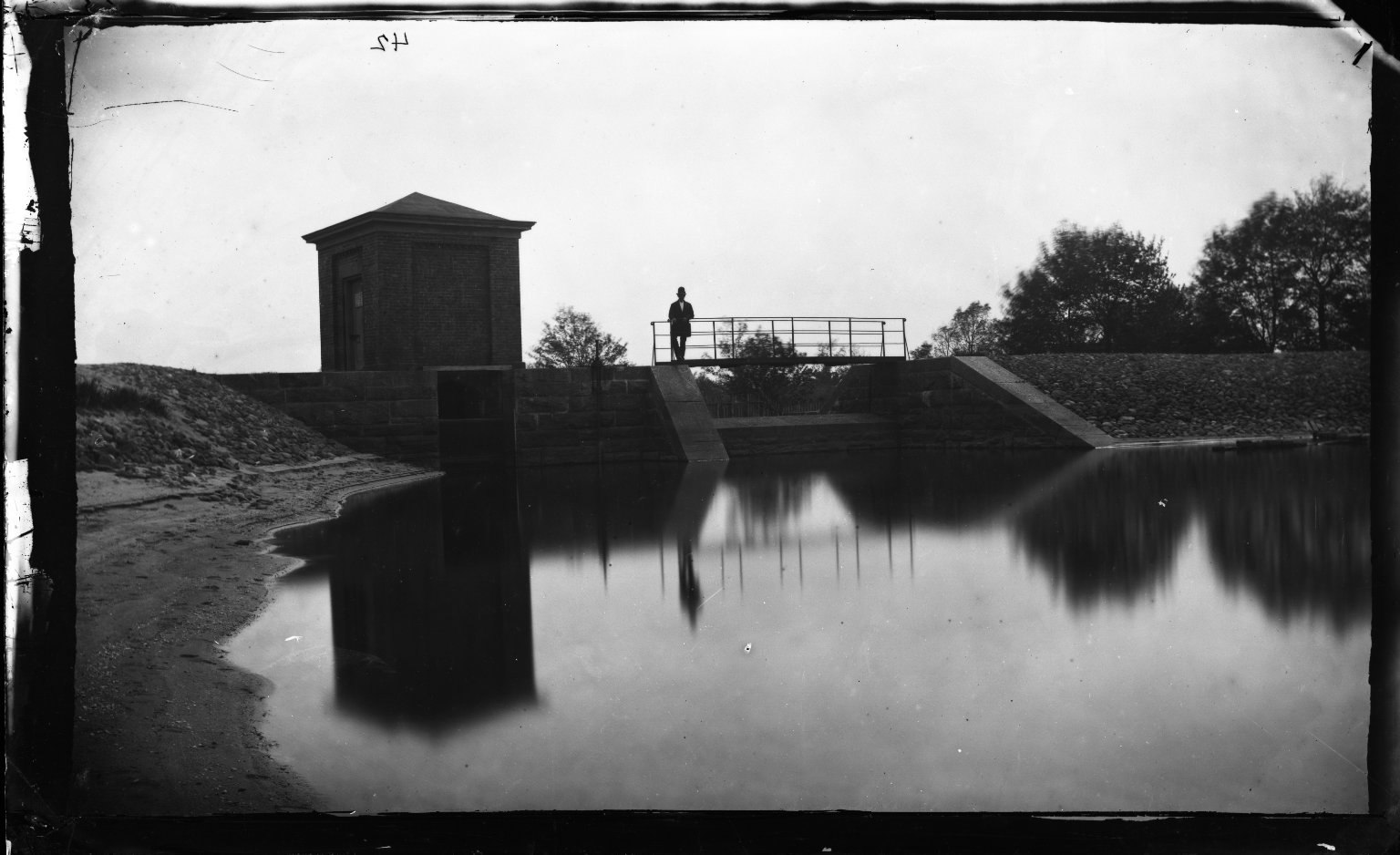
George Bradford Brainerd (American, 1845–1887). Gate House, Valley Stream, Long Island, ca. 1872–1887. Collodion silver glass wet plate negative, Brooklyn Museum.

Robert Pagan was born in Scotland on December 3, 1796. In or about the late 1830s, Robert, his wife Ellen, and their children emigrated from Scotland. On the journey to the United States, one of their children died and was buried at sea. The 1840 U.S. Census for Queens County lists Pagan's occupation as a farmer. Two children were born to Robert and Ellen Pagan after they settled in the Town of Hempstead.

At this time, the community did not have a post office, so residents had to pick up their mail in the village of Hempstead. After Pagan petitioned authorities for a post office, he was appointed postmaster and it was based in his farmhouse, now known as the Pagan-Fletcher House. He was advised that the community needed a name. Pagan chose "Valley Stream" based on the topographical appearance of the area and because of the Valley Stream Brook, which runs through it. In 1843, the U.S. Post Office formally accepted the name of Valley Stream. As a consequence, Pagan is credited with naming the community. Pagan died on March 25, 1870.

His wife, Ellen, also played a significant role in early village history. Tired of traveling to Lynbrook for religious services, she began holding services in her home. A Methodist minister was hired for periodic stops at the Pagan home, and the first congregation in Valley Stream was founded.

In 1853, Hempstead Turnpike was the only road that connected Valley Stream to Jamaica and New York City. The main streets in Valley Stream that connected the small village to the turnpike were Mill Road (which is Corona Avenue today) in the west, Sand Street (Central Avenue) in the south, and Dutch Broadway in the north. That year Merrick Road, a planked, one-lane road, was constructed through Valley Stream, connecting the village to Merrick in the east and Jamaica to the west. With the new thoroughfare in the area, Valley Stream residents and industry began to move southward.

In 1869, the South Side Railroad began stopping in Valley Stream and a branch of the railroad was constructed to connect the main line with the Rockaways. The new branch is now called the Far Rockaway Branch of the Long Island Rail Road.

In 1910, the Long Beach Branch began extending to Valley Stream, when the line was extended westward from Lynbrook and electrified, integrating it with the LIRR Atlantic Branch. This move allowed for direct service from Long Beach to Valley Stream, connecting it to the larger commuter network.

The new railroad, combined with the emergence of Merrick Road as a major artery, stimulated growth in Valley Stream, and it became a substantial community. Around the start of the 20th century, Hendrickson Park was a prime vacationing destination for people from Brooklyn and Queens. The Valley Stream Hotel opened at the beginning of the 20th century, overlooking the golf course. Many tourists who came to visit wound up moving to Valley Stream. The Village of Valley Stream was incorporated on February 14, 1925, as a result of its growth.

In 1922, developer William R. Gibson came to Valley Stream after building more than 2,500 houses in Queens. He bought 500 acres (2.0 km^{2}) of land on Roosevelt Avenue and built homes on Avondale, Berkeley, Cambridge, Derby, and Elmwood streets. Many descendants of immigrants moved into the area. Five years later, he expanded his development to Cochran Place and Dartmouth Street. Realizing that his development was perfectly designed for white-collar commuters, he petitioned the Long Island Rail Road for a stop. The LIRR agreed to stop in the area if Gibson built the station himself. On May 29, 1929, the Gibson station was opened. Gibson station, as it became known, retains the name of its founder.

In 1984, President Ronald Reagan addressed Temple Hillel in Valley Stream at the invitation of Rabbi Morris Friedman, father of Ambassador David Friedman, which was the first time since President George Washington a sitting American President addressed a Jewish congregation at their house of worship.

== Geography ==
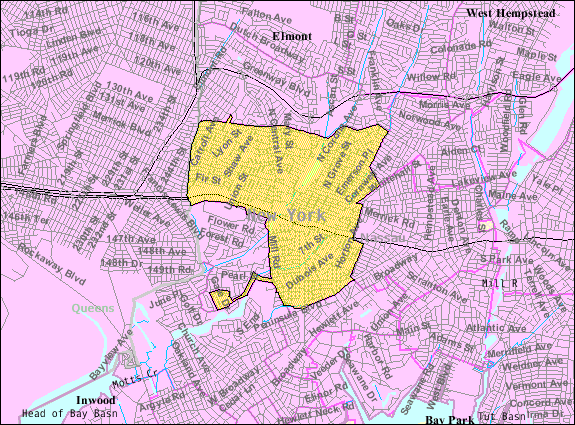
U.S. Census map of Valley Stream

According to the United States Census Bureau, the village has a total area of 3.5 square miles (9.1 km^{2}), of which 3.4 square miles (8.8 km^{2}) is land and 0.04 square miles (0.10 km^{2}), or 0.86%, is water.

Communities bordering Valley Stream are Elmont (home of Belmont Park racetrack), Lynbrook, Malverne, Franklin Square, Hewlett, Woodmere, and Rosedale (a neighborhood in Queens in New York City).

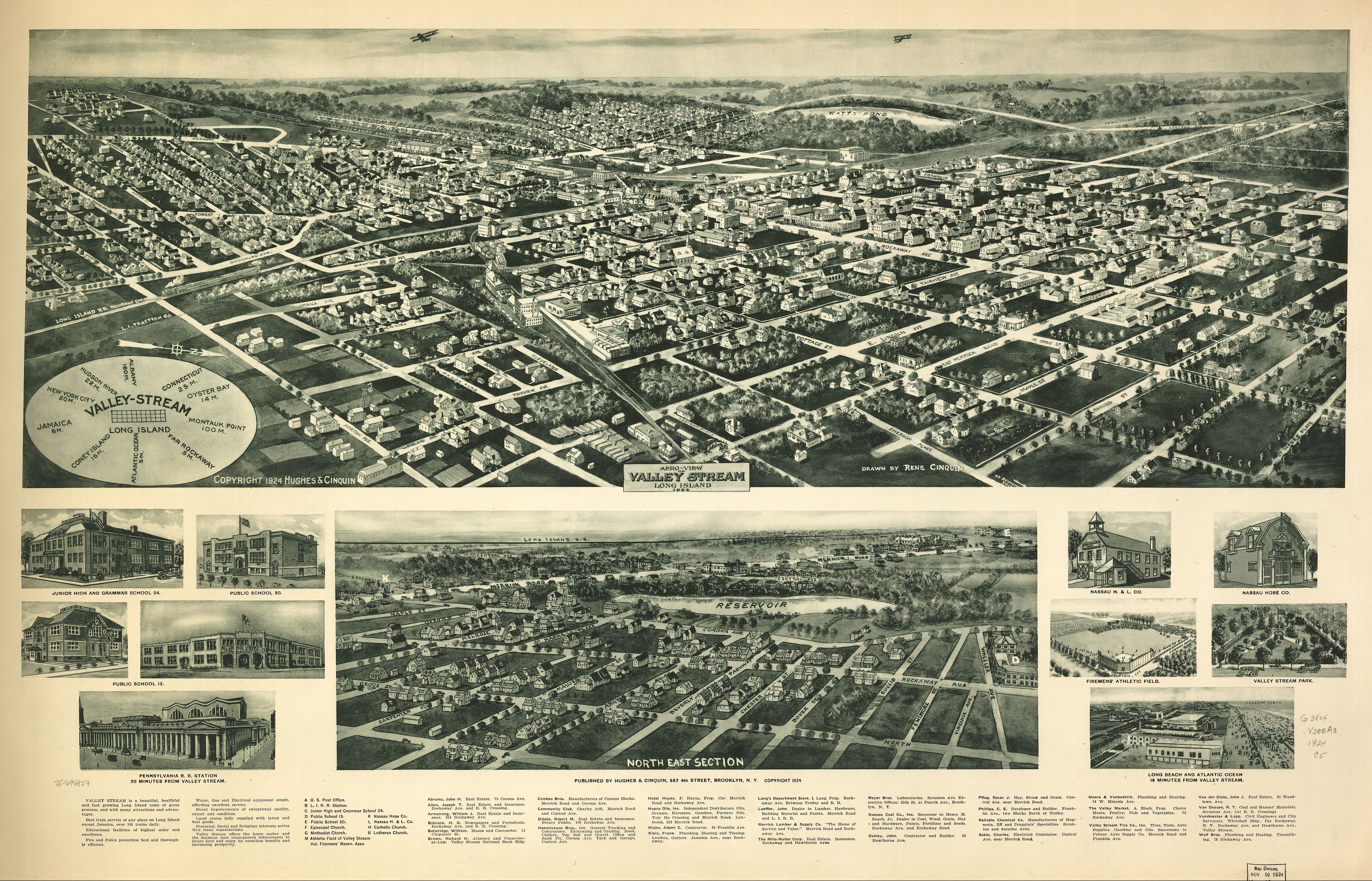
1924 Panoramic map of Valley Stream with brief description, list of landmarks, and inset images

== Demographics ==
Historical population
Census	Pop.	Note	%±
1880	605		—
1930	11,790		—
1940	16,679		41.5%
1950	26,854		61.0%
1960	38,629		43.8%
1970	40,413		4.6%
1980	35,769		−11.5%
1990	33,946		−5.1%
2000	36,368		7.1%
2010	37,426		2.9%
2020	40,634		8.6%
U.S. Decennial Census

=== 2020 census ===
As of the 2020 census, Valley Stream had a population of 40,634. The median age was 40.1 years. 21.5% of residents were under the age of 18 and 15.4% of residents were 65 years of age or older. For every 100 females there were 91.0 males, and for every 100 females age 18 and over there were 88.3 males age 18 and over.

100.0% of residents lived in urban areas, while 0.0% lived in rural areas.

There were 12,494 households in Valley Stream, of which 39.1% had children under the age of 18 living in them. Of all households, 55.5% were married-couple households, 13.6% were households with a male householder and no spouse or partner present, and 26.6% were households with a female householder and no spouse or partner present. About 17.2% of all households were made up of individuals and 8.9% had someone living alone who was 65 years of age or older.

There were 12,925 housing units, of which 3.3% were vacant. The homeowner vacancy rate was 1.0% and the rental vacancy rate was 3.4%.

Racial composition as of the 2020 census
Race	Number	Percent
White	12,848	31.6%
Black or African American	9,845	24.2%
American Indian and Alaska Native	325	0.8%
Asian	6,556	16.1%
Native Hawaiian and Other Pacific Islander	29	0.1%
Some other race	6,303	15.5%
Two or more races	4,728	11.6%
Hispanic or Latino (of any race)	10,672	26.3%

=== 2010 census ===
As of the 2010 census, there were 37,511 people, 12,484 households, and 9,600 families residing in the village. The population density was 10,569.5 inhabitants per square mile (4,080.9/km^{2}). There were 12,688 housing units at an average density of 3,687.5 per square mile (1,423.8/km^{2}). The racial make up of the village was 57.25% White, 18.57% African American, 0.3% Native American, 11.38% Asian, 8.97% from other races and 3.47% from two or more races. Hispanic or Latino were 22.24% of the population. The median household income was $62,243 and the family income was $72,585.

There were 12,484 households, of which 33.9% had children under the age of 18 living with them, 61.5% were married couples living together, 11.5% had a female householder with no husband present, and 23.1% were non-families. 20.2% of all households were made up of individuals, and 11.3% had someone living alone who was 65 years of age or older. The average household size was 2.91 and the average family size was 3.37.

In the village, the population was spread out, with 23.5% under the age of 18, 7.7% from 18 to 24, 29.1% from 25 to 44, 23.4% from 45 to 64, and 16.3% who were 65 years of age or older. The median age was 39 years. For every 100 females, there were 91.4 males. For every 100 females age 18 and over, there were 87.0 males.

=== Income and poverty ===
Median household income for the village was $77,905, and the median income for a family was $84,273.

Males had a median income of $80,094 versus $56,260 for females. The per capita income for the CDP was $66,334. About 1.0% of families and 1.8% of the population were below the poverty line, including 1.4% of those under age 18 and 0.4% of those age 65 or over.

=== 2000 census ===
The village is home to significant Italian American, Irish American and German American populations, with 31.8% of the population identifying themselves as being of Italian ancestry in the 2000 census.

== Transportation ==
=== Road ===
- NY 27
- Peninsula Boulevard (CR 2)
- Mill Road/Central Avenue
- Merrick Road
- Southern State Parkway

=== Bus ===
- n1: Elmont & East Rockaway
- n4: Jamaica & Freeport
- Elmont Flexi: New Hyde Park & Green Acres Mall
- n25 (Weekends n25/58): Great Neck Plaza & Lynbrook
- Q5: Jamaica & Green Acres Mall (weekends only)
- Q87: Jamaica & Green Acres Mall
- Q89: Jamaica & Green Acres Mall
- Q111: Jamaica & South Valley Stream

=== Rail ===
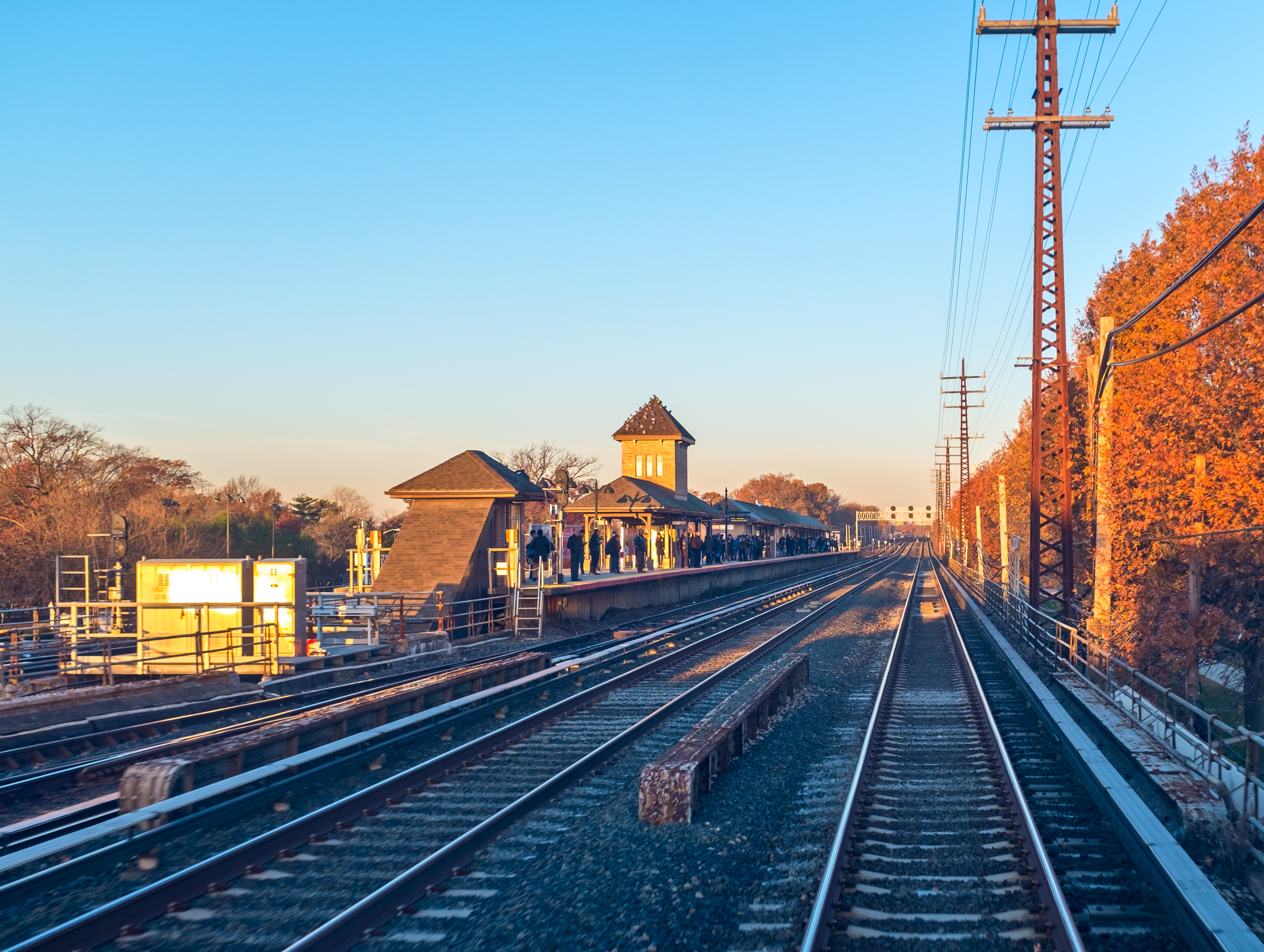
The Valley Stream station on the LIRR.

- LIRR Far Rockaway Branch: Valley Stream, Gibson.
- LIRR Long Beach Branch: Valley Stream
- LIRR West Hempstead Branch: Valley Stream, Westwood.

== Education ==
Valley Stream has many separate elementary school districts (the Valley Stream 13, 24, and 30 Union Free School Districts) which share the same central high school district: the Valley Stream CHSD.

In addition, children living in some of the southern portions of the Village are instead zoned to attend the Hewlett-Woodmere Union Free School District's schools.

=== Hewlett-Woodmere Union Free School District 14 ===
- Franklin Early Childhood Center
- Ogden Elementary School
- Hewlett Elementary School
- Woodmere Middle School
- George W. Hewlett High School

=== Valley Stream School Union Free School District #13 ===
- Howell Road Elementary School
- James A. Dever Elementary School (Originally Corona Ave Elementary School)
- Wheeler Avenue Elementary School
- Willow Road Elementary School

=== Valley Stream Union Free School District #24 ===
- Brooklyn Avenue Elementary School
- Robert W. Carbonaro Elementary School
- William L. Buck Elementary School

=== Valley Stream Union Free School District #30 ===
- Clearstream Avenue Elementary School
- Forest Road Elementary School
- Shaw Avenue Elementary School

=== Valley Stream Central High School District ===
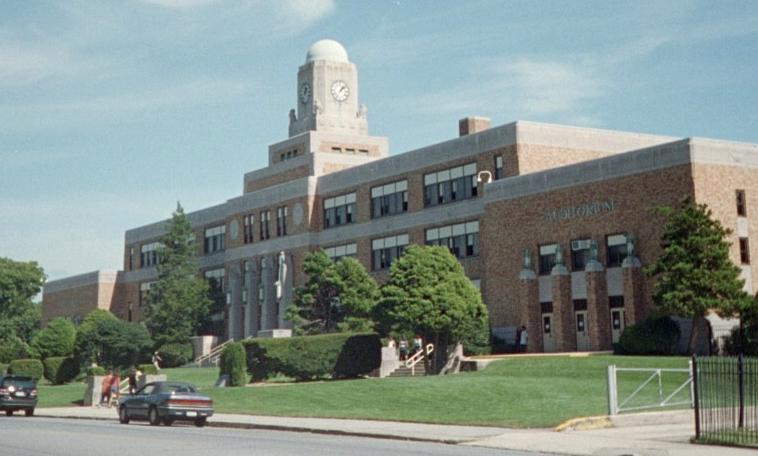
The front of Valley Stream Central High School.

- Valley Stream Central High School
- Valley Stream Memorial Junior High School
- Valley Stream North High School
- Valley Stream South High School
- Twilight Alternative Program

== Economy ==
- Green Acres Mall is partially located in Valley Stream.
- National Amusements Movie Theater chain started in Valley Stream.
- Ninety-Nines were started in Valley Stream.
- Snapple Beverage Co. – and the drink, itself – started in Valley Stream.

== Films ==
Portions of the films Married to the Mob, Goodfellas, Trees Lounge, The Brothers McMullen, The Lords of Flatbush, Frankenhooker and Desperate Endeavors were filmed in Valley Stream. Also, Valley Stream is the setting for a section of The Honeymoon Killers. The Netflix show Maniac, and Ed Burns show Bridge and Tunnel (TV series) filmed some scenes in Valley Stream.

== Notable people ==
- Fred Armisen, actor/comedian, raised in Valley Stream
- Lon Babby, president of the Phoenix Suns, grew up in Valley Stream
- Andy Dolich, sports executive, grew up in Valley Stream
- Peter Barton, actor, raised in Valley Stream
- Bruce Blakeman, politician, lawyer raised in Valley Stream
- Robert Blakeman, politician, lived most of his life in Valley Stream
- Stephen Boyd, professional football player, raised in Valley Stream
- Michael Brandon, actor, raised in Valley Stream
- Jason Michael Brescia, director, raised in Valley Stream
- Edward Burns, actor and director, grew up in Valley Stream and continues to film projects there.
- Brian Burns, actor, raised in Gibson (brother of Edward Burns)
- Jim Breuer, actor/comedian, raised in Valley Stream
- Steve Buscemi, actor/director, grew up in Valley Stream
- Eileen Charbonneau, novelist, grew up in Valley Stream
- Patricia Charbonneau, actress, grew up in Valley Stream
- Carolyn Craig, actress, known for House on Haunted Hill and Giant. Born in Valley Stream
- Jordan Dingle (born 2000), college basketball player for the Penn Quakers of the Ivy League.
- Everlast, singer and rapper, born in Valley Stream
- Fern Fitzgerald, actress. born in Valley Stream
- Jeffrey M. Friedman, scientist, discoverer of Leptin, raised in Valley Stream
- Mary Gordon, author, lived as a youth and attended elementary school in Valley Stream
- Tom Gorman, baseball player. Resident of Valley Stream at time of his death
- Gene Gotti, mobster and brother of former Gambino Crime Family Boss John Gotti, lived in Valley Stream
- Henry Hill, former mob associate with the Lucchese crime family, whose life in the mob was documented in the book Wiseguy: Life in a Mafia Family by Nicholas Pileggi, which was later adopted into the Martin Scorsese film Goodfellas, lived in Valley Stream.
- Steve Hytner, actor, grew up in Valley Stream
- Al Iaquinta, fighter on The Ultimate Fighter, grew up in Valley Stream
- George E. Killian, president of FISU, born and raised in Valley Stream
- Esther Jungreis, founder of Hineni, lived in Valley Stream
- Wendy Kaufman aka The Snapple Lady, spokesperson for Snapple, grew up in Valley Stream
- Cyndi Lauper lived on the west side of Valley Stream before becoming famous.
- Larry Miller, comedian and actor, grew up in Valley Stream
- Leslie Moonves, Former president of CBS, grew up in Valley Stream
- Deborah Oppenheimer Academy Award-winning film and television producer, grew up in Valley Stream
- Rita Moreno lived in North Valley Stream.
- Steve Orich, Tony-nominated orchestrator, grew up in Valley Stream
- Orio Palmer, fireman who died while rescuing World Trade Center occupants on 9/11
- Naomi Osaka, professional tennis player, grew up in Valley Stream
- Ralph Penza, TV news correspondent, grew up in Valley Stream
- Edward Renehan, writer, grew up in Valley Stream
- Owen Roizman, Oscar-winning cinematographer, grew up in Valley Stream
- Matt Rubano, bassist for Taking Back Sunday, born in Valley Stream
- Adam Schefter, NFL reporter for ESPN, grew up in Valley Stream
- Shaggy, reggae singer, lives in Valley Stream
- Greg Smith, bassist/vocalist for Ted Nugent, Alice Cooper, and Rainbow, grew up in Valley Stream
- Robin Wilson, lead singer for the Gin Blossoms, lives in Valley Stream
- Douglas Yeo (born 1955), bass trombonist
