= Sagaponack Historic District =

Historic district in New York, United States

- U.S. National Register of Historic Places
- U.S. Historic district
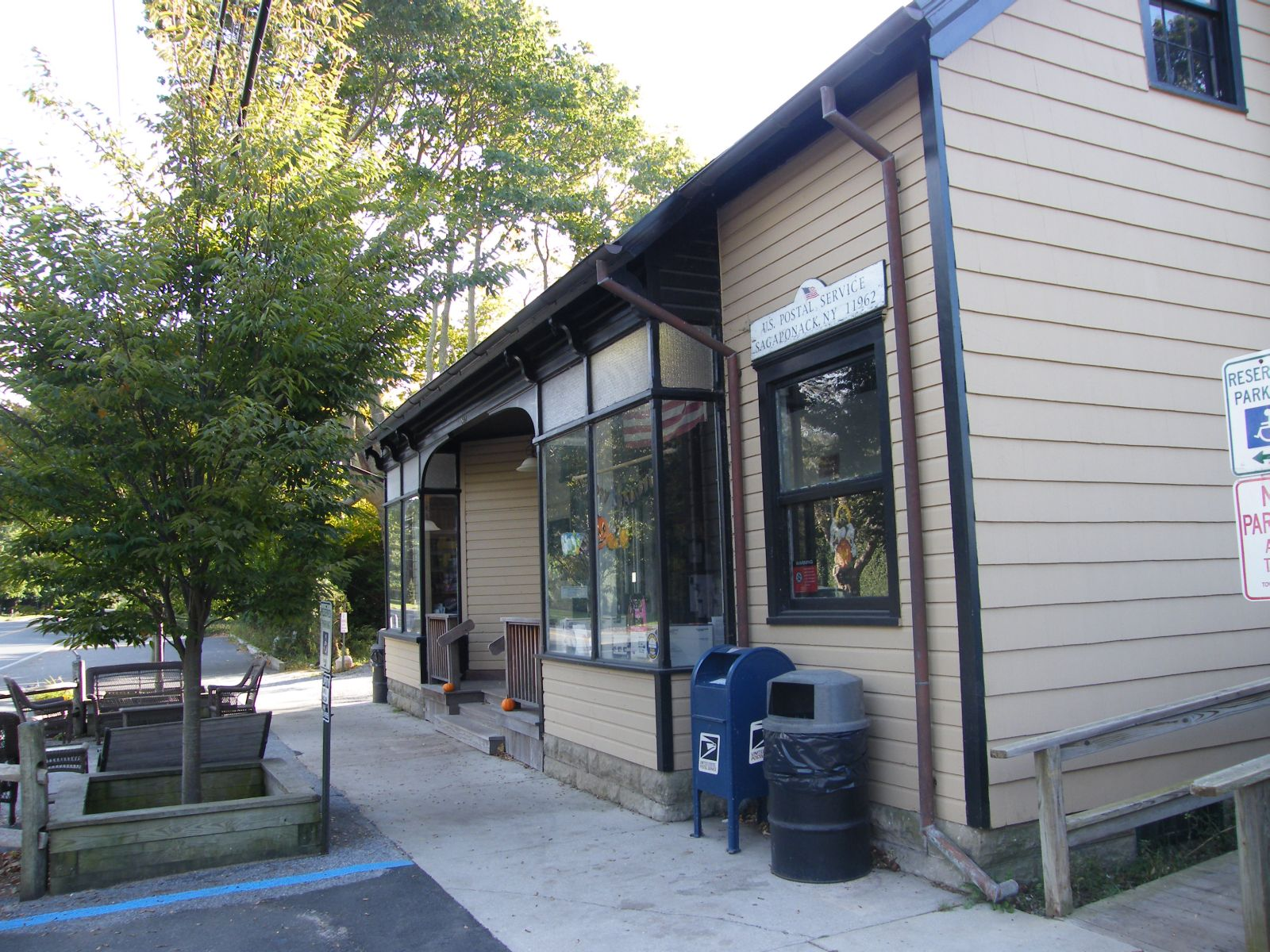
- U.S. Post Office, Sagaponack NY, October 2008

- Location within New York Location within the United States
- Location: Roughly along Main St., Sagaponack, New York
- Coordinates: 40°55′29″N 72°16′40″W
- Area: 307 acres (124 ha)
- Architect: Ware, James E. and Sons
- Architectural style: Colonial, Federal, et al.
- NRHP reference No.: 00000582
- Added to NRHP: June 2, 2000

Sagaponack Historic District is a national historic district located at Sagaponack in Suffolk County, New York. There are 131 contributing buildings, one contributing site, and three contributing structures. It includes residences, farm complexes, agricultural buildings, the Sagaponack School, and the General Store / Post Office. Dwellings reflect residential development from Sagaponack's early settlement in the 17th century, Federal and Greek Revival style residences of the early to mid-18th century, popular revival styles of the mid- to late-19th century, and early 20th century American Foursquare and Bungalow styles,

It was added to the National Register of Historic Places in 2000.

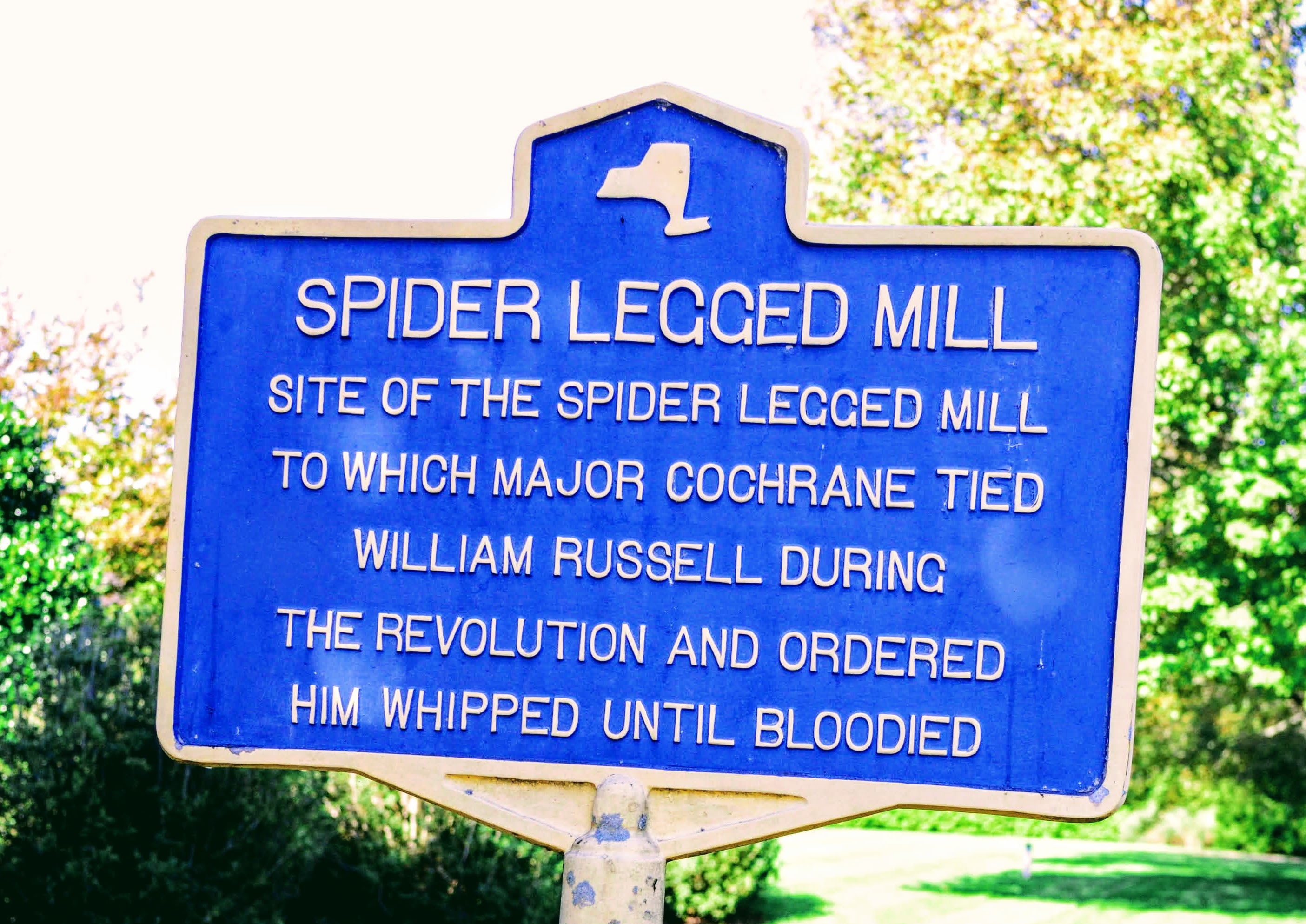
Spider legged mill historic marker

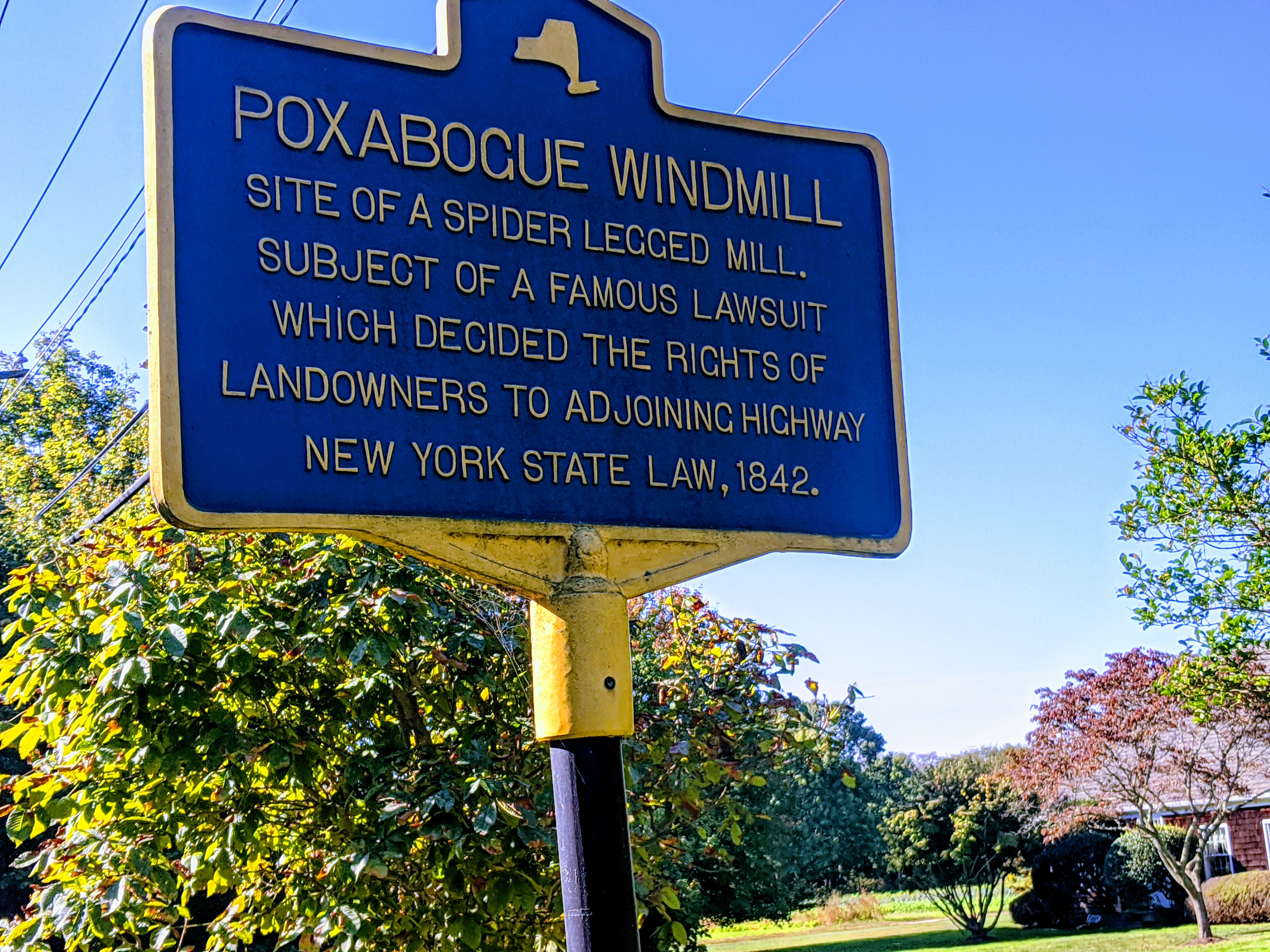
Poxabogue mill historic marker

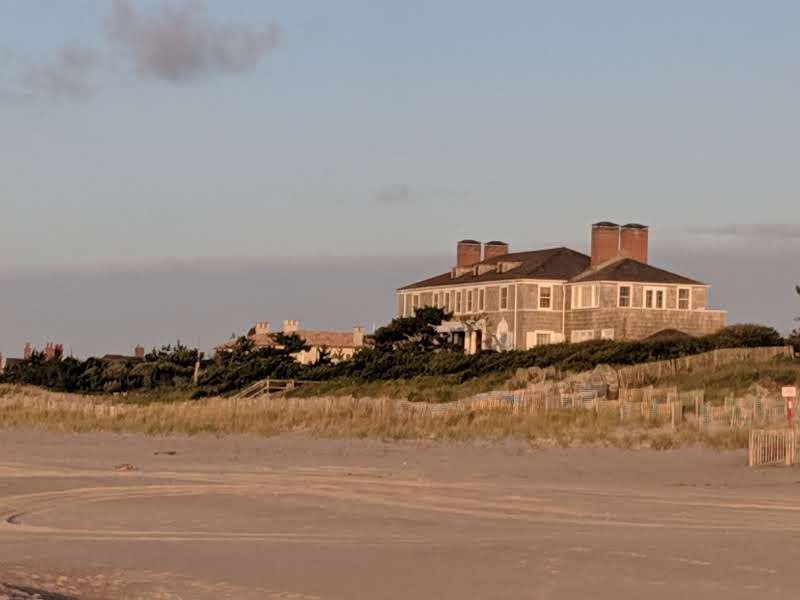
Wainscott 20190914
