= 2025 Nassau County Executive election =

- November 4, 2025
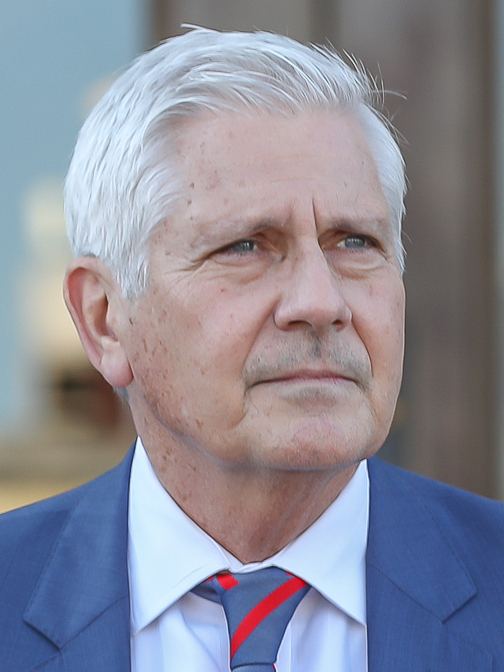

Nominee	Bruce Blakeman	Seth Koslow
Party	Republican	Democratic
Alliance	Conservative	Moderate
Popular vote	173,636	138,327
Percentage	55.61%	44.30%
- Blakeman: 50–60% 60–70% 70–80% 80–90% >90% Koslow: 50–60% 60–70% 70–80% 80–90% >90% Tie: 50% No data
County Executive before election
Bruce Blakeman
Republican
Elected County Executive
Bruce Blakeman
Republican

The 2025 Nassau County Executive election was held on November 4, 2025, to elect the County Executive of Nassau County, New York. Incumbent Republican County Executive Bruce Blakeman, first elected in 2021, was re-elected to a second term on the Republican and Conservative ballot lines against challenger Seth Koslow, a county legislator who ran on the Democratic and Moderate ballot lines.

== Republican Party ==
=== Nominee ===
- Bruce Blakeman, incumbent county executive

== Democratic Party ==
=== Nominee ===
- Seth Koslow, county legislator

== Third party candidates ==
=== Conservative Party ===
==== Nominee ====
- Bruce Blakeman, incumbent executive

=== Moderate Party ===
==== Nominee ====
- Seth Koslow, county legislator

== General election ==
=== Campaign ===
Koslow announced that he would challenge Blakeman on January 8, 2025, with endorsements from former County Executive Laura Curran, whom Blakeman defeated in 2021, and Congressman Tom Suozzi, who was County Executive from 2002 to 2009. Though Blakeman was at a financial disadvantage in his 2021 campaign, he outraised Koslow significantly in the first half of the year, raising $2 million to Koslow's $430,000 through July 15.

Despite President Donald Trump narrowly winning Nassau County in the 2024 presidential election, Koslow has attacked Blakeman over the effects of Trump's tariffs in the county, which Blakeman has defended, and over the effects of the Big Beautiful Bill on the county.

=== Endorsements ===
Bruce Blakeman (R)

Executive branch officials

- Donald Trump, president of the United States (2017–2021, 2025–present)

Local officials

- Mazi Melesa Pilip, county legislator from the 10th district (2022–present)

Labor unions

- Nassau County Correction Officers' Benevolent Association
- Nassau County Police Benevolent Association
- New York State Troopers Police Benevolent Association
- Nassau County Retired Police Association

Newspapers and other media

- 77 WABC
Seth Koslow (D)

State legislators

- Rory Lancman, former state assemblyman from the 25th district (2007–2012) and city councilor from the 24th district (2014–2020)

Party chapters

- Nassau County Democratic Party

Organizations

- Sierra Club
- Planned Parenthood Action
- New York League of Conservation Voters

Newspapers

- Newsday
Declined to endorse

Labor unions

- Communications Workers of America Local 1104

=== Results ===
2025 Nassau County Executive election
Party	Candidate	Votes	%
Republican	Bruce Blakeman	158,551	50.78%
Conservative	Bruce Blakeman	15,085	4.83%
Total	Bruce Blakeman (incumbent)	173,636	55.61%
Democratic	Seth Koslow	134,351	43.03%
Moderate	Seth Koslow	3,976	1.27%
Total	Seth Koslow	138,327	44.30%
Write-in		261	0.08%
Total votes		312,224	100.00%
Republican hold			

== See also ==
- 2025 Nassau County District Attorney election
- 2025 United States local elections
