= New York's 20th State Assembly district =

American legislative district

Assemblymember
Eric Brown; R–Cedarhurst

New York's 20th State Assembly district is one of the 150 districts in the New York State Assembly. It has been represented by Republican Eric Brown since 2022. He succeeded Melissa Miller, who was appointed to the Hempstead Town Board.

== Geography ==
=== 2020s ===
District 20 is located in Nassau County. It includes portions of the town of Hempstead, comprising most or all of the neighborhoods of North Woodmere, Inwood, Lawrence, Cedarhurst, Woodmere, Hewlett, Hewlett Bay Park, Hewlett Harbor, Hewlett Neck, Island Park, Long Beach, Lido Beach, Oceanside, and Atlantic Beach. It also contains portions of East Rockaway.

The district is entirely within New York's 4th congressional district, and overlaps the 6th and 9th districts of the New York State Senate.

=== 2010s ===
District 20 is located in Nassau County. It includes portions of the town of Hempstead, comprising the neighborhoods of North Woodmere, Inwood, Lawrence, Cedarhurst, Woodmere, Hewlett, Hewlett Bay Park, Hewlett Harbor, Hewlett Neck, Island Park, Long Beach, Lido Beach and Atlantic Beach. It also contains portions of East Rockaway and Oceanside.

== Recent election results ==
=== 2026 ===
2026 New York State Assembly election, District 20
Party	Candidate	Votes	%
Republican	Eric Brown		
Conservative	Eric Brown		
Total	Eric Brown (incumbent)		
Democratic	Meir Fischer		
Write-in			
Total votes			

=== 2024 ===
2024 New York State Assembly election, District 20
Party	Candidate	Votes	%
Republican	Eric Brown	37,134	
Conservative	Eric Brown	2,457	
Total	Eric Brown (incumbent)	39,591	62.6
Democratic	Tina Posterli	23,616	37.3
Write-in		57	0.1
Total votes		63,264	100.0
Republican hold			

=== 2022 ===
2022 New York State Assembly election, District 20
Party	Candidate	Votes	%
Republican	Eric Brown	27,775	
Conservative	Eric Brown	2,038	
Total	Eric Brown (incumbent)	29,813	61.1
Democratic	Michael Delury	18,983	38.9
Write-in		17	0.0
Total votes		48,813	100.0
Republican hold			

=== 2022 special ===
2022 New York State Assembly special election, District 20 (UNOFFICIAL)
Party	Candidate	Votes	%
Republican	Eric Brown	4,338	
Conservative	Eric Brown	673	
Total	Eric Brown	5,011	62.7
Democratic	David Lobl	2,954	37.0
Write-in		23	0.3
Total votes		7,997	100.0
Republican hold			

=== 2020 ===
2020 New York State Assembly election, District 20
Party	Candidate	Votes	%
Republican	Melissa Miller	34,862	
Conservative	Melissa Miller	2,576	
Independence	Melissa Miller	651	
Libertarian	Melissa Miller	229	
Total	Melissa Miller (incumbent)	38,318	59.0
Democratic	Gregory Marks	26,632	41.0
Write-in		23	0.0
Total votes		64,973	100.0
Republican hold			

=== 2018 ===
2018 New York State Assembly election, District 20
Primary election
Party	Candidate	Votes	%
Democratic	Juan Vides	3,657	51.8
Democratic	Jack Vobis	3,404	48.2
Write-in		0	0.0
Total votes		7,061	100
Reform	Jack Vobis	114	78.6
Reform	Melissa Miller (incumbent)	26	17.9
Reform	Juan Vides	5	3.5
Write-in		0	0.0
Total votes		145	100
General election
Republican	Melissa Miller	22,200	
Conservative	Melissa Miller	1,755	
Independence	Melissa Miller	500	
Total	Melissa Miller (incumbent)	24,455	53.1
Democratic	Juan Vides	21,111	45.8
Women's Equality	Jack Vobis	372	
Reform	Jack Vobis	136	
Total	Jack Vobis	508	1.1
Write-in		12	0.0
Total votes		46,086	100.0
Republican hold			

=== 2016 ===
2016 New York State Assembly election, District 20
Primary election
Party	Candidate	Votes	%
Democratic	Anthony Eramo	3,006	69.7
Democratic	Jeffrey Toback	1,305	30.3
Write-in		0	0.0
Total votes		4,311	100
General election
Republican	Melissa Miller	26,382	
Conservative	Melissa Miller	2,191	
Reform	Melissa Miller	238	
Tax Revolt Party	Melissa Miller	215	
Total	Melissa Miller	29,026	53.1
Democratic	Anthony Eramo	24,580	
Working Families	Anthony Eramo	814	
Independence	Anthony Eramo	459	
Women's Equality	Anthony Eramo	324	
Total	Anthony Eramo	26,177	46.7
Green	Joseph Naham	136	0.2
Write-in		18	0.0
Total votes		56,100	100.0
Republican gain from Democratic			

=== 2014 ===
2014 New York State Assembly election, District 20
Party	Candidate	Votes	%
Democratic	Todd Kaminsky	15,761	
Working Families	Todd Kaminsky	814	
Women's Equality	Todd Kaminsky	425	
Total	Todd Kaminsky	17,425	54.7
Republican	Avi Fertig	12,884	
Conservative	Avi Fertig	1,560	
Total	Avi Fertig	14,444	45.3
Write-in		10	0.0
Total votes		31,874	100.0
Democratic hold			

=== 2012 ===
2012 New York State Assembly election, District 20
Party	Candidate	Votes	%
Democratic	Harvey Weisenberg	20,223	
Working Families	Harvey Weisenberg	860	
Independence	Harvey Weisenberg	647	
Total	Harvey Weisenberg (incumbent)	21,730	56.0
Republican	David Sussman	12,884	
Conservative	David Sussman	1,560	
Tax Revolt Party	David Sussman	138	
Total	David Sussman	17,091	44.0
Write-in		9	0.0
Total votes		38,830	100.0
Democratic hold			

=== 2010 ===
2010 New York State Assembly election, District 20
Party	Candidate	Votes	%
Democratic	Harvey Weisenberg	18,085	
Independence	Harvey Weisenberg	1,122	
Working Families	Harvey Weisenberg	822	
Total	Harvey Weisenberg (incumbent)	20,029	52.8
Republican	Joshua Wanderer	16,195	
Conservative	Joshua Wanderer	1,560	
Total	Joshua Wanderer	17,902	47.2
Write-in		9	0.0
Total votes		37,940	100.0
Democratic hold			
