= Robert Barra =

American politician

Member of the New York State Assembly
- In office January 1, 2001 – December 31, 2010
- Preceded by: James Darcy
- Succeeded by: Brian Curran
- Constituency: 21st district (2001–2002); 14th district (2003–2010)

Personal details
- Born: 1959 or 1960 (age 65–66)
- Party: Republican
- Spouse: Celeste
- Children: 2
- Education: Hofstra University
- Profession: politician

Robert D. "Bob" Barra (born February 1, 1960) is a Republican who was elected to serve the 21st district of the New York State Assembly in November 2000. Because of redistricting due to the census, Assemblyman Barra became the Assembly member from the newly formed 14th Assembly district.

Barra received a B.A. degree in communication and journalism from Hofstra University in 1982. He has worked for the Nassau County Department of Commerce, the North Hempstead Town Board, the Nassau Board of Elections, former congressman David A. Levy, and the Nassau Republican Party. He was an aide to state senator Dean Skelos at three different times between 1996 and 1999.

From 1991 until 1997, Barra served on the Lynbrook Village Board of Trustees. In 1999 he was appointed to the Hempstead Town Board. He was unable to win re-election due to the change of how board members were elected; up until that point, Hempstead Town Board members were elected at-large, instead of using the district system that is in place today.

Barra became a member of the New York State Assembly in January 2001. He stepped down from the Assembly at the end of 2010.

He lives in Lynbrook, New York, with his wife Celeste and two daughters: Alexandra and Erica.

New York State Assembly
Preceded by James Darcy	New York State Assembly, 21st District; 2001–2002	Succeeded by Thomas Alfano
Preceded by Marc Herbst	New York State Assembly, 14th District; 2003–2010	Succeeded by Brian F. Curran
