= New York's 21st State Assembly district =

American legislative district

Assemblymember
Judy Griffin; D–Rockville Centre

New York's 21st State Assembly district is one of the 150 districts in the New York State Assembly. It has been represented by Judy Griffin since 2025, defeating Brian Curran. She previously represented the district between 2019 and 2022.

Historically, in 1881 the political operator Joseph Murray of the Republican organization in Manhattan helped to engineer the successful election of future President Theodore Roosevelt who began his political career representing the 21st district from 1882 to 1884, albeit under entirely different lines. The district was previously based in Manhattan; in Roosevelt's time it included the "Silk Stocking District" of the Upper East Side.

== Geography ==
=== 2020s ===
District 21 is located entirely within Nassau County. It is within the town of Hempstead, which includes the villages of Lynbrook, Rockville Centre, Malverne, South Hempstead, Baldwin and parts of Freeport, East Rockaway, and Valley Stream.

The district is entirely within New York's 4th congressional district, and overlaps the 6th and 9th districts of the New York State Senate.

=== 2010s ===
District 21 is located entirely within Nassau County. It includes the town of Hempstead, and contains the villages of Lynbrook, Rockville Centre, Malverne, South Hempstead, Baldwin and parts of Freeport, West Hempstead, Oceanside, East Rockaway, Lakeview, Hewlett, Hempstead, Franklin Square, and Valley Stream.

== Recent election results ==
=== 2026 ===
2026 New York State Assembly election, District 21
Party	Candidate	Votes	%
Democratic	Judy Griffin (incumbent)		
Republican	Irene Villacci		
Conservative	Irene Villacci		
Total	Irene Villacci		
Write-in			
Total votes			

=== 2024 ===
2024 New York State Assembly election, District 21
Primary election
Party	Candidate	Votes	%
Democratic	Judy Griffin	3,524	84.3
Democratic	Patricia Maher	648	15.5
Write-in		7	0.2
Total votes		4,179	100.0
General election
Democratic	Judy Griffin	36,031	51.8
Republican	Brian Curran	30,442	
Conservative	Brian Curran	2,978	
Total	Brian Curran (incumbent)	33,420	48.1
Write-in		75	0.1
Total votes		69,526	100.0
Democratic gain from Republican			

=== 2022 ===
2022 New York State Assembly election, District 21
Party	Candidate	Votes	%
Republican	Brian Curran	23,407	
Conservative	Brian Curran	2,432	
Total	Brian Curran	25,839	50.1
Democratic	Judy Griffin (incumbent)	25,701	49.9
Write-in		9	0.0
Total votes		51,549	100.0
Republican gain from Democratic			

=== 2020 ===
2020 New York State Assembly election, District 21
Party	Candidate	Votes	%
Democratic	Judy Griffin (incumbent)	36,373	53.1
Republican	Patricia Canzoneri-Fitzpatrick	28,583	
Conservative	Patricia Canzoneri-Fitzpatrick	3,073	
Total	Patricia Canzoneri-Fitzpatrick	31,656	46.2
Libertarian	Barry Leon	487	0.7
Write-in		28	0.0
Total votes		68,544	100.0
Democratic hold			

=== 2018 ===
2018 New York State Assembly election, District 21
Primary election
Party	Candidate	Votes	%
Reform	Judy Griffin	217	67.0
Reform	Brian Curran (incumbent)	103	31.8
Write-in		4	1.2
Total votes		324	100
General election
Democratic	Judy Griffin	26,516	
Working Families	Judy Griffin	500	
Women's Equality	Judy Griffin	360	
Reform	Judy Griffin	56	
Total	Judy Griffin	27,432	53.0
Republican	Brian Curran	21,111	
Conservative	Brian Curran	372	
Independence	Brian Curran	136	
Total	Brian Curran (incumbent)	24,236	46.9
Write-in		55	0.1
Total votes		51,723	100.0
Democratic gain from Republican			

=== 2016 ===
2016 New York State Assembly election, District 21
Party	Candidate	Votes	%
Republican	Brian Curran	29,674	
Conservative	Brian Curran	3,273	
Independence	Brian Curran	1,067	
Reform	Brian Curran	191	
Total	Brian Curran (incumbent)	34,205	57.4
Democratic	Travis Bourgeois	25,402	42.6
Write-in		23	0.0
Total votes		59,632	100.0
Republican hold			

=== 2014 ===
2014 New York State Assembly election, District 21
Party	Candidate	Votes	%
Republican	Brian Curran	16,887	
Conservative	Brian Curran	2,522	
Independence	Brian Curran	914	
Tax Revolt Party	Brian Curran	140	
Total	Brian Curran (incumbent)	20,463	63.2
Democratic	Adam Shapiro	11,935	36.8
Write-in		10	0.0
Total votes		32,408	100.0
Republican hold			

=== 2012 ===
2012 New York State Assembly election, District 21
Party	Candidate	Votes	%
Republican	Brian Curran	23,376	
Conservative	Brian Curran	2,991	
Independence	Brian Curran	1,022	
Tax Revolt Party	Brian Curran	238	
Total	Brian Curran (incumbent)	27,627	53.7
Democratic	Jeffrey Friedman	22,593	
Working Families	Jeffrey Friedman	1,252	
Total	Jeffrey Friedman	23,845	46.3
Write-in		14	0.0
Total votes		51,486	100.0
Republican hold			
