= Carol Berman =

American politician (1923–2023)

Member of the New York Senate from the 9th district
- In office 1979–1984
- Preceded by: Karen Burstein
- Succeeded by: Dean G. Skelos

Personal details
- Born: September 21, 1923
- Died: October 17, 2023 (aged 100)
- Party: Democratic Party

Carol Berman (September 21, 1923 – October 17, 2023) was an American Democratic Party politician in New York, from Lawrence, in Nassau County. She served in the New York State Senate from 1979 to 1984. Berman first achieved attention for her efforts to prevent the landing of Concorde and other supersonic transports at nearby John F. Kennedy International Airport.

Berman was part of the leadership of the Emergency Coalition to Stop the SST, which sought to stop Concorde from using Kennedy Airport, whose runway approaches passed over her Lawrence home. Protesters led by Berman and other groups opposed to Concorde ran a series of protests at Kennedy Airport starting in May 1977 in which as many as 1,000 cars drove along the main airport roadway at the 6:00 p.m. peak, driving at 5 to 10 miles per hour. Berman announced in August 1978 that her group was seeking to raise $100,000 to be used to help fund a lawsuit against the Port Authority of New York and New Jersey and encouraged other area residents to sue the Port Authority.

Berman was a district aide in the offices of Assemblyman Eli Wager and of Representative Herbert Tenzer. She was vice chairman of the Nassau County Democratic Committee and was a delegate for Henry M. "Scoop" Jackson at the 1976 Democratic National Convention in New York City. She died on October 17, 2023, at the age of 100.

== Election history ==
Berman was a member of the New York State Senate from 1979 to 1984, sitting in the 183rd, 184th, and 185th New York State Legislatures. She was first elected in November 1978 in the 9th District which included portions of southwestern Nassau County, including the Atlantic Ocean communities of Point Lookout and Long Beach, along with the Five Towns, and then crossed over into southeastern Queens, including Rosedale, Springfield Gardens, and South Jamaica, all of which encircle Kennedy Airport. The district was split evenly between Queens and Nassau, contained roughly equal numbers of African American and White voters, and had a strong Democratic majority. The New York Times opined in 1979 that "Berman could make a lifetime career in the Senate seat since the district is predominantly Democratic with a large Jewish population in Nassau and a large black population in the Queens portion." In the Senate she served on the Corporation and Authorities Committee, the Transportation Committee, and was the ranking minority member on the Commerce and Economic Development Committee.

In 1982, one-term Republican Assemblyman Dean Skelos gave up his seat to challenge Berman. The re-apportionment following the 1980 United States census changed the boundaries of the 9th Senate District, which previously included parts of Queens County. The new district, drawn by Senate Republicans, was now entirely within Nassau County and favored Republicans, after the Queens portion of the district had been removed to satisfy the objective of Federal judges to create a district in southeastern Queens that would elect an African American to the Senate. Skelos was endorsed by the Republican and Conservative parties. Berman, running on the Democratic and Liberal party lines won the race by 6,108 votes (55,504 to 49,396). Matthew Doyle, the Right-to-Life party candidate, received 2,520 votes in the three-way race. Berman's victory over the well-financed Skelos made her the only Democrat elected to fill one of the eight State Senate seats in Nassau and Suffolk counties. Berman filed a $6 million suit against Skelos in Nassau Supreme Court, citing campaign literature that she claimed mischaracterized her positions on the use of plain language in insurance policies and on busing children across county lines.

In 1984 Skelos challenged Berman in a rematch. This time, Skelos, who had President Ronald Reagan visit the district and campaign for him, defeated Berman in a two-way race. Berman challenged Skelos in their third consecutive state senate contest in 1986. Skelos, running on the Republican and Conservative party lines, defeated the Democratic-Liberal candidate Berman in a three-way race.

== Long Island Rail Road gap accident ==
In September 2006 Berman made news when she broke her ankle during a fall into a 10-inch-wide (250 mm) gap between a Long Island Rail Road train and the platform at the LIRR's Lawrence station. The following month, after reading about a Minnesota teenager killed in an August 2006 gap fall and a former Rockette paralyzed in a 2004 fall, she filed a $1 million claim against the Long Island Rail Road and the Metropolitan Transportation Authority. The lawsuit was settled in January 2009 for $150,000.

New York State Senate
Preceded by Karen Burstein	New York State Senate; 9th District; 1979–1984	Succeeded by Dean Skelos
