= 2025 Nassau County District Attorney election =

- November 4, 2025

Candidate	Anne Donnelly	Nicole Aloise
Party	Republican	Democratic
Alliance	Conservative	Moderate
Popular vote	171,443	138,576
Percentage	55.28%	44.68%
District Attorney before election
Anne Donnelly
Republican
Elected District Attorney
Anne Donnelly
Republican

The 2025 Nassau County District Attorney election was held on November 4, 2025, to elect the District Attorney of Nassau County, New York. Incumbent Republican Anne Donnelly was re-elected.

== Republican primary ==
=== Candidates ===
==== Nominee ====
- Anne Donnelly, incumbent district attorney

== Democratic primary ==
=== Candidates ===
==== Nominee ====
- Nicole Aloise, prosecutor

== General election ==
=== Campaign ===
Donnelly has stated that Aloise lacks the necessary management experience for the job, even though 90 prosecutors have left during her administration. Republicans in the county have sent out mailers likening Aloise to Zohran Mamdani, the Democratic nominee in the 2025 New York City mayoral election, even though Aloise has denounced Mamdani. Aloise has stated that she will be tough on crime, and has focused on Donnelly's leadership style.

In August, Aloise had outraised Donnelly by over $80,000. Aloise had raised $254,000, while Donnelly raised just $165,000.

=== Endorsements ===
Anne Donnelly (R)

Executive branch officials

- Donald Trump

Labor unions

- AFL-CIO Long Island
- Nassau County Correction Officers' Benevolent Association
- Nassau County Retired Police Association
- Nassau County Superior Officers Association

Newspapers and other media

- 77 WABC
Nicole Aloise (D)

Labor unions

- 1199SEIU United Healthcare Workers East
- Civil Service Employees Association Local 830
- Communications Workers of America Local 1104
- Police Benevolent Association of the New York State Troopers

Organizations

- Moms Demand Action (Everytown for Gun Safety)

Newspapers

- Newsday
Declined to endorse

Labor unions

- Nassau County Detectives Association

=== Results ===
2025 Nassau County District Attorney election
Party	Candidate	Votes	%
Republican	Anne Donnelly	155,572	50.16
Conservative	Anne Donnelly	15,871	5.12
Total	Anne Donnelly (incumbent)	171,443	55.28
Democratic	Nicole Aloise	134,230	43.28
Moderate	Nicole Aloise	4,346	1.40
Total	Nicole Aloise	138,576	44.68
Write-in		144	0.05
Total votes		310,163	100.00%

== See also ==
- 2025 Nassau County Executive election
- 2025 United States local elections
