= Judy Griffin =

American politician

Member of the New York State Assembly from the 21st district
- Incumbent
- Assumed office January 1, 2025
- Preceded by: Brian F. Curran
- In office January 1, 2019 – December 31, 2022
- Preceded by: Brian F. Curran
- Succeeded by: Brian F. Curran

Personal details
- Party: Democratic
- Education: SUNY Oneonta (BA)
- Website: Official website

Judy Griffin is an American politician and author who represents the 21st district in the New York State Assembly. The district is located in Nassau County on Long Island. A Democrat, Griffin was first elected to the Assembly in 2018, was re-elected in 2020, was unseated in 2022, and won her seat back in 2024.

== Education and career ==
Griffin holds a Bachelor of Science in Business Economics with minors in Political Science and Communication from the State University of New York at Oneonta. An integrative health coach, Griffin founded a health coaching business and co-founded a corporate wellness business. In 2014, she published a book entitled Flourish Beyond 50: Your Path to Vibrant Living. Griffin also served as Director of Community Outreach for state Senator Todd Kaminsky.

In 2018, Griffin ran for New York State Assembly in District 21 against incumbent Republican Brian F. Curran of Lynbrook, New York, who had held the seat since 2010. In the 2018 New York state elections, Griffin unseated Curran. In the 2020 New York State Assembly elections, Griffin sought re-election and defeated Republican Patricia Canzoneri-Fitzpatrick. In the 2022 New York State Assembly elections, Griffin narrowly lost her seat to Curran in a rematch by a margin of 138 votes (50.1% to 49.9%). Griffin ran for the Assembly again in 2024, winning the Democratic primary by a wide margin and unseating Curran in the general election.

In the Assembly, Griffin has supported reproductive rights, the Red Flag Gun Law, and New York's Equal Rights Amendment.

== Personal life ==
Griffin and her husband, Mike, have resided in Rockville Centre, New York for over 30 years. The Griffins have four children.
