= Ed Mangano =

American politician

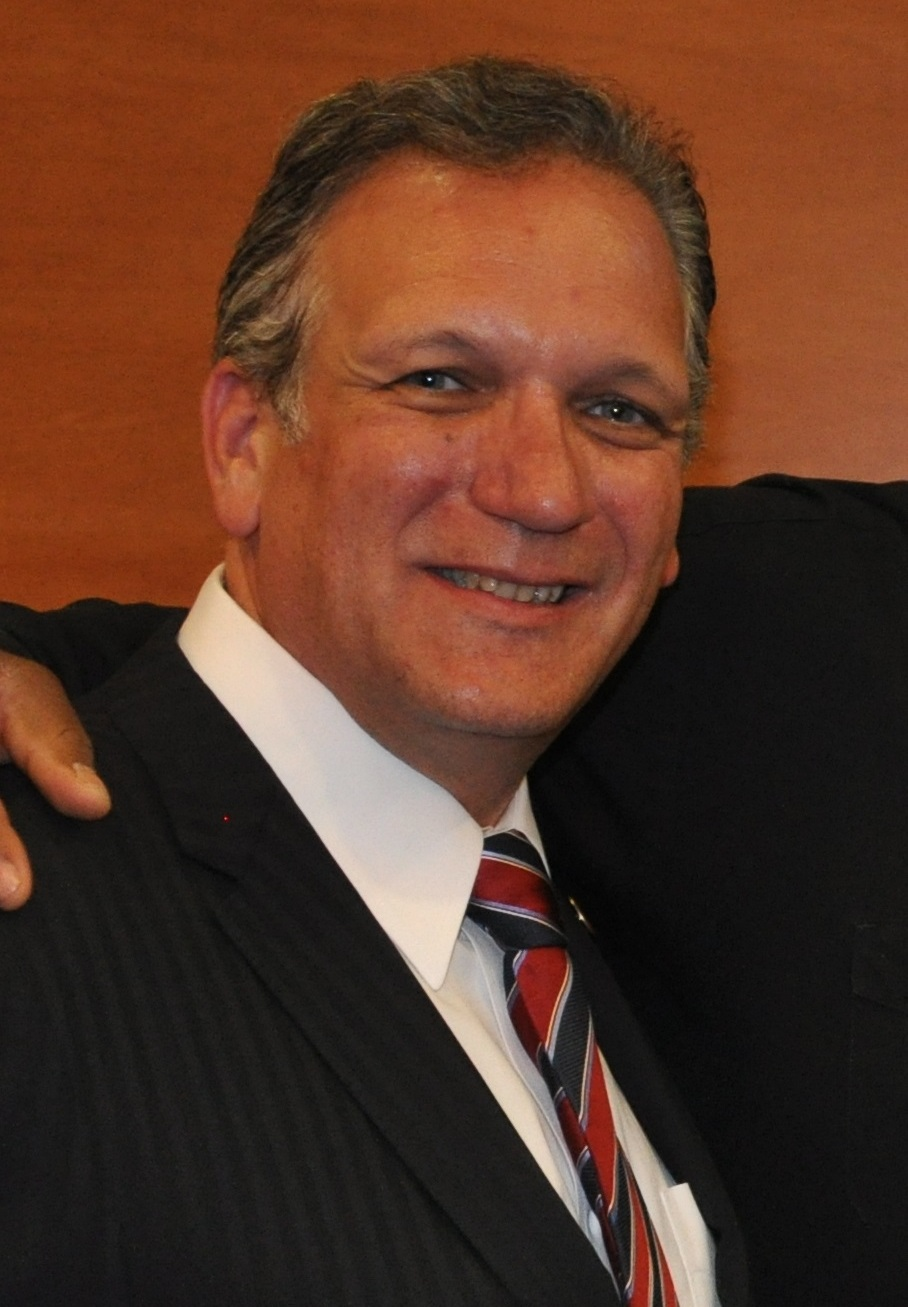
- Mangano in 2013

8th County Executive of Nassau County
- In office January 1, 2010 – December 30, 2017
- Preceded by: Tom Suozzi
- Succeeded by: Laura Curran

Member of the Nassau County Legislature from the 17th district
- In office January 1, 1996 – December 31, 2009
- Preceded by: Position established
- Succeeded by: Rose Marie Walker

Personal details
- Born: Edward P. Mangano; March 24, 1962 (age 64) Bethpage, New York, U.S.
- Party: Republican
- Spouse: Linda Mangano
- Children: 2
- Education: Hofstra University
- Criminal information
- Status: Incarcerated at Federal Medical Center, Devens. Due to be released on May 7, 2032.
- Convictions: fraud; bribery
- Penalty: 12 years imprisonment

Edward P. Mangano (born March 24, 1962) is an American former politician and disbarred attorney from the state of New York. A Republican, he was the Nassau County Executive from January 2010 to December 2017, and a former legislator in Nassau County, New York. He was elected in 1995 and served seven terms as a county legislator. In November 2009, he defeated incumbent Thomas R. Suozzi for Nassau County Executive. In November 2013, he was re-elected, again defeating Suozzi, by 59% to 41%.

In October 2016, a 13-count federal indictment for fraud and bribery was unsealed in the U.S. District Court for the Eastern District of New York against Mangano, his wife Linda, and Oyster Bay Town Supervisor John Venditto. He did not seek reelection in 2017. He and his wife were both convicted in March 2019 and faced up to 20 years in prison. In April 2022, Mangano was sentenced to 12 years in prison for felonies and has since reported to prison on September 13, 2022 pending appeal.

== Early life ==
Edward Mangano was raised in Bethpage, New York, one of three siblings born to John and Rachel Mangano. During high school he worked as a janitor, in order to earn money for college. He earned undergraduate and law degrees from Hofstra University.

== Early career ==
Mangano printed and published newspapers. In 1988, he was admitted to the New York State Bar. He subsequently served as counsel to the Long Island law firm Rivkin Radler.

== County legislator ==
Mangano represented the 17th legislative district of Nassau County as County Legislator for seven terms, from 1996, when the legislature was first formed, until 2009. This district includes areas of Bethpage, Hicksville, Plainedge, South Farmingdale, Levittown and Syosset. He served on the Rules Committee, the Public Works Committee, the Recreation and Parks Committee, the Procedures Committee, and the Economic and Community Development Committee. He was replaced by fellow Republican Rose Marie Walker.

Mangano was the recipient of an award from New York's League of Conservation Voters for "working to preserve open space and setting aside $5 million for the acquisition of the (81 acre) Underhill Property" and for "fighting for the “Clean Water/Clear Air bond act funding for the purpose of ground water protection".

=== 2009 County Executive campaign ===
In the spring of 2009, Legislator Mangano began a campaign for Nassau County Executive. His platform included promises to cut wasteful spending, freeze and fix Nassau's broken property tax assessment system, repeal the new tax on home energy and electricity use, and halt the practice of borrowing and relying on debt to pay current expenses.

In an upset in the November 2009 election, Mangano narrowly defeated the incumbent, Thomas Suozzi, winning the county executive position by 386 votes. He led the Republicans to a major victory, in which they took three of the four county-wide positions, and regained control of the County Legislature.

In October 2009, Mangano's brother's business, New Media Printing, in Bethpage was found to have more than $900,000 in federal and state tax liens. Mangano stated that he no longer had an interest in this company.

== County executive ==
=== Tax policy ===
Mangano promised that if elected, he would repeal a $38 million home energy tax on homeowners passed by former County Executive Tom Suozzi, which cost households on average $7.27 a month. During his inaugural address, Mangano fulfilled his promise by signing an executive order to repeal the tax as of June 1, 2010. His administration estimated the repeal would save families and seniors hundreds of dollars each year. He eliminated a 13% property tax hike proposed by Suozzi.

Due to the lost revenue from the tax cut, the Nassau County Interim Financial Authority (NIFA) found that the county's $2.6 billion budget was out of balance by $176 million. This led Moody's Investors Service to downgrade the county and put its finances on outlook negative. NIFA did not consider Mangano to have a satisfactory plan to make up for the lost revenue, and seized control of the county's finances. This outcome was called "a cautionary tale" and "a black eye for the Tea Party" by Reuters, although it was noted that much of the county's financial problems had been inherited from a previous financial crisis in 1999 under the administration of then-County Executive Thomas Gulotta which had led to the original creation of NIFA.

In his proposed 2011 budget, Mangano proposed the removal of the county guarantee, a policy that saw Nassau County repaying taxes that were wrongfully collected and distributed to school taxes. Under the new policy school districts in Nassau, like the rest of the country, would be responsible for returning funds collected in error. This was met with heated opposition by the school districts, who objected that they would immediately be forced to begin setting money aside to pay the property tax refunds starting in 2013. The budget was approved by the Nassau County Legislature on October 30, 2010, with all 8 Democrats voting against and all 11 Republicans voting in favor.

Mangano has implemented several tax initiatives including "$35.6 million in revenue" garnered "from increased real estate fees that" have added "hundreds or thousands of dollars to the cost of buying, selling or refinancing properties in the county." A CBS news story about the proposed inclusion of a $105 surcharge for every issuance of a traffic or parking ticket in Nassau County quoted several county residents deriding potential fallout from such fees; in the same story, Mangano said "the fee would help pay for the police force to work overtime in policing public events, and would alleviate homeowners from potential tax increases". On October 5, 2016, Nassau County legislature Democrats opposed Mangano's tax plan, claiming it was a 9.4% tax increase.

==== Assessment system ====
The property assessment system in Nassau County had been blamed for costing taxpayers $250 million each year, including $100 million in refunds and $150 million in interest on debt incurred to pay tax settlements in previous years. In all, this accounts for $1.13 billion of the county's $2.45 billion in outstanding debt. Mangano in March 2010 said he would make reforming the assessment system a priority in his administration, and instructed county lawyers to insist on a 3% rather than 4% interest rate for commercial tax certiorari settlements, saving the county $1 million annually, and created an Assessment Reform Team to study the property tax assessment system and make recommendations for fixing it. He also moved the county to a four-year assessment cycle so that the assessed property values would be more stable. In May 2010, Mangano returned to financing property tax refunds with new debt rather than out of its regular budget in what was described as a temporary measure, a move which was criticized by Democrats because it went against NIFA's wishes to end such borrowing completely.

In late October 2010, errors were found in the first school tax-roll released by the Mangano administration, including incorrect tax-exempt statuses for various properties, such Nassau's own Executive Building, which was included on the roll at $56 million despite being tax-exempt, which contributed to assessing the county itself with an erroneous $1.3 million school tax bill. Following these errors, Mangano fired Assessor Ted Jankowski, who had been originally appointed by Thomas Suozzi and had been criticized by Republicans, and who was considered to be at fault for the errors not being caught. To fix the assessment system further, former Smithtown Assessor Gregory Hild was appointed to review the system.

==== Property tax ====
During Andrew Cuomo's Governor campaign, Mangano supported Cuomo's 2% Tax Cap plan which forces all property tax increases to be capped at the lower of 2% or the rate of inflation, and appeared at many Long Island rallies with him. In June 2011, after passing the State Legislature, Cuomo signed the Tax Cap plan in Lynbrook, along with Mangano and other County politicians.

==== Lawsuit against MTA ====
In July 2010, Mangano announced that Nassau County had filed a lawsuit against the State of New York and the Metropolitan Transportation Authority (MTA) challenging the legality of the 0.34% Metropolitan Commuter Transportation Mobility Tax, a payroll tax levied on employers in the 12-county area served by the MTA. Mangano said that the lawsuit was a reaction to the MTA's plans to significantly reducing funding to the Long Island Bus and asserted that it "costs Nassau government about $3 million a year and county business owners another $100 million." The lawsuit challenged the legality and constitutionality of the MTA Employer Payroll Tax and argued that it violated the New York State Constitution. Several municipalities joined Nassau's lawsuit, including Orange, Putnam, Rockland, Westchester, and Suffolk counties.

Although the counties' suit was initially successful in the trial court, the counties lost on appeal.

=== Budgetary policy ===
Mangano delivered his first "State of the County" address on March 15, 2010. During the speech Mangano stated that, to solve Nassau County's woes, structural reforms would be needed to fix the property tax assessment system and rein in county spending.

Mangano has reduced the public payroll, including highly paid managers, by $22 million in 2010. He also launched an effort to sell surplus property such as vehicles and equipment in an effort to reduce maintenance costs.

In 2011, Mangano faced a $310 million Nassau County deficit. In September 2011, Mangano released a proposed 2012 budget with a total cut of $62 million and planned layoffs of 1,010 out of 8,000 total employees (including those 300 already made prior to September 2011), with 5-15% cuts in every department, including the consolidation of police precincts (described below) and the closing of several museums. The budget would also require all employees to contribute 25% toward their health insurances. This budget was criticized by some legislators and police union representatives. This budget was approved in October 2011, by a party-line vote of 11 Republicans in favor and 8 Democrats opposed.

In September 2011, Mangano proposed selling the Nassau County sewer system to a private operator in a private-public partnership for $1.3 billion. The county has hired Morgan Stanley as an advisor concerning this sale. Nassau's current Sewer and Storm Water Finance Authority has $162 million of its own debt, and is responsible for $305 million of sewer debt issued by the county before 2004.

In January 2012, Mangano and other Nassau County officials announced a plan to consolidate Nassau County's eight police precincts into 4 precincts and to eliminate 108 mostly administrative jobs (95 officers and 13 civilian positions), which they claim could save $20 million a year. Mangano and county officials said that the number of police cars will remain the same at 177, but prisoners would be processed exclusively at the four remaining precincts, which are called community policing centers under the plan. The Nassau Police Benevolent Association and four other Nassau police unions were sharply critical of this plan and of earlier concessions that Mangano had called for, but a Newsday editorial supported it.

=== Economic development ===
In March 2010, Mangano reached an agreement with Democrats to amend the county's $166 million Capital Improvement Plan to align it with his priorities for the county.

Due to the collapse of Charles Wang and Scott Rechler's Lighthouse project, County Executive Mangano partnered with Wang in early 2012 to rebuild the Nassau Veterans Memorial Coliseum, as well as add an Atlantic League Minor League ballpark and an indoor track and convention facility. Mangano cited the redevelopment as a major economic and business development boost for Nassau County, as well as a job generator. The proposition had support from numerous Long Island institutions, including The Long Island Association, Nassau Chambers of Commerce, the Nassau County Independence Party, and the National Hockey League. Nassau County held a special election in August 2011 to ask people to vote on whether they would agree to increased taxes amounting to $13.80 per household to pay for a bond to redevelop the area. The New York Daily News criticized this bond as a public subsidy for a risky private venture based on very optimistic projected attendance rates. Nassau voters rejected the proposed Coliseum redevelopment.

After the special election, Mangano announced Request for Proposals (RFPs) for private companies to redevelop the 77 acres of Coliseum site. The request stated that all proposals must address job creation, quality of life and revenue. In October 2011, the County submitted a plan to the Empire State Development Corp. detailing the creation of a new Nassau Coliseum as well as a bio-research facility at the Coliseum site. The county is looking for state funding for the plan, as well as for the development of a casino and soccer stadium at Belmont Park and an expansion of film studios and homeland security facilities at the Grumman property in Bethpage. The plan also mentions a minor league ballpark and track facility in Mitchel Field.

Mangano put together the annual Cruise To The Show car show and parade in 2011, featuring concerts, fundraisers, and a parade of classic cars, as well as awards. Mangano, who is a classic car enthusiast, was joined by Governor Andrew Cuomo, and his vintage corvette at the 2011 show. The governor and Mangano want to make Cruise To The Show a huge East Coast car event in Eisenhower Park, and Mangano stated his belief that it would increase tourism. Nassau County Legislator Kevan Abrahams criticized the show as a frivolous expense during a time of County budget cuts, claiming it would cost $75,000 in police overtime and noting that it was funded by a hotel/museum tax, which Abrahams said would have been better spent on museums.

=== Issues with Long Island Bus ===
The operation of MTA Long Island Bus, the public bus transportation system for Nassau County, was subject to a funding dispute between its operator, the Metropolitan Transportation Authority (MTA), and the county. For the past decade, the MTA had provided a unique subsidy to the Nassau County bus system, amounting to $24 million in 2011 and over $140 million since 2000, that the other New York City suburban county bus systems had not received at all. The MTA asked for an additional $17 million contribution from the county: the county's contribution had been $9.1 million per year out of a total budget of $133.1 million, and the MTA desired that this contribution increase to $26 million. By comparison, Westchester County had subsidized its similarly sized Bee-Line Bus System by $33 million per year, and that Suffolk subsidizes its substantially smaller Suffolk County Transit system by $24 million per year.

The County refused to increase their contribution, accusing the MTA of waste and inefficiency, and on September 7, 2010 Mangano called for the immediate resignation of MTA Chairman and CEO Jay Walder while also asking the state's Gubernatorial candidates to make a simple promise to voters to shake up leadership at the Authority. The county began to consider terminating their operation agreement with the MTA and privatizing the bus system. In response to the lack of a funding agreement, the MTA considered eliminating half of Long Island Bus' routes in July 2011, and potentially eliminating the entire system by the end of 2011. The MTA had previously slashed its Able-Ride service, which was the primary mode of transportation for many people with disabilities, and increased bus and subway fares in an effort to increase their revenue by 7.5% to close a $900-million deficit for that year.

The county hoped to reduce its annual contribution from $9.1 million to $4.1 million by using a private contractor rather than the MTA to operate the bus system. The planned county contribution was later decreased to $2.5 million per year. On July 22, 2010, Mangano announced he would immediately form a committee that would explore privatizing the bus service. On September 24, 2010 he issued a Request for Proposals (RFP) to privatize Nassau's public bus service. A partial compromise was reached on April 1, 2011 as the New York State Legislature moved to provide an extra $8.6 million to avoid the July service cuts, which would have eliminated half of Long Island Bus' lines. This compromise saw Nassau County pay half the increase that the MTA had sought. No provision was made for future years, though, and later in April the MTA Board voted to terminate the Long Island Bus contract at the end of the year.

On June 10, 2011, the RFP committee chose Veolia Transport as the operator. This privatization plan was the subject of heated county public hearings in which Long Island Bus riders and employees criticized the plan. In November 2011, Veolia and the county announced a new name for Long Island Bus, NICE (Nassau Inter-County Express). Mangano also announced that a five-person transportation committee will be formed, consisting of all Nassau residents, to oversee Nassau's bus future. Fare changes require a committee vote. Prior to this, as County Executive, Mangano had stated that all routes and fares will not change for a minimum of a year, and that Veolia will be re-instituting the lines the MTA wanted to cut. He has also stated that this private-public partnership will save taxpayers $32.4 million annually.

On December 12, the full Legislature voted on the bus service, and unanimously voted to approve Veolia as the provider for County bus service. Veolia took over operations on January 1, 2012.

Service cuts were announced by Veolia in February 2012, involving no route cancellations but including $7.2 million in cuts to existing routes, which was significantly smaller than the $26 million in cuts that the MTA had proposed the prior year. These cuts would take effect in April 2012. These planned cuts were criticized as occurring too soon, only six weeks after starting service. These consisted of service reductions and route concentrations planned for routes primarily serving northern and eastern Nassau County, with resources redirected towards busier routes. These cuts ultimately included decreased service on 30 routes, including elimination of weekend service and decreased midday service on seven routes. The Long Island Bus Rider's Union, a transit advocacy group, sharply criticized the cuts, claiming that "the announcements of service adjustments on the NICE bus website were very unclear", that service to many health care and social service centers was cut, and that "many of the NICE bus service cuts appear to be in low income communities where more people rely on buses to get to work and to access the few available health care centers that serve their needs."

In March 2014, the NICE bus system faced another $3.3 million budget deficit. At that time, the bus system expected "an increase of state aid – its largest revenue stream – of $1.2 million." NICE chief executive Michael Setzer said that NICE would "take a fresh look" at "underperforming" lines. Bus advocates pressed the County Legislature to increase funding for NICE, noting that neighboring counties contribute significantly more to their bus systems, such as Suffolk County subsidizing Suffolk County Transit with about $29 million in county tax dollars, compared to only $2.6 million from Nassau County to NICE.

On October 31, 2014, the Nassau County legislature adopted a 2015 budget that will increase Nassau County's contribution to NICE bus from $2.6 million to $4.6 million in 2015 and promised not to raise fares outside of MetroCard fare increases (MetroCard is controlled by the Metropolitan Transportation Authority).

However, on December 11, 2014, Mangano proposed cutting $4 million from Nassau County's NICE bus contribution (in addition to cuts to numerous other Nassau County services) to replace the $30 million that will be lost after the shutdown of Nassau County's controversial school speed zone cameras.

=== Bribery charges ===
On October 20, 2016, Mangano and his wife were arrested on corruption charges related to a bribery and kickback scheme, and charged in the U.S. District Court for the Eastern District of New York by assistant United States attorneys Lara Gatz, Catherine Mirabile and Christopher Caffarone. The charges allege that Mangano helped restaurant magnate Harendra Singh with business deals and lucrative contracts with Nassau County, including a "six-figure contract to supply the Nassau County jail with bread and rolls", in exchange for free vacations, home improvements, a no-show job for Linda Mangano as a food taster at one of Singh's restaurants (Water's Edge), and other perks. Also, Singh sought Mangano's help in obtaining a loan guarantee from Oyster Bay Town Supervisor John Venditto (who was also charged) to operate a restaurant at that town's beach.

In October 2016, Singh pleaded guilty "to bribing Edward Mangano and Venditto with benefits ranging from free meals at his restaurants to a no-show job for Linda Mangano that totaled $450,000 in pay." The Manganos and Venditto pleaded not guilty. The first trial, which began in March 2018, took place in Central Islip before U.S. District Judge Joan Azrack. Singh testified for the prosecution.

On May 31, 2018 Azrack declared a mistrial in the case against Mangano. In the retrial, opening statements began on January 25, 2019. Mangano and his wife were convicted of multiple counts of corruption in March 2019. Mangano was also disbarred October 8, 2019. In January 2021, a federal judge delayed a hearing into whether the convictions should be overturned due to a defense claim that a key government witness in the trial committed perjury.

On April 14, 2022, Mangano was sentenced to 12 years in prison, while his wife was sentenced to 15 months. On September 13, 2022, as part of his appeal, his bail motion was denied by the US Court of Appeals, thus Mangano has reported to prison at the Federal Medical Center located in Devens Massachusetts Pending appeal, Mangano will serve 12 years and has been ordered to pay $10 million in restitution.

== Tax Revolt Party ==
Tax Revolt Party
- Chairperson: Ed Mangano (chair)
- Founded: 2009
- Dissolved: 2017
- Headquarters: Bethpage, NY
- Ideology: American conservatism
- Political position: Right-wing
- International affiliation: None
- Colors: Purple and Green

The Tax Revolt Party (TR) was a minor political party in the United States founded in Nassau County, New York in 2009. It was unrelated to the similarly named Taxpayers Party of New York founded by Carl Paladino in 2010.

In 2017, the Tax Revolt Party was effectively abandoned after its founder, Ed Mangano, chose not to seek re-election. Representative Peter T. King filed for use of the Tax Revolt line in the 2018 election, the only candidate of any office to do so.

=== Background ===
Nassau County's Tax Revolt Party provided a second ballot line to Republican candidate Ed Mangano during his 2009 run for Nassau County Executive. Mangano had only the Republican line while the Democratic, Independence, and Working Families lines went to County Executive Tom Suozzi and the Conservative Party line went to Robert Bruno.

=== Strategy ===
The Tax Revolt Party benefits from New York's electoral fusion laws that permit a single candidate to receive endorsements from multiple parties. The Tax Revolt Party only endorses Republican Party candidates. In statewide races, the TRP only endorses people from Nassau County.

=== 2009 candidates ===
In Nassau County the Tax Revolt Party cross-endorsed Republican Party County Executive candidate Ed Mangano. The Tax Revolt Party only supported other Republican Party candidates for county legislator, including Christian Browne, Howard Kopel, Rose Walker, and Joe Belisi. All of the Tax Revolt Party's petitions, other than Mangano's, were invalidated or withdrawn.

=== 2010 candidates ===
The party made another round of endorsements in 2010. It did not endorse a gubernatorial candidate, which barred the party from becoming one of the qualified New York parties. Bruce Blakeman was the party's nominee for the U.S. Senate seat held by Kirsten Gillibrand. It also made endorsements in three congressional races: Peter T. King in the 3rd district, Francis Becker in the 4th, and Elizabeth Berney in the 5th.

For the New York State Senate, the party endorsed Carl Marcellino in the 5th state senate district, Kemp Hannon in the 6th, Charles Fuschillo in the 8th, and Dean Skelos in the 9th. For races in the New York State Assembly, the party endorsed a slate composed almost entirely of incumbents: Joseph Saladino in the 12th district, Brian F. Curran in the 14th, Michael Montesano in the 15th, David McDonough in the 19th, and Edward Ra in the 21st (the Republican running to replace retiring Republican Thomas Alfano).

=== 2012 candidates ===
For the 2012 elections, the TRP again endorsed congressional candidates King, Stephen LaBate, and Becker; Marcellino, Hannon, Jack Martins, Fuschillo, and Skelos for the state senate; and McDonough, Montesano, Thomas McKevitt, Ra, David Sussman, Curran, and Sean Wright for the state assembly.

=== 2014 candidates ===
For the 2014 elections, the TRP again endorsed Marcellino, Hannon, Martins, Skelos and Michael Venditto for state senate and Saladino, McDonough, Montesano, McKevitt, Ra, Curran, Cornelius Todd Smith and Avi Fertig for state assembly. King was the only congressional candidate to run on the TRP line.

=== Platform ===
The Tax Revolt Party's primary agenda was to reduce what many residents saw as out-of-control taxes in Nassau County. The Tax Revolt Party stated intent was to restore disciplined fiscal management to Nassau County following what they argued was eight years of fiscal mismanagement under former County Executive Thomas Suozzi.

The Tax Revolt Party's platform included cutting wasteful spending, freezing and fixing Nassau's broken tax assessment system, ending the Home Energy Tax, and creating local jobs and opportunities.

== Personal life ==
Mangano is married. They have two children.

Both Mangano and his wife were sentenced to federal prison. Edward's prison sentence is 12 years in prison, and he was ordered to pay $10 million in restitution. Linda served 15 months for lying to the FBI and obstructing a grand jury, but only five months were in prison, and the remainder was home confinement.

== See also ==
- Nassau County Politics

Political offices
Preceded by Thomas Suozzi	County Executive of Nassau County, New York; 2010–2017	Succeeded by Laura Curran
