= 2014 New York State Senate election =

- November 4, 2014

All 63 seats in the New York State Senate 32 seats needed for a majority
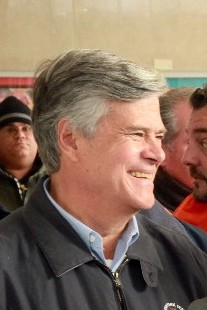

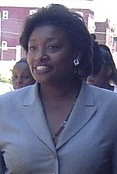

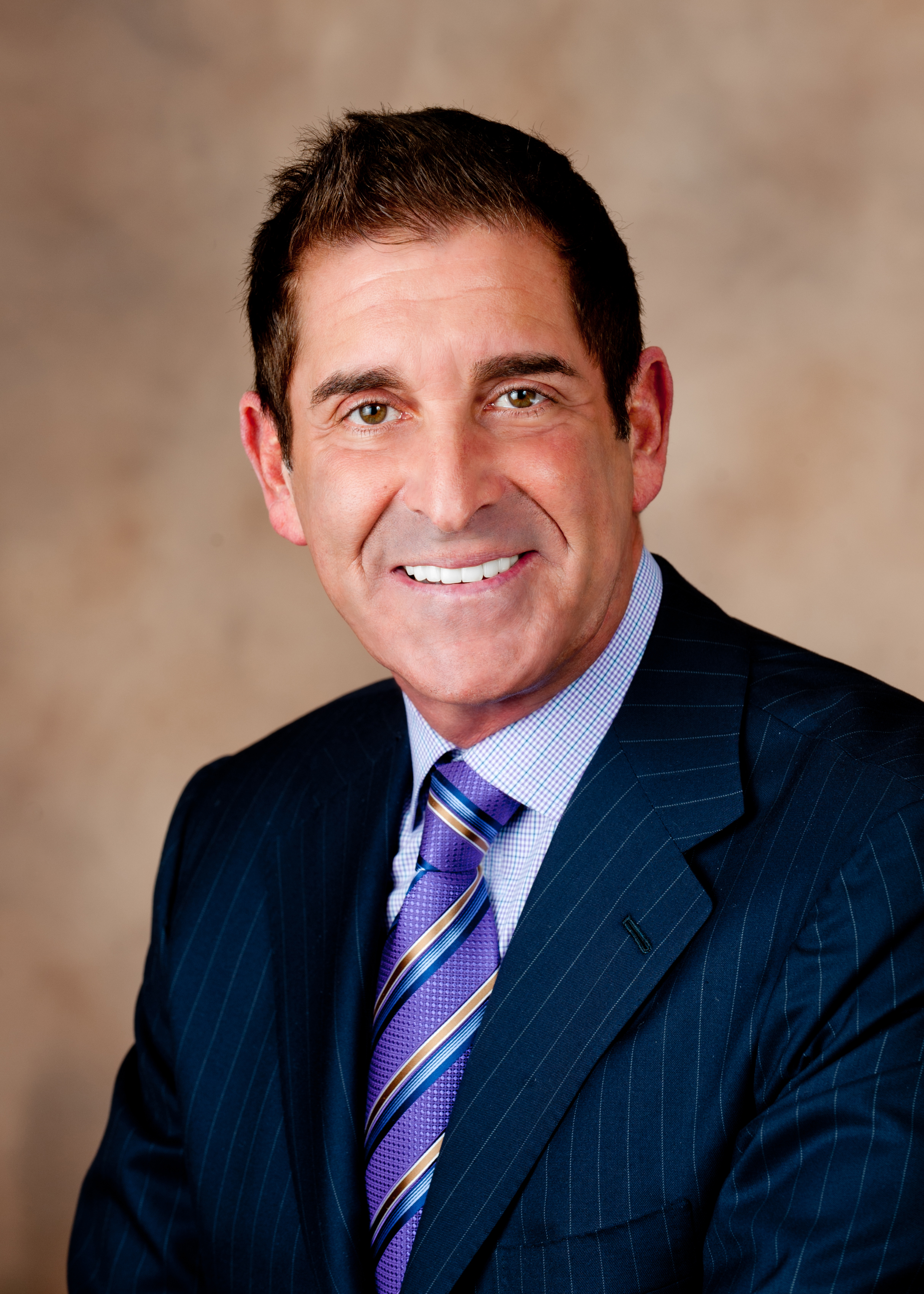
	Majority party	Minority party	Third party
Leader	Dean Skelos	Andrea Stewart-Cousins	Jeffrey D. Klein
Party	Republican	Democratic	IDC
Leader's seat	9th District	35th District
Seats before	30	28	5 (Note: After the 2012 elections but before the 2014 elections, Senator Malcolm Smith was expelled from the Independent Democratic Conference and Tony Avella joined it, resulting in no net change.)
Seats won	32	26	5
Seat change	▲2	▼2	Steady
- Results: Democratic hold Democratic gain Republican hold Republican gain Independent Democratic hold
Temporary President and Majority Leader before election
Dean Skelos
Republican
Temporary President and Majority Leader
Dean Skelos
Republican

The 2014 New York State Senate elections were held on November 4, 2014, to elect representatives from all 63 State Senate districts in the U.S. state of New York.

Republican candidates won 32 seats, while Democratic candidates won 31. The 41st, 46th, and 55th district flipped from Republican-controlled to Democratic-controlled, while the 60th district flipped from Democratic-controlled to Republican-controlled.

Dean Skelos and Andrea Stewart-Cousins retained their roles as Majority and Minority leader.

== Predictions ==
Source	Ranking	As of
Governing	Tossup	October 20, 2014
