= Lisa Vider =

American politician

Member-elect of the New York Senate from the 9th district
- Assuming office January 2027
- Succeeding: Patricia Canzoneri-Fitzpatrick

Personal details
- Party: Democratic

Lisa Malkie Vider is an American healthcare executive and politician. She is the Democratic member-elect of the New York State Senate from the 9th district. Prior to her victory, she became administrator of the Oceanview Manor Home for Adults in Coney Island in 2009.

== Biography ==
Vider was born in 1977 or 1978 in Brooklyn, where she was later raised. Her parents were a healthcare worker and a New York City Department of Education special education teacher. She attended Shulamith School for Girls, before going on to graduate from Brooklyn College.

In the late-1990s, Vider started working for the Oceanview Manor Home for Adults, a family-run for-profit in Coney Island. In 2009, she was promoted to administrator following the previous owner's death. The home has been the subject of ProPublica investigations of alleged poor living conditions, including poor sanitation, hostile staff, and crime, as well as police action involving an attempted murder.

Vider ran in the 2026 New York State Senate election from the 9th district located in Nassau County, citing a perceived lack of legislative understanding of healthcare as the reason. She criticized the Republican incumbent Patricia Canzoneri-Fitzpatrick for being ineffective as a legislator. Vider identified as a "moderate, fiscally conservative Democrat", and named affordability, antisemitism, healthcare, and public safety as campaign priorities. She won the Democratic nomination automatically without any primary opposition. She later won the general election 51% to 49%, defeating Canzoneri-Fitzpatrick and flipping the district.

A resident of Nassau County since 2013, Vider lives in Hewlett Bay Park, and has three children with her Israeli husband Avner Vider. Vider is Orthodox Jewish. Three of her nephews have served as Israel Defense Forces personnel.
