= Thomas Alfano =

American politician

Member of the New York State Assembly
- In office February 15, 1996 – December 31, 2010
- Preceded by: Vincent Muscarella
- Succeeded by: Ed Ra
- Constituency: 22nd district (1996–2002); 21st district (2003–2010)

Personal details
- Born: September 9, 1959 (age 66) New York City, U.S.
- Party: Republican
- Spouse: Jacqueline
- Children: 3
- Education: Fordham University
- Profession: Lawyer, politician

Thomas W. "Tom" Alfano (born September 9, 1959) is a former Republican member of the New York State Assembly, most recently representing the 21st Assembly district. The district includes Elmont, Franklin Square, North Valley Stream, Malverne, Floral Park, and West Hempstead.

== Biography ==
He was an honors graduate of St. Pius X Preparatory Seminary. He then earned a B.A. from Fordham University, where he was valedictorian. In 1984, he received a Juris Doctor degree from the Fordham University School of Law.

Alfano worked as an attorney at several law firms in New York City, including Skadden, Arps, Slate, Meagher & Flom. He is a member of the New York State Bar Association and the Nassau County Bar Association. He served as counsel to New York State Senate Deputy Majority Leader Dean G. Skelos from 1988 to 1996. He then became the Chairman of the Town of Hempstead Public Employees Relations Board from 1990 to 1996.

He became a member of the New York State Assembly in February 1996, after winning a special election. He stepped down from the Assembly at the end of 2010.

Alfano resides in North Valley Stream, New York. He and his wife Jacqueline have three children: Thomas Jr., Jacqueline, and Stephanie.

New York State Assembly
Preceded by Vincent Muscarella	New York State Assembly, 22nd District; February 1996–2002	Succeeded by Barry Grodenchik
Preceded by Robert Barra	New York State Assembly, 21st District; 2003–2010	Succeeded by Edward Ra
