= 2021 Nassau County Executive election =

- November 2, 2021
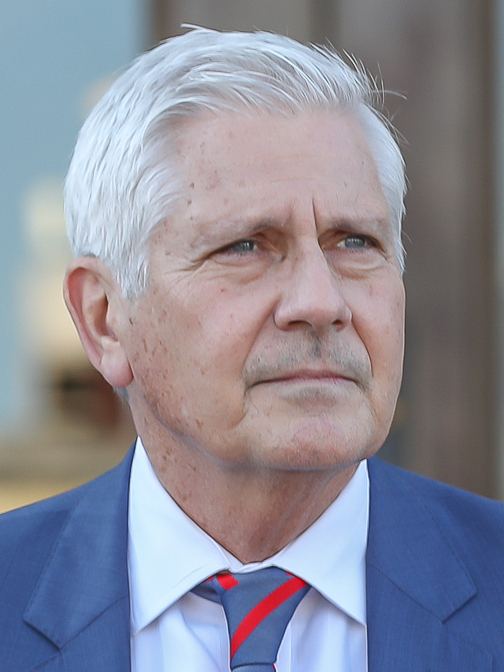

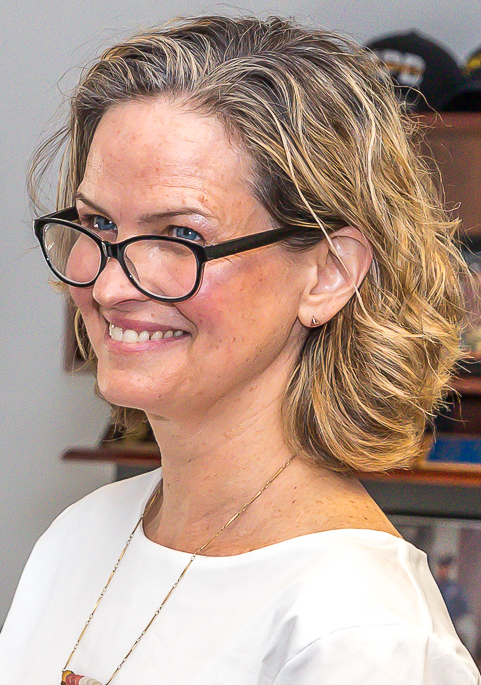
Candidate	Bruce Blakeman	Laura Curran
Party	Republican	Democratic
Alliance	Conservative	Common Sense
Popular vote	142,635	140,489
Percentage	50.35%	49.59%
- Blakeman: 50–60% 60–70% 70–80% 80–90% >90% Curran: 50–60% 60–70% 70–80% 80–90% >90% Tie: 50% No data
County Executive before election
Laura Curran
Democratic
Elected County Executive
Bruce Blakeman
Republican

The 2021 Nassau County, New York Executive election was held on November 2, 2021. The election was between incumbent county executive Laura Curran and former advisor to former county executive Bruce Blakeman. The elections were held on the same day as elections for county legislature. Blakeman defeated Curran by a close margin of 2,146 votes.

== General election ==
2021 Nassau County Executive election
Party	Candidate	Votes	Percentage
Republican	Bruce Blakeman	123,566	43.62%
Conservative	Bruce Blakeman	19,069	6.73%
Total	Bruce Blakeman	142,635	50.35%
Democratic	Laura Curran	138,596	48.93%
Common Sense	Laura Curran	1,893	0.67%
Total	Laura Curran (incumbent)	140,489	49.59%
Write-ins	N/A	155	0.05%
Totals		283,279	100.0%
Republican gain			
