= Vincent T. Muscarella =

American politician

Member of the Nassau County Legislature from the 8th district
- Incumbent
- Assumed office January 1, 1996
- Preceded by: Position established

Member of the New York State Assembly from the 22nd district
- In office November 1991 – December 31, 1995
- Preceded by: George H. Madison
- Succeeded by: Thomas Alfano

Personal details
- Born: September 23, 1954 (age 71) Nassau County, New York
- Party: Republican

Vincent T. Muscarella (born September 23, 1954) is an American politician who has served in the Nassau County Legislature from the 8th district since 1996. He previously served in the New York State Assembly from the 22nd district from 1991 to 1995.
