= Melissa Miller (politician) =

American politician

Member of the Hempstead Town Council from the 3rd district
- Incumbent
- Assumed office February 15, 2022
- Preceded by: Bruce Blakeman

Member of the New York State Assembly from the 20th district
- In office January 1, 2017 – February 7, 2022
- Preceded by: Todd Kaminsky
- Succeeded by: Ari Brown

Personal details
- Born: March 3, 1964 (age 62) Atlantic Beach, New York, U.S.
- Party: Republican
- Website: Official website

Melissa "Missy" Miller (born March 3, 1964) is an American politician from the state of New York. A Republican, Miller represents the Third Councilmanic District on the Hempstead Town Board. She represented the 20th Assembly District in the New York State Assembly from 2017 to 2022; the district included the city of Long Beach and portions of the town of Hempstead.

== Life and career ==
Miller was born and raised in Atlantic Beach, New York. A mother of three, Miller lost her oldest daughter to a rare disease. She has two other children, one of whom is chronically disabled. As a result, Miller is an advocate for disabled children. For many years, she has been a leader with Compassionate Care New York. Miller has worked professionally to train pediatric care professionals on how to properly care for chronically disabled children.

In 2016, Miller decided to make her first foray into public office by running for the New York State Assembly. While the 20th district had long been represented by Democrats, the district had lacked representation for nearly seven months after Todd Kaminsky was elected to the New York Senate. Facing no opposition for the Republican nomination, Miller went on to defeat Democrat Anthony Eramo, a Long Beach councilmember, in an upset on Election Day. In 2018, Miller was re-elected, defeating Democrat Juan C. Vides. Miller was again re-elected in 2020, defeating Democrat Gregory Marks.

On February 7, 2022, Miller announced that she was resigning from the Assembly to fill a vacancy on the Hempstead Town Board. Miller's decision was influenced by a family medical situation. Miller was appointed to the Hempstead Town Board on February 15, 2022; she represents the Third Councilmanic District.

Political offices
Preceded by Todd Kaminsky	Member of the New York State Assembly from the 20th district 2017–present	Incumbent
