= Ari Brown (politician) =

American politician (born 1975)

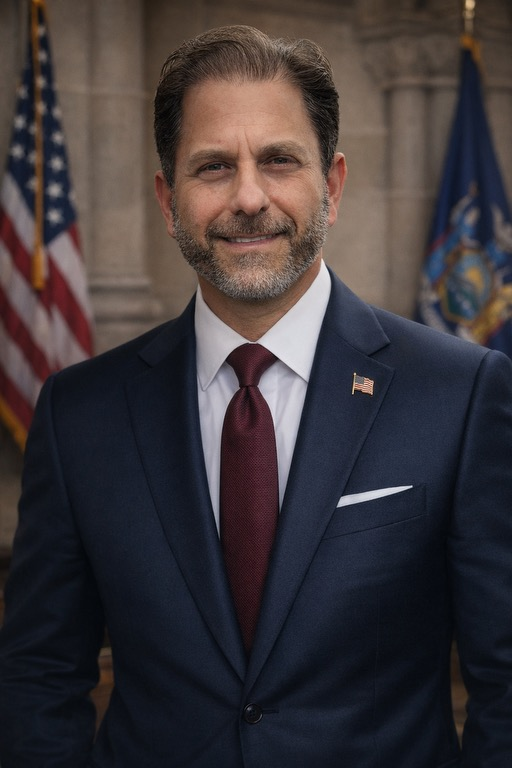
- Brown in 2025

Member of the New York State Assembly from the 20th district
- Incumbent
- Assumed office April 25, 2022
- Preceded by: Melissa Miller

Personal details
- Born: February 6, 1968 (age 58)
- Party: Republican
- Children: 7
- Website: Campaign website Legislative website

Eric "Ari" Brown (born February 6, 1968) is an American businessman and politician serving as a member of the New York State Assembly from the 20th district in a special election on April 7, 2022, and was sworn in on April 25, 2022. He is a Republican. He currently serves as a trustee of Cedarhurst including as deputy mayor and runs a construction business.

== New York State Assembly ==
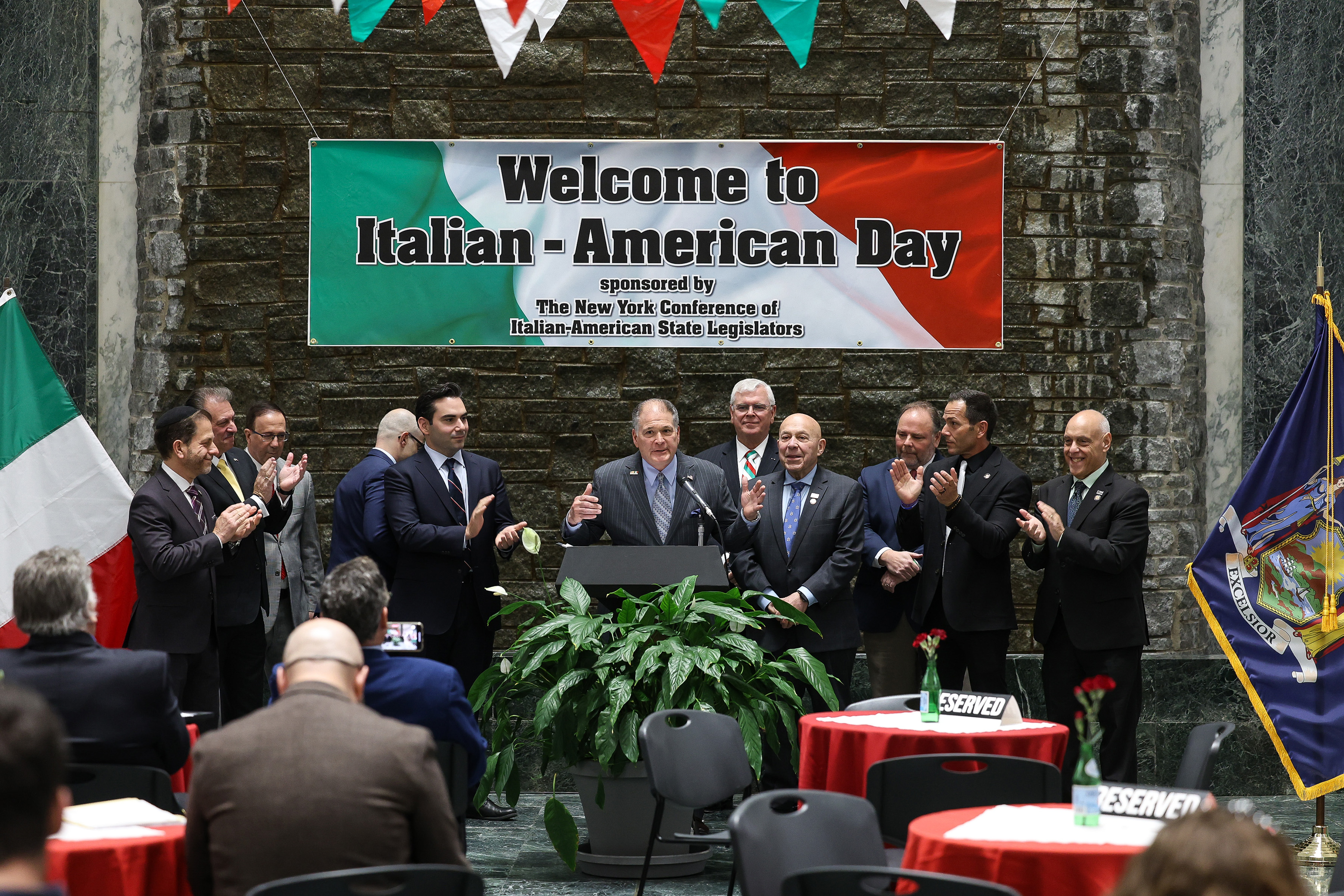
Brown (furthest left) at a press conference for Italian-American Day on May 19, 2025

Brown was the Republican and Conservative Party's nominee for a special election on April 7, 2022, called after incumbent Melissa Miller resigned to join the Hempstead Town Council. He faced Democratic nominee David Lobl. He was sworn into the office on April 25, 2022, becoming the first Republican Orthodox Jew elected to the body. He named repealing cashless bail and congestion pricing in New York City as well as stopping transit and toll price increases as priorities in office.

=== Tenure ===
In March 2025, Brown introduced legislation that would prohibit administration of the COVID-19 mRNA vaccine and direct the New York State Department of Health to study it further, also stating that he had received the measles vaccine and encouraged others to get it but took no issue with U.S. Secretary of Health and Human Services Robert F. Kennedy Jr.'s skepticism of the vaccine’s safety.

Brown was cut off by chairman J. Gary Pretlow for asking a series questions concerning antisemitism when mayor of New York City Zohran Mamdani testified before the legislature's budget committee in February 2026.

== Personal life ==
Brown resides in Cedarhurst, New York, and has 7 children. He is an Orthodox Jew.
