= Jewish Center of Atlantic Beach =

Modern Orthodox synagogue on Atlantic Beach, Long Island, New York, US

- Location on Long Island, New York

Religion
- Affiliation: Modern Orthodox Judaism
- Ecclesiastical or organisational status: Synagogue
- Leadership: Rabbi Elie Weinstock; Rabbi Simcha Willig; Rabbi Saul Haimoff (Youth)
- Status: Active

Location
- Location: 100 Nassau Avenue, Atlantic Beach, Nassau County, Long Island, New York 11509
- Country: United States
- Coordinates: 40°35′12″N 73°43′33″W

Architecture
- Established: 1953 (as a congregation)
- Materials: Brick

Website
- jewishcenterofatlanticbeach.org

The Jewish Center of Atlantic Beach (JCAB) is a Modern Orthodox Jewish congregation and synagogue, located on Nassau Avenue in Atlantic Beach, Nassau County, Long Island, New York, in the United States.

Founded in 1953, JCAB is the primary synagogue in the Atlantic Beach village, serving the local Jewish community of approximately 250 families.

Rabbi Samuel Klibanoff served as the Rabbi of the Congregation for eleven years, from 2004 until 2015. Following his departure, Rabbi Ari Perl assumed the role for three years. The congregation had a temporary rabbi, Rabbi Prus. During the summer months, Rabbi Simcha Willig, son of Rabbi Mordechai Willig, has served as a visiting rabbi. As of January 2024, the senior rabbi was Rabbi Elie Weinstock. He was supported by Rabbi Simcha Willig and Rabbi Saul Haimoff.

== Notable members ==
- Bruce Blakeman, politician
- J. Ezra Merkin, a businessman
- Ira Rennert, a businessman and philanthropist
- Leonard N. Stern, a businessman and philanthropist
- Max Stern, a businessman and philanthropist
- Henry Sweica, a businessman and philanthropist
