= Brian F. Curran =

American politician

Brian Curran

Member of the New York State Assembly from the 21st district
- In office January 1, 2023 – December 31, 2024
- Preceded by: Judy Griffin
- Succeeded by: Judy Griffin
- In office January 1, 2011 – December 31, 2018
- Preceded by: Robert Barra
- Succeeded by: Judy Griffin

19th Mayor of Lynbrook
- In office 2008 – December 31, 2010
- Preceded by: Eugene E. Scarpato
- Succeeded by: William Hendrick

Personal details
- Born: November 1, 1968 (age 57) Lynbrook, New York, U.S.
- Party: Republican
- Spouse: Rosemarie Ciaccio-Curran
- Children: 4
- Education: Wilkes University; CUNY Law School
- Profession: Lawyer, Politician
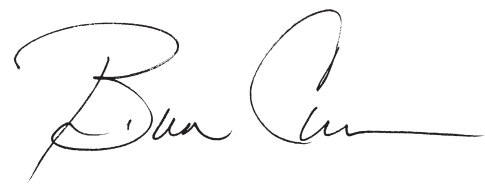
- Signature
- Website: Official website

Brian F. Curran (born November 1, 1968) is an American politician from Lynbrook, New York. Curran was elected to the New York State Assembly in 2010. His district includes parts of Lynbrook, Valley Stream, Rockville Centre, South Hempstead and portions of Baldwin, Oceanside, East Rockaway, Malverne and North Lynbrook. He was defeated by Judy Griffin of Rockville Centre in the November, 2018 general election. In 2022, he won his old seat back by defeating Griffin in a rematch.

Curran graduated from Our Lady of Peace Elementary School and graduated from St. Agnes Cathedral High School in 1986. He received his undergraduate degree in 1990 from Wilkes University. In 1994 he earned his Juris Doctor from CUNY Law School. Soon after graduation, he was admitted to the New York State and Connecticut Bars.

Upon graduating from law school, Curran was employed as legislative counsel to the New York State Assembly. He joined the Nassau County County Attorney's Office as Deputy County Attorney in the Litigation Bureau and Municipal Contracts from 1996 to 2001, and later as Assistant Village Prosecutor of Lynbrook, where he served until 2007.

In 2001, he entered into private practice as an associate trial attorney with the forty-year-old law firm of Nicolini, Paradise, Ferretti and Sabella. In 2007, he was elected the 19th Mayor of the Village of Lynbrook, where he served until his election to the State Assembly.

Curran lost his seat in the 2018 Midterm Elections to political newcomer Judy Griffin from Rockville Centre. Her win was considered a surprising blow to what thought of as a safe Republican seat, and defied polling data.

Curran resides in Lynbrook with his wife Rosemarie Ciaccio-Curran and their children: Isabella, Jake, Riley and Logan.
