= Laura Curran =

Canadian-American politician (born 1967)

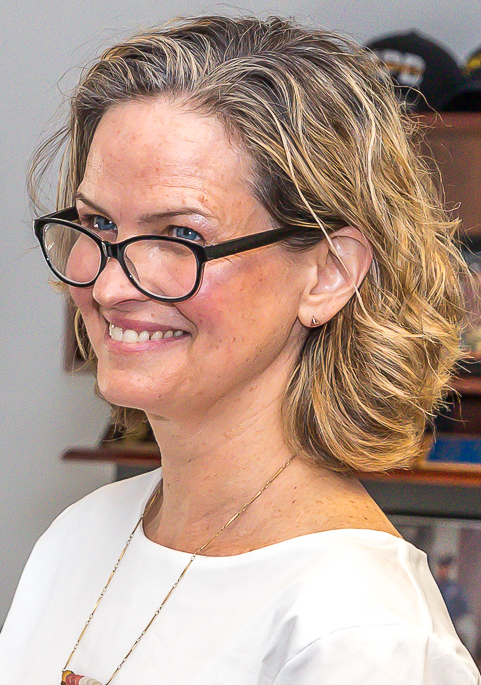

9th Nassau County Executive
- In office January 1, 2018 – December 31, 2021
- Preceded by: Ed Mangano
- Succeeded by: Bruce Blakeman

Member of the Nassau County Legislature from the 5th district
- In office January 1, 2014 – December 31, 2017
- Preceded by: Joe Scannell
- Succeeded by: Debra Mule

Personal details
- Born: December 31, 1967 (age 58) St. Catharines, Ontario
- Party: Democratic
- Education: Sarah Lawrence College (BA)

Laura Curran (born December 31, 1967) is a Canadian-born American politician who served as the 9th county executive of Nassau County, New York from 2018 to 2021, the first woman to hold the office. Curran worked as a reporter before serving in the Nassau County Legislature.

== Early life and education ==
Curran was born in St. Catharines, Ontario, Canada. She moved frequently as a child, and before turning 18, lived in Belgium, Pembroke Pines, Florida, Five Towns, New York City, Los Angeles, and Washington, D.C.

In 1989, Curran earned a Bachelor of Arts in Liberal Arts from Sarah Lawrence College.

== Career ==
Curran previously served in the Nassau County Legislature from 2014 to 2017 and as a local school board member in her hometown of Baldwin. Prior to holding elective office, Curran worked as a reporter for the New York Daily News and New York Post.

== Nassau County Executive ==
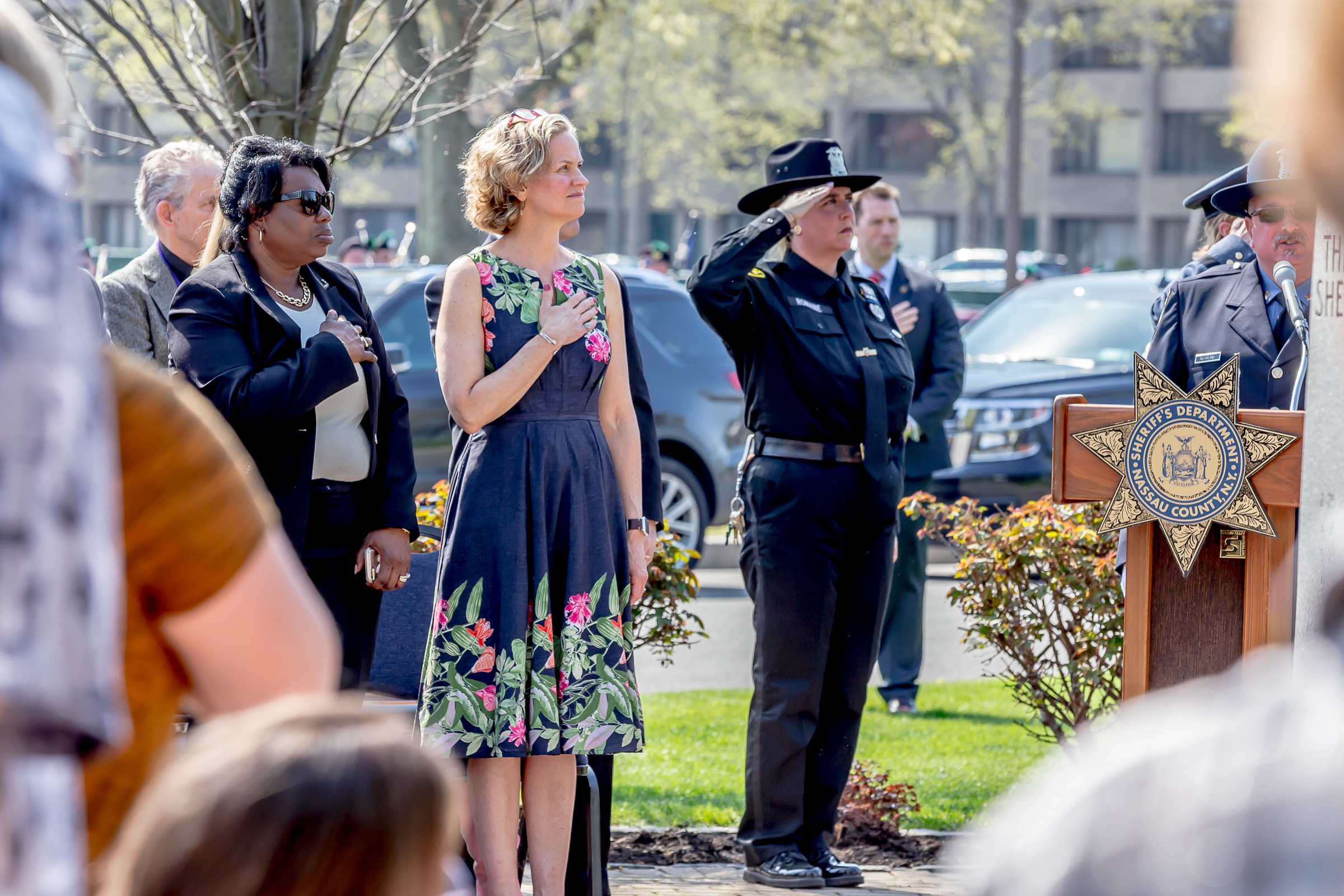
County Executive Curran at Memorial Service

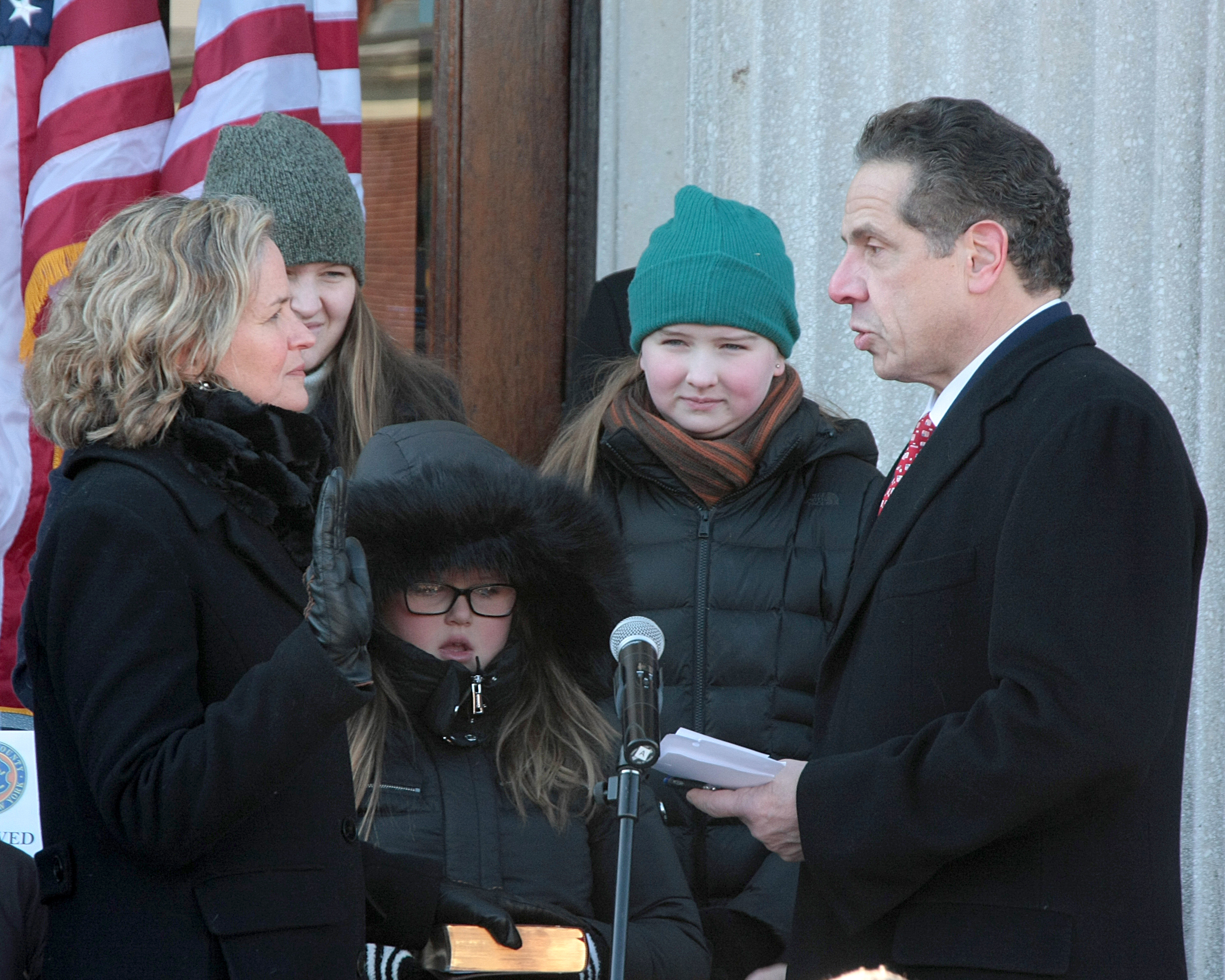
Curran Sworn in by then-Governor of New York Andrew Cuomo

In 2017, Curran won a September 12 primary against Nassau County Comptroller George Maragos, who switched parties from Republican to Democratic.

In the general election, Curran won a contentious campaign against former New York State Senator and Mineola Village Mayor Jack Martins. The then sitting Nassau County Executive, Ed Mangano, had decided not to run for re-election following an indictment on federal corruption charges.

The campaign between Curran and Martins touched on gang violence (MS-13) and runaway property taxes, but ultimately centered on ethics. When polls closed on election night Curran, an underdog in the historically Republican Nassau County, had won 52 percent to 48 percent. She is the third Democrat to hold the position in 80 years.

Curran was sworn into office on January 1, 2018, by then-Governor of New York Andrew Cuomo on the steps of the Theodore Roosevelt Executive and Legislative Building.

On November 16, 2021, Laura Curran conceded the race for Nassau County Executive to Republican challenger Bruce Blakeman and left office on December 31, 2021. She attributed her loss to her name being on the same ballot as State Senator Todd Kaminsky, Democrat of Long Beach, for Nassau County District Attorney. He was the author of the bail reform law that disgruntled many Long Islanders.

=== Administration and policies ===
Among Curran's first hires were former Long Island Rail Road President Helena Williams and former New York City Budget Director under Mayor Michael Bloomberg Mark Page. Williams was the railroad's longest-serving president in several decades, president of the nation's busiest commuter railroad, and the first woman to run any Metropolitan Transportation Authority agency. Page, as director of the city's Office of Management and Budget under NYC Mayor Michael Bloomberg, oversaw the city's finances through the September 11 terror attacks, the Great Recession, and Super Storm Sandy.

Other early hires included an assistant state attorney general and former special counsel to the New York State Attorney General Public Integrity Bureau to enforce new ethics and procurement reform policies. Curran also appointed the first permanent commissioner of the Nassau County Police Department in more than four years. Curran's appointment, Patrick Ryder, previously served as commanding officer of the Asset Forfeiture and Intelligence Unit. Within the department, Ryder was largely credited with widespread adoption of new advances in technology to assist in crime reduction. Examples include Nassau's successful use of gunfire locator technology to reduce gun crime.

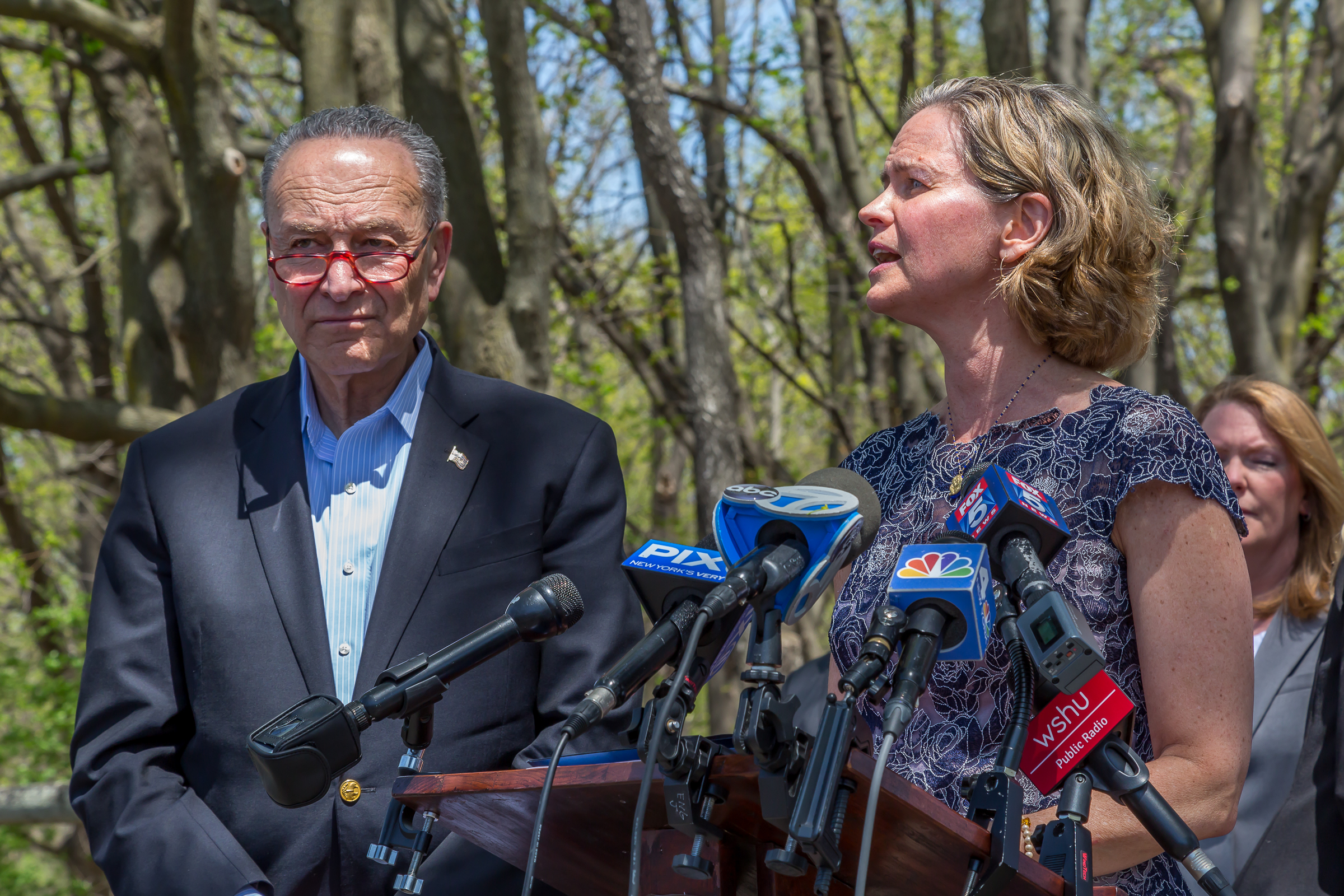
Curran at press conference with Senator Chuck Schumer

==== Assessment and tax relief ====
Under Curran's predecessor, Nassau County froze the tax rolls in 2011. The rolls would remain frozen for nearly seven years. According to an exposè, the policy resulted in a $1.7 billion shift in the property tax burden that largely benefited wealthy residents over low-income, middle-class and elderly residents. In effect, the policy created a "separate and unequal" tax assessment and challenge system that benefited those who frequently challenged their annual property tax assessment over others who did not or were unable to do so.

To address the issue Curran issued an executive order unfreezing the tax rolls in March 2018 and signed legislation that would allow for the reassessment of all county properties by 2019. Additionally, Curran introduced a proposal providing tax relief to the homeowners who shouldered the majority of the tax burden shift under the 2011 freeze. The proposal called for a five-year, partial tax exemption that would be granted to owner of homes built before the freeze began in 2010, are assessed at a high level, and are worth $1 million or less. The resulting exemption would primarily benefit middle-income property owners who have not challenged their assessments successfully since the 2011 freeze and resultant tax shift.

==== Public safety and opioids ====
Upon taking office Curran confronted the growing opioid epidemic which saw the drug claiming a record number of lives in the region. Curran, and Commissioner Ryder, quickly established a tech and intel-driven response to the opioid and heroin crises by working in conjunction with the U.S. DEA HIDTA program. Through the HIDTA program Curran and Ryder were able to fund and roll out the Overdose Detection Mapping Application Program (OD Map). Through ODMap police track overdoses reported to hospitals, fire and police officials and are able to predict waves of overdoses and try to prevent them as well as the crimes that often follow drug use. Curran, Ryder, and the program gained national attention when early results showed a precipitous drop in both fatal and non-fatal overdoses; 32 and 34 percent respectively.

==== Reforms ====
Curran signed an executive order barring appointees from holding leadership positions in political parties or donating to her campaign. At the time the measure was considered to be the first in New York State history. Shortly after, Curran issued a "zero-tolerance" executive order banning gift-giving among vendors and employees involved with procurement or contracting procedures. Previously county employees could not accept gifts worth $75 or more.

==== Removal of names from signs ====
During the campaign Curran pledged that if elected she would remove the county executive's name from the county's parks and welcome signs. The pledge was a sharp break with tradition and an unusual measure by political standards. Of the pledge, The New York Times wrote, "Across the county's many parks, large signs welcome visitors with the county executive's name in giant letters, with the park's name in a smaller typeface. Ms. Curran has asked the county's public works department to simply remove the county executive's name altogether." Curran criticized the signs as self-promotional and a waster of taxpayer dollars.

==== Marijuana legalization ====
In opposition to rising public opinion of her electorate and popular sentiment within the New York State Legislature, controlled by the Democratic Party in all three chambers at the time, Curran took a hardline stance against the legalization of recreational marijuana and announced that she intended to have Nassau County opt-out of the clause which would legalize marijuana that was included in an early version of the 2019 New York State Budget.

==== Bail reform ====
Following a measure that eliminated cash bail passed by the New York State Legislature as part of the 2019 budget and was hailed as a landmark progressive legislation by supporters, Curran vigorously spoke out against the legislation to numerous media outlets, appeared on Fox News to oppose bail reform, and continued on efforts to form a coalition against the legislation.

== Personal life ==
Curran lives in Baldwin, a hamlet in the town of Hempstead, New York. She is married and has three daughters.
