= Retired Police Association of NY =

RPA
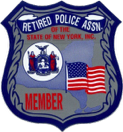
- Founded: 1950
- Headquarters: Nassau County, New York, United States
- Website: Official website

The Retired Police Association (RPA) of the state of New York, is an organization representing retired NY Police Officers. The RPA has now been in existence for over 65 years, with over 4700 members from over 150 police departments from across the state of New York.

== History ==
The RPA of NY was founded by Harold Strohson, Esq. in 1950 on Long Island. The goals and purpose of the association are...

"...the welfare, comradeship and assistance of members as well as perpetuating the memory of those deceased and aiding their widows and children."

— RPA of NY,

Over the decades, the above statement has never changed, however the RPA has expanded to include voicing the needs and concerns of police officers within NY, to lobbying legislature to public officials.

In 1977, as membership within the RPA increased, the need for effectively communicating information came in the form of the RPA newsletter. Today, the newsletter is published 10 months of the year, and is distributed to members worldwide.

By 1983, the RPA became closely related with a small group of retiree organizations known as the Alliance of Public Retirees, who also met and discussed relative retiree matters on a monthly basis. The group continued to grow, and in 1991 formalized under the name of Alliance of Public Retiree Organizations of New York, and is recognized statewide as one of the most active and effective organizations involved in lobbying for legislative process in Albany, New York.

In 1998, to provide an additional service to their members and their members families, the RPA created the Memorial Scholarship Program. The scholarships are to be awarded to children or grand children of an active or deceased member.
