= Bruce Blakeman =

American politician (born 1955)

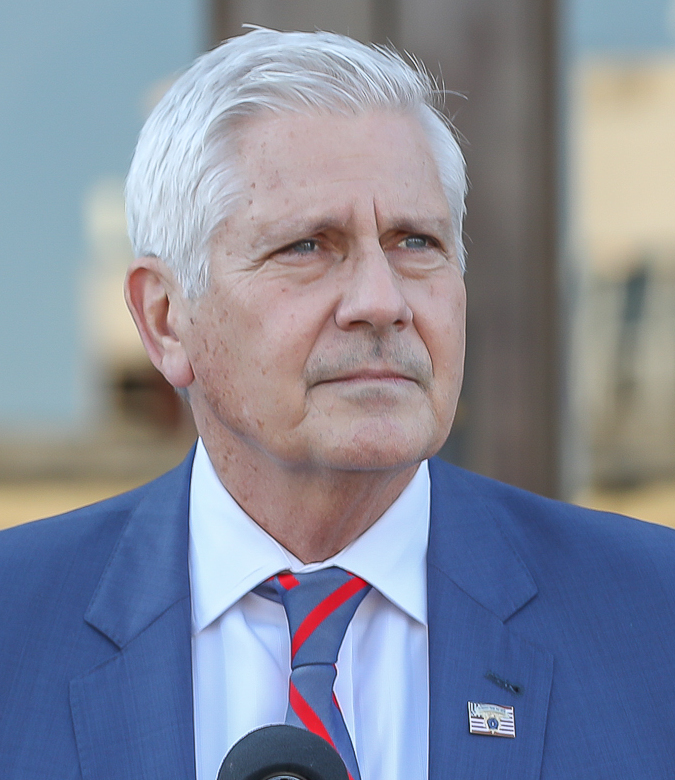
- Blakeman in 2022

10th Nassau County Executive
- Incumbent
- Assumed office January 1, 2022
- Preceded by: Laura Curran

Member of the Nassau County Legislature from the 7th district
- In office January 1, 1995 – December 31, 1999
- Preceded by: Constituency established
- Succeeded by: Jeff Toback

Personal details
- Born: Bruce Arthur Blakeman; October 2, 1955 (age 71) Valley Stream, New York, U.S.
- Party: Republican
- Spouses: Nancy Shevell (m. 1984; div. 2007); Segal Magori (m. 2015)
- Children: 1
- Education: Arizona State University, Tempe (BA); California Western School of Law (JD)
- Website: Office website Campaign website

Bruce Arthur Blakeman (born October 2, 1955) is an American attorney and politician currently serving as the 10th county executive of Nassau County, New York. A Republican, Blakeman was first elected in 2021, defeating Democratic incumbent Laura Curran and becoming the county's first Jewish county executive. He previously served as a commissioner for the New York-New Jersey Port Authority, as well as a Nassau County legislator and Hempstead town councilman. He was the Republican nominee in the 2026 New York gubernatorial election, losing to Democratic incumbent Kathy Hochul by about twenty percentage points.

== Early life and education ==
Blakeman, a native of Nassau County, was born in Oceanside, New York and raised in Valley Stream. Blakeman's father was Assemblyman Robert M. Blakeman. His mother, Betty, served in the Women's Army Corps and his father was a merchant mariner and later Naval Reserve officer. His brother, Brad Blakeman, served on the staff of President George W. Bush.

Blakeman attended Valley Stream Central High School. He earned a Bachelor of Arts degree in political science and government from Arizona State University and a Juris Doctor from the California Western School of Law. During school, he worked on Republican political campaigns and, for a time, was a driver for former First Lady Nancy Reagan. Blakeman also holds a certificate in homeland security management from Long Island University.

== Career ==
After passing the bar examination, Blakeman worked as a partner at his father's law firm.

In 1993, federal district court judge Arthur D. Spatt ruled Nassau County's Board of Supervisors to be in violation of one man, one vote. The Board of Supervisors authorized the creation of the Nassau County Legislature as a successor to their body. Elections were held in November 1995, and Blakeman, at the time a Hempstead town Councilman, was elected to the first legislative class to represent the 7th district. He was also elected the body's first presiding officer. The body took their seats on January 1, 1996.

In 1998, Blakeman was the Republican nominee for New York State Comptroller. He lost in the general election to incumbent Democrat Carl McCall by a wide margin.

During a particularly bad election year for Nassau County Republicans, Blakeman lost his seat in the Legislature in the election of November 1999 to Jeff Toback, and the Republicans lost the majority.

In June 2001, Blakeman was appointed by New York Governor George Pataki as a commissioner of the Port Authority of New York and New Jersey. He held that position until 2009.

In 2007, as a member of the New York law firm Abrams, Fensterman, Fensterman, Eisman, Greenberg, Formato & Einige, Blakeman brokered the purchase of 52 acres of land in Melville by Canon USA for the construction of new headquarters. About 1,200 people worked at their old Lake Success offices at the time. Previous attempts to move their headquarters to Westbury and Brookville were unsuccessful, and Canon was expected to move out of state if the deal fell through. Long Island Business News reported that Blakeman received a "multimillion-dollar" commission for the sale.

In the 2010 special election, Blakeman ran for United States Senate, but lost the Republican primary to former congressman Joe DioGuardi; he contested the general election under the Tax Revolt party line. In 2014, Blakeman ran for the 4th congressional district, after incumbent Carolyn McCarthy announced her retirement. He won the Republican nomination, but was defeated 53% to 47% in the general election by Democrat Kathleen Rice.

=== Hempstead Town Councilman ===
Blakeman served on the Hempstead Town Council from 1993 to 1995.

In January 2015, Blakeman was appointed to the Hempstead Town Council, replacing James Darcy.

In 2017, Blakeman joined fellow Republican councilwoman Erin King-Sweeney in endorsing Democratic challenger Laura Gillen in the race for Hempstead Town Supervisor. Gillen, who ran against incumbent Town Supervisor Republican Anthony Santino, went on to win the election, becoming the first Democratic Hempstead Town Supervisor in over 100 years. Gillen named Blakeman Deputy Town Supervisor.

In 2019, Blakeman and King-Sweeney endorsed Republican Receiver of Taxes Donald X. Clavin Jr. against Democratic Town Supervisor Laura Gillen for Town Supervisor. Clavin went on to win against Gillen.

Blakeman was succeeded on the Hempstead town council by Republican Assemblywoman Melissa Miller.

=== Nassau County Executive ===
==== Elections ====
In March 2021, Blakeman was chosen by Nassau Republicans to run against incumbent Democratic Nassau county executive Laura Curran. In the 2021 election he won with 50.35% of the vote, which was considered surprising in a county with 100,000 more registered Democrats than Republicans.

In 2025, Blakeman was re-elected as Nassau county executive, defeating Democrat Seth Koslow. The victory came despite Democrats holding a 110,000-voter registration advantage over Republicans in the county.

Blakeman ran on a platform that highlighted public safety and fiscal responsibility. That message resonated with Independent voters, who favored Blakeman over his opponent by a roughly 2:1 margin.

==== Budgets ====
On September 19, 2022, Blakeman introduced his annual budget proposal for the 2023 fiscal year. This proposal kept tax rates the same and added nearly 100 additional law enforcement positions.

On September 16, 2024, Blakeman signed the county's 2025 budget plan, totaling $4.2 billion. The budget maintains property taxes at the same level as the previous year, ensuring no increase for both 2024 and 2025. It includes provisions for 206 new hires, such as two police cadet classes and two correction officer classes. An additional $22 million has been allocated for early intervention and preschool services for children. The budget assumes no growth in sales tax revenue, which constitutes 45% of the county's total revenue.

Blakeman's salary in 2022 and 2023 was $211,821. In 2024, a cost-of-living adjustment increased that to $227,959.

==== Face masks ====
During his campaign, Blakeman promised to fight the state's face mask mandate and vaccination mandate intended to address the COVID-19 pandemic. Upon taking office, he signed an executive order making masks optional, contravening the state mandate. On January 24 a New York Supreme Court justice in Nassau County declared the mandate unconstitutional under the state constitution, but an Appellate Division justice stayed the ruling the next day. In February the mask mandate was lifted in most circumstances, rendering the case moot.

On August 14, 2024, Blakeman signed into law the Mask Transparency Act, an act introduced by county legislator Mazi Pilip. It was voted on and passed by the legislature on August 5, 2024. The Mask Transparency Act prohibits the usage of a mask or facial covering to conceal one's identity within Nassau County. Exceptions to the bill are granted for individuals with health concerns or religious obligations. The bill seeks to eliminate anti-Semitism and hate crimes in the county that occur during protests. Violation of the act results in a misdemeanor charge of up to US$1,000, imprisonment for up to a year, or both. The first arrest under this law involved a teenager, Wesslin Omar Ramirez Castillo, who was found carrying a knife and wearing a ski mask. A lawsuit challenging the law was dismissed in September 2024, upholding the ban's enforcement.

==== Nassau Coliseum ====
Blakeman is a proponent of a lease from Nassau County to the Las Vegas Sands entertainment company to redevelop the site of the Nassau Coliseum, including the construction of a casino. The deal passed the Nassau County Legislature with a vote of 17–1 with one recusal to transfer the Coliseum lease to the Sands. Hofstra University filed suit against the deal, claiming that the county violated the state open meetings law by not adequately providing enough transparent, public hearings for the project. Hofstra had also been critical of the project due to possible increases in crime, traffic and gambling addiction. On November 10, 2023, a state judge ruled in Hofstra's favor and struck down the deal. In May 2024, Blakeman announced that the county would resubmit the lease-transfer application.

On January 17, 2024, Blakeman and Nassau Legislative Presiding Officer Howard Kopel announced the issuance of subpoenas to Hofstra University President Susan Poser. Blakeman and Kopel accused Poser of colluding with Hard Rock International, a direct competitor for the casino license. Hard Rock and Hofstra stated that neither had been in touch with the other. Hofstra described the subpoenas as retaliatory and an "attempt to distract and impede a fair and open process."

==== Public safety ====
Blakeman opposes the 2019 New York bail reform law and has called for its repeal. Shortly after taking office, he issued an executive order permitting the Nassau County Police Department to disclose when a person released without bail is rearrested.

In March 2023, preceding Ramadan, Passover, Easter, and a campaign visit from then-presidential candidate Ron DeSantis, Blakeman created a patrol unit within the Nassau County Police Department modeled on the NYPD's "Hercules" counterterrorism unit.

On May 24, 2023, Blakeman held a rally and press conference in Manhattan in support of West Islip resident Daniel Penny. Penny, a former Marine, was arrested by the NYPD on a charge of fatally choking Jordan Neely, a homeless man who was allegedly acting in a threatening manner, aboard a New York City subway train on May 1 in Chinatown. Over the course of the rally, 3 counter-demonstrators were arrested.

In July 2024, The New York Times reported that Blakeman had recruited 75 people for a force of "special deputies" to deploy during emergencies. Many of them were former police officers. Critics described it as a militia force answering only to him. Blakeman was sued in February 2025 by Democratic county legislators opposing the special deputy force.

==== Women's sports ====
On February 22, 2024, Blakeman issued an executive order banning women's sports teams that include transgender women from using county facilities. The ban applies to youth, college, and professional sports. Sports teams including transgender men were not targeted. In a press conference beforehand, Blakeman repeatedly referred to transgender women as "bullies" and "biological males," and recommended that they join men's or co-ed teams instead. State Democratic leadership and Long Island LGBTQ advocates condemned the order as discriminatory and illegal under state law, and accused Blakeman of using the controversy over transgender people in sports for self-promotion.

State attorney general Letitia James issued a cease-and-desist letter to Blakeman; he sued the attorney general in response. In March the Long Island Roller Rebels, represented by the New York Civil Liberties Union, filed suit against Blakeman over the order. Later that month Caitlyn Jenner made an appearance with Blakeman in support of the ban. In April, district court judge Nusrat Jahan Choudhury denied a request from Blakeman for a restraining order against James preventing her from blocking the executive order. Later that month, Choudhury dismissed his suit against James.

On May 11, a state judge struck down the order on the grounds that the county executive lacked the authority to impose the ban. The county legislature passed a similar ban the next month, voting along party lines. This new ban was met with similar litigation. On January 21, 2025, another state judge denied a request from the Roller Rebels to suspend the ban while litigation played out.

On November 4, 2026, the Second Department of the Appellate Division of the State Supreme Court ruled in favor of the Roller Rebels, striking down Blakeman's ban on transgender athletes using County facilities with their preferred gender identity.

==== Other issues ====
During the 2022 Russian invasion of Ukraine in February, Blakeman helped conduct a rifle drive which resulted in the collection of 60 rifles for Ukraine at a Nassau County gun shop. At the time it was unclear how the rifles would be sent to Ukraine: a Homeland Security said that a weapons shipment would have to be approved by the Department of State. A couple weeks later, the Florida gun manufacturer Kel-Tec agreed to deliver the donated guns to Ukraine as part of a larger shipment of 400 weapons.

On January 11, 2023, Blakeman joined Nassau Republican Chairman Joseph Cairo and other elected officials to call for the resignation of Congressman George Santos. Blakeman pledged not to work with Santos, criticizing him for lying about his resume, and falsely claiming his grandparents were Holocaust survivors.

While walking in the 2023 Stewart Manor 4 July parade, a 10-year-old girl from Franklin Square threw a water balloon at Blakeman, striking him in the head. It is a long-standing tradition to throw water balloons at fire engines and politicians at this parade. Video of the incident went viral, having been viewed 40 million times as of August 2, 2023. Many viewers mistook Blakeman for Mike Pence. Blakeman located the girl and her family, and worked with New York Yankees President Randy Levine to bring her to a Yankee game and watch batting practice from the field.

In August 2023, during the New York City migrant housing crisis, Queens Borough President Donovan Richards suggested that migrants could be housed at the Nassau Coliseum. Blakeman responded that Nassau County had no plans for "any migrant program". Soon after, Governor Hochul said the state could not and would not force migrants to move within the state, nor could it force counties to shelter them.

Following the 2023 Hamas-led attack on Israel, on October 11, Blakeman held a rally in support of Israel at the Harry Chapin Lakeside Theater in Eisenhower Park. 6,000 people were reported to have attended. Aid for Israeli Defense Force soldiers was collected at the rally. On November 28, 2023, Blakeman called for the resignation of Susan Poser, president of Hofstra University, over a letter she sent to the Hofstra community about the Hamas attacks in Israel. Blakeman accused Poser, who is Jewish, of anti-semitism.

According to media reports, Blakeman ordered county agencies to not lower the American flag in respect following the death of former President Jimmy Carter, despite orders from Governor Kathy Hochul.

=== Support for Donald Trump ===
In March 2024, Blakeman attended the wake of NYPD officer Jonathan Diller alongside Donald Trump and Eric Adams in Massapequa.

Blakeman held and attended a rally for Trump at the Nassau Veterans Memorial Coliseum in Uniondale during September 2024, prior to the elections in November.

On Monday, October 7, 2024, Trump visited the Ohel gravesite in Queens for the first anniversary of the October 7 attacks. Blakeman, Ben Shapiro, Lee Zeldin, and other political figures accompanied Trump.

=== 2026 New York gubernatorial campaign ===
Following several visits to various areas of New York, Blakeman announced on December 9, 2025, that he was entering the race for governor in the 2026 election against incumbent Democrat Kathy Hochul. In interviews following the announcement, he said he would be using his track record in Nassau County as a model for how he would handle crime and rising costs. After the unexpected exit of his challenger Elise Stefanik on December 20, 2025, President Donald Trump endorsed Blakeman.

During the campaign, Blakeman supported a strike by Long Island Rail Road workers.

In August 2026, the chair of New York State Democratic Committee wrote to the New York State Board of Elections filing a complaint about Blakeman's campaign ads made with AI, claiming they violate state election law. After the complain was filed, Blakeman responded "Everybody knows it's AI, and it's funny—so what's your problem?" In September, Hell Gate NYC reported that Blakeman ran a campaign ad which featured a clip of comedian Justin Tyler, but had not reached out to Tyler for permission to use the clip.

In December 2025, Blakeman described himself as a "pro-choice Republican" and said he supported a legal right to abortion early in pregnancy.

On November 3, 2026, Blakeman lost the race to Hochul by about twenty percentage points.

== Personal life ==
Blakeman married Segal Magori Blakeman in 2015, and they live together in Atlantic Beach, New York. He was previously married to Nancy Shevell, who is now married to Paul McCartney of The Beatles. He has one son and two stepchildren. Blakeman is the first Jewish Nassau County executive. He is a member of the Jewish Center of Atlantic Beach, a Modern Orthodox synagogue.

His nephew, New York State Court Officer Tommy Jurgens, was killed in the line of duty on 9/11 while assisting in the evacuation of Tower 2 of the World Trade Center. Blakeman provided a DNA sample to identify his nephew's remains.

Party political offices
Preceded by Herbert London	Republican nominee for Comptroller of New York; 1998	Succeeded by John Faso
Preceded by Lee Zeldin	Republican nominee for Governor of New York; 2026	Most recent
Political offices
Preceded by Laura Curran	Nassau County Executive; 2022–present	Incumbent
