= Patricia Canzoneri-Fitzpatrick =

American politician

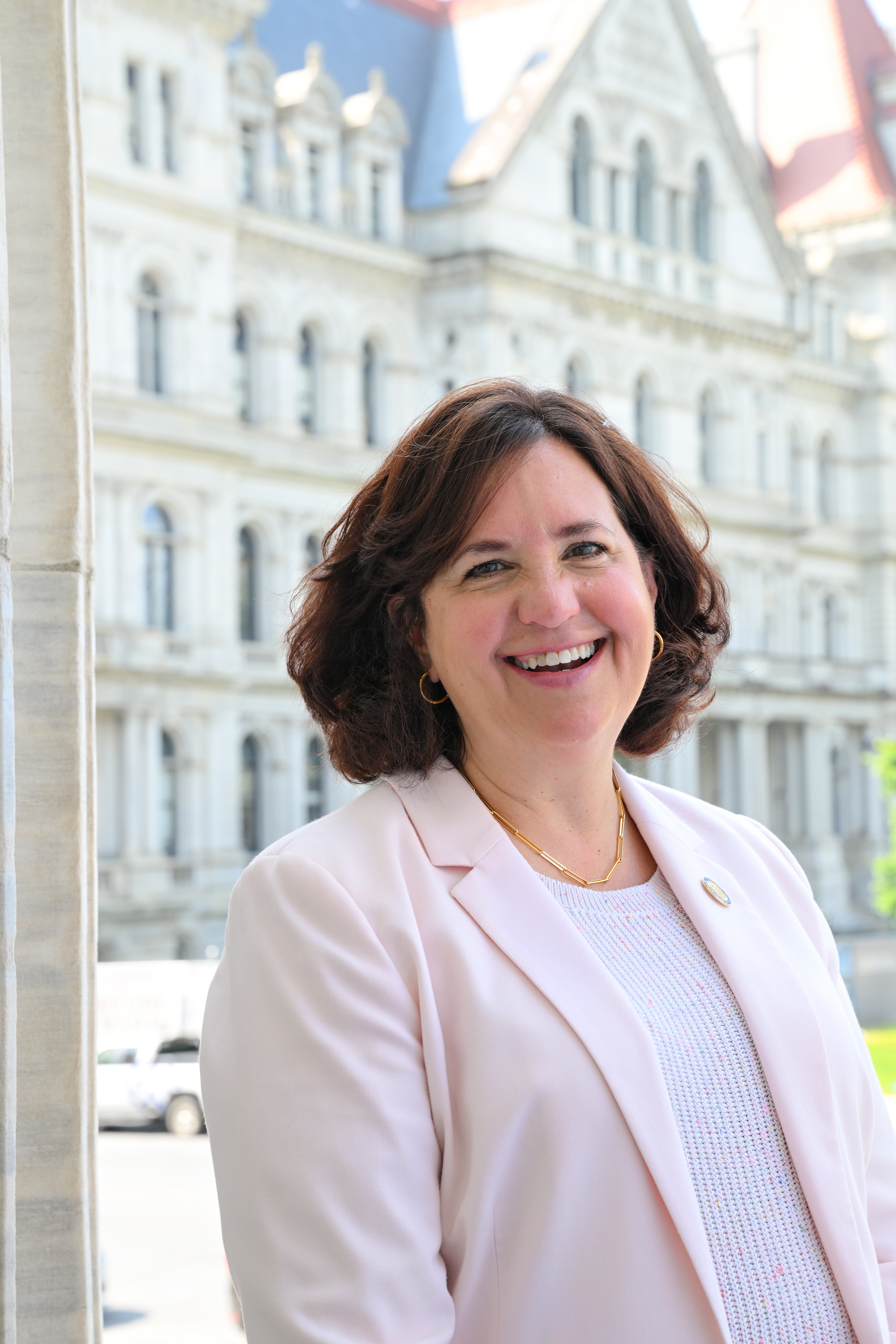
- Canzoneri-Fitzpatrick in 2024

Member of the New York State Senate from the 9th district
- Incumbent
- Assumed office January 1, 2023
- Preceded by: Todd Kaminsky

Personal details
- Born: 1964 or 1965 (age 60–61) Rockville Centre, New York, U.S.
- Party: Republican
- Education: St. John's University (BS, JD); New York University (LLM)
- Website: State Senate website Campaign website

Patricia Canzoneri-Fitzpatrick (born 1964/1965) is an American politician currently serving as a member of the New York State Senate for the 9th district since 2023. She was elected in 2022 as a member of the Republican Party.

Prior to being elected to the State Senate, Canzoneri-Fitzpatrick served as a trustee of the village of Malverne and was the village's police and fire commissioner. Canzoneri-Fitzpatrick is an attorney and small business owner, and a graduate of St. John's University School of Law and College of Business. She also earned a Master of Laws degree from New York University.

== Committee assignments ==
Canzoneri-Fitzpatrick currently serves as the ranking member on the Senate Committee on Consumer Protection and the Senate Committee on Mental Health. She also is a member of the committees on Environmental Conservation, Judiciary, and Women's Issues.

== Electoral history ==
=== 2022 ===
2022 New York State Senate election, District 9
Party	Candidate	Votes	%
Republican	Patricia Canzoneri-Fitzpatrick	58,217	
Conservative	Patricia Canzoneri-Fitzpatrick	4,919	
Total	Patricia Canzoneri-Fitzpatrick	63,136	53.8
Democratic	Kenneth Moore	47,885	
Working Families	Kenneth Moore	1,430	
Total	Kenneth Moore	49,315	42.1
Write-in		28	0.0
Total votes		112,479	100.0
Republican win (new boundaries)			

=== 2020 ===
2020 New York State Assembly election, District 21
Party	Candidate	Votes	%
Democratic	Judy Griffin	36,373	53.1
Republican	Patricia Canzoneri-Fitzpatrick	28,583	
Conservative	Patricia Canzoneri-Fitzpatrick	3,073	
Total	Patricia Canzoneri-Fitzpatrick	31,656	46.2
Libertarian	Barry Leon	487	0.7
Write-in		28	0.0
Total votes		68,544	100.0
Democratic hold			
