= South Hempstead, New York =

- Hamlet and census-designated place
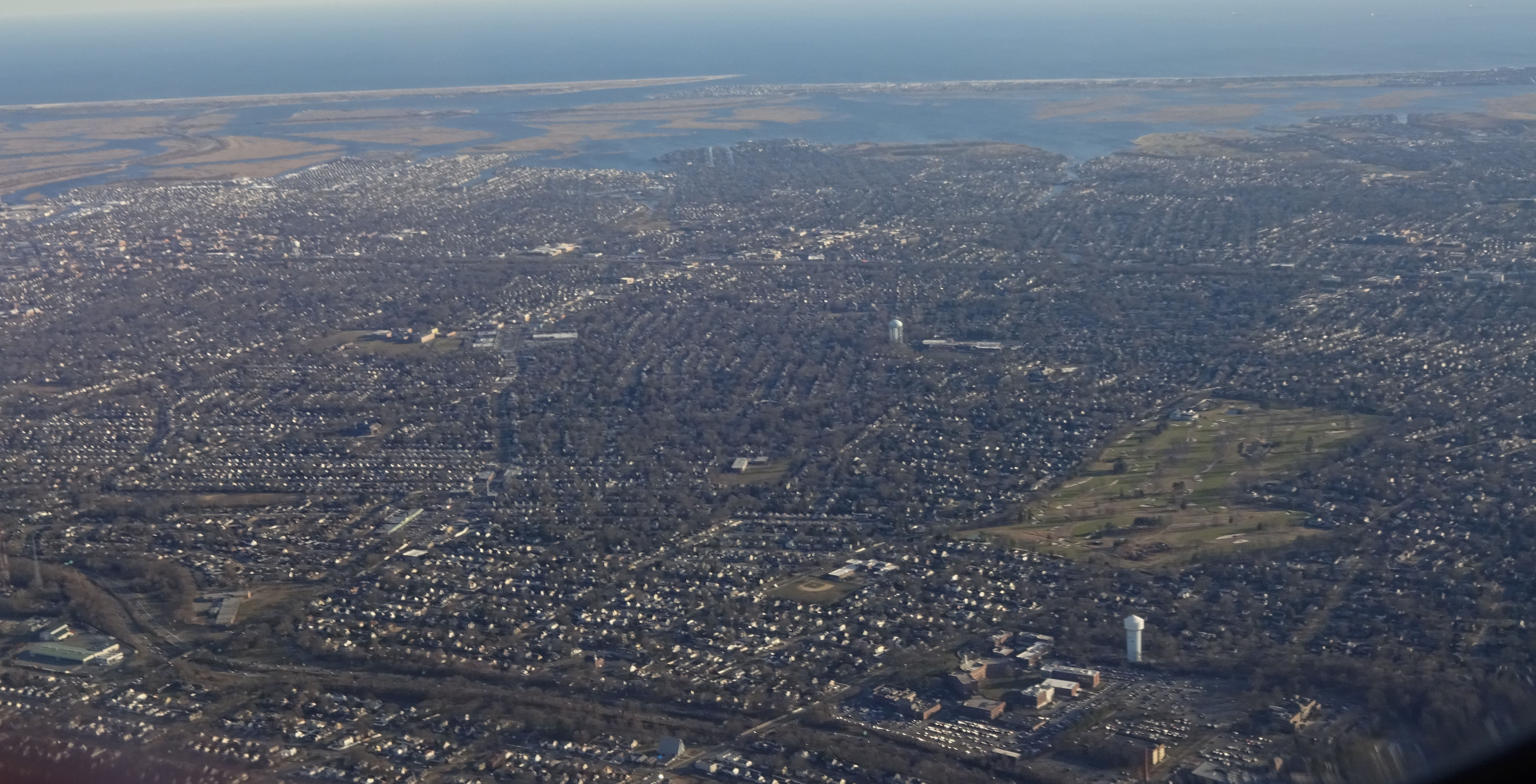
- South Hempstead and its vicinity, seen from the air in 2020

- Location in Nassau County and the state of New York

- Location on Long Island Location within the state of New York
- Coordinates: 40°41′00″N 73°37′15″W
- Country: United States
- State: New York
- County: Nassau
- Town: Hempstead
- Named after: Its location south of Hempstead

Area
  - Total: 0.58 sq mi (1.50 km^{2})
  - Land: 0.58 sq mi (1.50 km^{2})
  - Water: 0 sq mi (0.00 km^{2})
- Elevation: 43 ft (13 m)

Population (2020)
  - Total: 3,406
  - Density: 5,889.6/sq mi (2,273.98/km^{2})
- Time zone: UTC-5 (Eastern (EST))
  - Summer (DST): UTC-4 (EDT)
- ZIP Codes: 11550 (South Hempstead); 11570 (Rockville Centre)
- Area codes: 516, 363
- FIPS code: 36-69188
- GNIS feature ID: 0965769

South Hempstead is a hamlet and census-designated place (CDP) within the Town of Hempstead in Nassau County, on Long Island, in New York, United States. The population was 3,406 at the time of the 2020 census.

== History ==
South Hempstead's name reflects its geographic location south of the Village of Hempstead.

== Geography ==
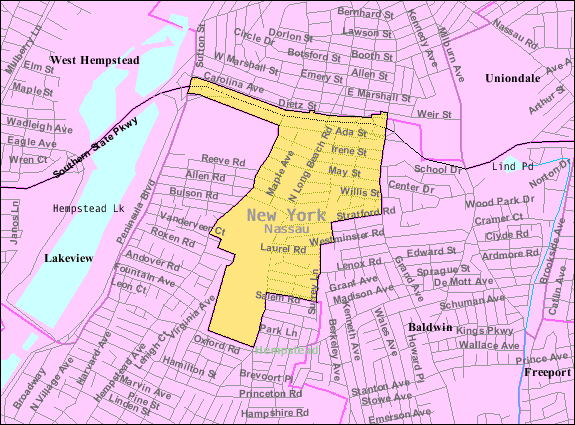
U.S. Census map of South Hempstead

According to the United States Census Bureau, the CDP has a total area of 0.6 square miles (1.6 km^{2}), all of it land.

== Demographics ==
Historical population
Census	Pop.	Note	%±
2000	3,188		—
2010	3,243		1.7%
2020	3,406		5.0%
U.S. Decennial Census

=== 2020 census ===
As of the 2020 census, South Hempstead had a population of 3,406. The median age was 39.5 years. 24.8% of residents were under the age of 18 and 15.0% of residents were 65 years of age or older. For every 100 females there were 97.6 males, and for every 100 females age 18 and over there were 94.2 males age 18 and over.

100.0% of residents lived in urban areas, while 0.0% lived in rural areas.

There were 1,029 households in South Hempstead, of which 43.1% had children under the age of 18 living in them. Of all households, 62.4% were married-couple households, 12.9% were households with a male householder and no spouse or partner present, and 21.4% were households with a female householder and no spouse or partner present. About 13.9% of all households were made up of individuals and 8.0% had someone living alone who was 65 years of age or older.

There were 1,074 housing units, of which 4.2% were vacant. The homeowner vacancy rate was 1.3% and the rental vacancy rate was 4.8%.

Racial composition as of the 2020 census
Race	Number	Percent
White	1,984	58.3%
Black or African American	534	15.7%
American Indian and Alaska Native	20	0.6%
Asian	79	2.3%
Native Hawaiian and Other Pacific Islander	2	0.1%
Some other race	401	11.8%
Two or more races	386	11.3%
Hispanic or Latino (of any race)	836	24.5%

=== 2000 census ===
As of the census of 2000, there were 3,188 people, 1,044 households, and 842 families residing in the CDP. The population density was 5,441.1 inhabitants per square mile (2,100.8/km^{2}). There were 1,075 housing units at an average density of 1,834.7 per square mile (708.4/km^{2}). The racial makeup of the CDP was 85.8% White, 5.1% African American, 0.1% Native American, 2.5% Asian, 3.5% from other races, and 2.0% from two or more races. Hispanic or Latino of any race were 5.5% of the population.

There were 1,044 households, out of which 39.9% had children under the age of 18 living with them, 65.8% were married couples living together, 11.6% had a female householder with no husband present, and 19.3% were non-families. 15.5% of all households were made up of individuals, and 8.0% had someone living alone who was 65 years of age or older. The average household size was 3.05 and the average family size was 3.40.

In the CDP, the population was spread out, with 27.1% under the age of 18, 6.5% from 18 to 24, 29.1% from 25 to 44, 24.1% from 45 to 64, and 13.2% who were 65 years of age or older. The median age was 38 years. For every 100 females, there were 93.6 males. For every 100 females age 18 and over, there were 90.3 males.

The median income for a household in the CDP was $85,130, and the median income for a family was $98,259. Males had a median income of $70,057 versus $55,599 for females. The per capita income for the CDP was $32,534. About 1.8% of families and 2.4% of the population were below the poverty line, including 0.7% of those under age 18 and 1.7% of those age 65 or over.

== See also ==
- West Hempstead, New York
- Hempstead (village), New York
