= Todd Kaminsky =

American politician

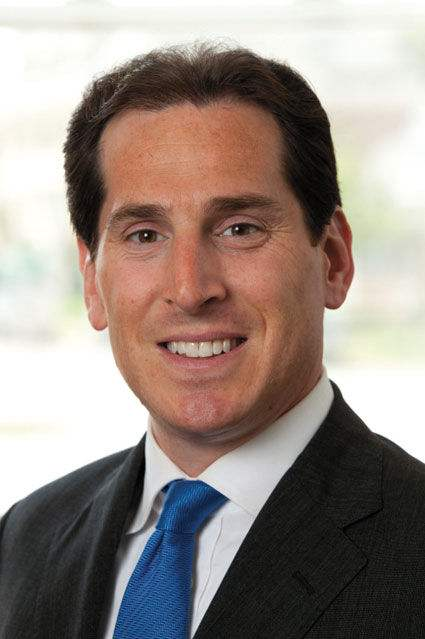

Member of the New York State Senate from the 9th district
- In office May 3, 2016 – July 29, 2022
- Preceded by: Dean Skelos
- Succeeded by: Patricia Canzoneri-Fitzpatrick

Member of the New York State Assembly from the 20th district
- In office January 1, 2015 – May 3, 2016
- Preceded by: Harvey Weisenberg
- Succeeded by: Melissa L. Miller

Personal details
- Born: October 24, 1978 (age 48) Lido Beach, New York, U.S.
- Party: Democratic
- Spouse: Ellen
- Children: 2
- Education: University of Michigan (AB); New York University (JD)
- Profession: Lawyer
- Website: Official website Campaign website

Todd Kaminsky is an American attorney, lobbyist, and former politician from the state of New York. A Democrat, he was a member of the New York State Senate representing the 9th district, which is based on the South Shore of Long Island. He was the Democratic nominee for Nassau County District Attorney in 2021 but lost the general election to Anne Donnelly by a landslide.

Kaminsky is the great-nephew of entertainer Mel Brooks.

== Early life and education ==
Kaminsky was born and raised in Long Beach, New York on Long Island. He received his A.B. degree, summa cum laude, from the University of Michigan, and his J.D. degree, magna cum laude, from New York University Law School.

== Legal career ==
Kaminsky worked as an assistant district attorney in the Queens County District Attorney's Office, prosecuting domestic violence cases, robberies, shootings and other violent crimes. He then joined the U.S. Attorney's Office in the Eastern District of New York as an Assistant United States Attorney, where he worked for six years. There he became acting deputy chief of the Public Integrity Section, successfully prosecuting elected officials including State Senate Majority Leader Pedro Espada Jr., Assemblyman Jimmy Meng, and U.S. Representative Michael Grimm.

Giving his closing remarks in the Espada, Jr. case, the New York Times wrote, "Pacing before the jury and cuing up slides on a computer presentation, Mr. Kaminsky often brought the jury and others in the courtroom to laughter, throwing out one-liners and making fun of Mr. Espada’s excuses for spending the money." Kaminsky also successfully prosecuted former music mogul and drug dealer James "Jimmy Henchman" Rosemond, securing an indictment after Rosemond was captured by DEA agents after remaining a fugitive for a month. For that prosecution, Kaminsky was awarded the True American Hero Award from the Federal Drug Agents Foundation.

As a community advocate, Kaminsky raised funds and held free legal clinics following Hurricane Sandy. For his efforts, he was awarded the Community Service Award from the U.S. Attorney's Office for the Eastern District of New York and the Long Beach Martin Luther King Center’s Sandy Relief Service Award.

== State Assembly ==
Kaminsky was elected to the New York State Assembly in November 2014, succeeding Harvey Weisenberg. As New York magazine noted in a profile, "The rookie assemblyman has already delivered some tangible results for his district — speeding up the state’s reimbursement schedule for Sandy housing reconstruction, and pushing to open a new emergency room to compensate slightly for the storm-induced closure of Long Beach Hospital."

In 2015, Kaminsky was named one of City & State's 40 Under 40 Rising Stars. In his first legislative session, he set a record for recent years for most bills passed by a first-year Assemblymember, and tied him at fourth overall in the Assembly this session with 18 of his bills passing the Assembly and 16 of those also passing the Senate.

== State Senate ==
Following the expulsion of Dean Skelos from the New York State Senate, the Democratic Party selected Kaminsky as their nominee for his seat in the special election in April 2016. On May 2, two weeks after the election took place, Kaminsky was officially declared the winner after defeating Republican challenger Chris McGrath by 886 votes. He was then sworn in the next day. Kaminsky and McGrath faced off again in the November 2016 general election—this time for a full term. Kaminsky won that election by 6,422 votes, or approximately 5% of the electorate.

He resigned unexpectedly in July 2022 to work for lobbying firm Greenberg Traurig.

=== Issues ===
==== Ethics reform ====
Kaminsky's experience as a former federal prosecutor led to him becoming a leader on ethics reform in New York State politics and at the forefront of decision-making around recent corruption scandals. As The Wall Street Journal wrote, "The confluence of federal prosecutors’ heightened interest in Albany and Mr. Kaminsky’s background has also vaulted him to prominence as Gov. Andrew Cuomo and the Legislature have grappled with whether and how to institute another package of ethics overhauls, which also happens to be the freshman lawmaker’s legislative priority." Kaminsky was appointed by Assembly Speaker Carl Heastie to a panel charged with finding an executive director for the Assembly's new ethics office. Kaminsky also played a role in helping put together the ethics reform package that was proposed in March by the Assembly and Governor Cuomo.

==== Hurricane Sandy ====
Kaminsky considers Hurricane Sandy one of the reasons for his decision to run for Assembly. Sandy hit the South Shore of Long Island particularly hard, destroying thousands of homes and other property. Like many residents in the area, Kaminsky was unsatisfied with the response from FEMA and NY Rising. Since being elected, Kaminsky has pushed for reforms to the NY Rising system, licensing for mold removal companies, and helped implement an information-sharing database in Nassau County to help better track abandoned properties. Kaminsky also introduced a bill passed by the Legislature that would require quarterly reporting on unpaid claims and unresolved Sandy-related cases. Another bill Kaminsky introduced, which would provide tax relief for victims of Hurricane Sandy who withdrew from retirement accounts to cover emergency payments, passed the Assembly.

Upon hearing that National Grid was going to reinstate fees for disconnecting and reconnecting gas lines – fees that had been eliminated after Sandy to provide some relief to homeowners affected – Kaminsky wrote a letter to National Grid on August 21 urging them to reverse the decision. On September 10, after weeks of talks, National Grid announced that it would continue its post-Sandy policy of not charging those fees, in a major victory for Sandy victims.

==== Long Beach Medical Center ====
Damage from Hurricane Sandy was so extensive that the Long Beach Medical Center had to be permanently closed. Kaminsky lead the push to call on South Nassau Community Hospital, the new owner, to reopen a full-service hospital in the former hospital's place. In early August, Kaminsky announced that New York State had given approval for a 24/7 freestanding emergency department to open. The emergency department opened on August 10, 2015.

== Personal life ==
Todd and his wife Ellen, married since 2010, live in Long Beach with their two children.

Kaminsky is the great-nephew of entertainer Mel Brooks. During Kaminsky's 2016 run for a seat in the New York State Senate the famed comedian recorded a robocall which was then employed by his nephew's campaign.
