= New York's 9th State Senate district =

American legislative district

Senator
Patricia Canzoneri-Fitzpatrick; R–Malverne
- Registration: 41.6% Democratic; 31.1% Republican; 22.3% No party preference
- Demographics: 61% White; 13% Black; 17% Hispanic; 6% Asian
- Population (2017): 321,334
- Registered voters: 247,731

New York's 9th State Senate district is one of 63 districts in the New York State Senate and has been represented by Patricia Canzoneri-Fitzpatrick since January 2023. Previously, it was represented by Democrat Todd Kaminsky until July 2022. He first won in an April 2016 special election to replace Republican Majority Leader Dean Skelos, who had been expelled from the body on corruption charges.

== Geography ==
District 9 is located almost entirely within the town of Hempstead in southwestern Nassau County on Long Island. It also includes the small city of Long Beach.

The district overlaps New York's 4th and 5th congressional districts, and with the 18th, 19th, 20th, 21st, and 22nd districts of the New York State Assembly.

== Recent election results ==
=== 2026 ===
2026 New York State Senate election, District 9
Party	Candidate	Votes	%
Republican	Patricia Canzoneri-Fitzpatrick		
Conservative	Patricia Canzoneri-Fitzpatrick		
Total	Patricia Canzoneri-Fitzpatrick (incumbent)		
Democratic	Lisa Vider		
Write-in			
Total votes			

=== 2024 ===
2024 New York State Senate election, District 9
Party	Candidate	Votes	%
Republican	Patricia Canzoneri-Fitzpatrick	77,628	
Conservative	Patricia Canzoneri-Fitzpatrick	6,270	
Total	Patricia Canzoneri-Fitzpatrick (incumbent)	83,898	54.3
Democratic	James Lynch	70,405	45.5
Write-in		334	0.2
Total votes		154,637	100.0
Republican hold			

=== 2022 ===
2022 New York State Senate election, District 9
Party	Candidate	Votes	%
Republican	Patricia Canzoneri-Fitzpatrick	58,217	
Conservative	Patricia Canzoneri-Fitzpatrick	4,919	
Total	Patricia Canzoneri-Fitzpatrick	63,136	56.1
Democratic	Kenneth Moore	47,885	
Working Families	Kenneth Moore	1,430	
Total	Kenneth Moore	49,315	43.8
Write-in		28	0.0
Total votes		112,479	100.0
Republican win (new boundaries)			

=== 2020 ===
2020 New York State Senate election, District 9
Party	Candidate	Votes	%
Democratic	Todd Kaminsky	92,414	
Independence	Todd Kaminsky	1,608	
Total	Todd Kaminsky (incumbent)	94,022	57.7
Republican	Victoria Johnson	63,043	
Conservative	Victoria Johnson	5,918	
Total	Victoria Johnson	68,961	42.3
Write-in		49	0.0
Total votes		163,032	100.0
Democratic hold			

=== 2018 ===
2018 New York State Senate election, District 9
Primary election
Party	Candidate	Votes	%
Reform	Todd Kaminsky (incumbent)	505	79.8
Reform	Francis Becker Jr.	114	18.0
Write-in		14	2.2
Total votes		633	100.0
General election
Democratic	Todd Kaminsky	70,538	
Working Families	Todd Kaminsky	1,110	
Independence	Todd Kaminsky	918	
Women's Equality	Todd Kaminsky	693	
Reform	Todd Kaminsky	153	
Total	Todd Kaminsky (incumbent)	73,412	61.8
Republican	Francis Becker Jr.	41,095	
Conservative	Francis Becker Jr.	4,044	
Tax Revolt Party	Francis Becker Jr.	278	
Total	Francis Becker Jr.	45,417	38.2
Write-in		32	0.0
Total votes		118,861	100.0
Democratic hold			

=== 2016 ===
2016 New York State Senate election, District 9
Primary election
Party	Candidate	Votes	%
Green	Laurence Hirsh	23	59.0
Green	Todd Kaminsky (incumbent)	16	41.0
Write-in		0	0.0
Total votes		39	100.0
General election
Democratic	Todd Kaminsky	72,723	
Working Families	Todd Kaminsky	2,091	
Women's Equality	Todd Kaminsky	925	
Total	Todd Kaminsky (incumbent)	75,739	51.7
Republican	Christopher McGrath	61,702	
Conservative	Christopher McGrath	5,659	
Independence	Christopher McGrath	1,257	
Tax Revolt Party	Christopher McGrath	336	
Reform	Christopher McGrath	263	
Total	Christopher McGrath	69,217	47.2
Green	Laurence Hirsh	1,565	1.1
Write-in		50	0.0
Total votes		146,571	100.0
Democratic hold			

=== 2016 special ===
2016 New York State Senate special election, District 9
Party	Candidate	Votes	%
Democratic	Todd Kaminsky	33,646	
Working Families	Todd Kaminsky	1,347	
Women's Equality	Todd Kaminsky	625	
Total	Todd Kaminsky	35,618	50.1
Republican	Christopher McGrath	29,924	
Conservative	Christopher McGrath	3,164	
Independence	Christopher McGrath	1,054	
Tax Revolt Party	Christopher McGrath	404	
Reform	Christopher McGrath	186	
Total	Christopher McGrath	34,732	48.8
Green	Laurence Hirsh	805	1.1
Write-in		56	0.1
Total votes		71,155	100.0
Democratic gain from Republican			

=== 2014 ===
2014 New York State Senate election, District 9
Party	Candidate	Votes	%
Republican	Dean Skelos	43,428	
Conservative	Dean Skelos	4,634	
Independence	Dean Skelos	1,960	
Tax Revolt Party	Dean Skelos	200	
Total	Dean Skelos (incumbent)	50,142	65.8
Democratic	Patrick Gillespie Jr.	23,969	
Working Families	Patrick Gillespie Jr.	2,057	
Total	Patrick Gillespie Jr.	26,026	34.2
Write-in		29	0.0
Total votes		76,197	100.0
Republican hold			

=== 2012 ===
2012 New York State Senate election, District 9
Party	Candidate	Votes	%
Republican	Dean Skelos	59,603	
Conservative	Dean Skelos	6,070	
Independence	Dean Skelos	2,675	
Tax Revolt Party	Dean Skelos	468	
Total	Dean Skelos (incumbent)	68,816	60.7
Democratic	Thomas Feffer	44,646	39.3
Write-in		29	0.0
Total votes		113,491	100.0
Republican hold			

=== Federal results in District 9 ===
Year	Office	Results
2020	President	Biden 54.7 – 44.0%
2016	President	Clinton 52.7 – 44.5%
2012	President	Obama 53.5 – 45.6%
2012	Senate	Gillibrand 64.4 – 34.7%
