= Dean Skelos =

American politician (born 1948)

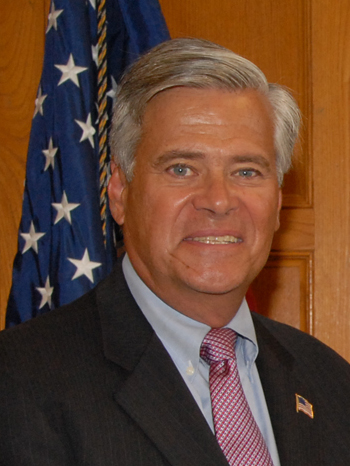
- Skelos in 2011

Temporary President and Majority Leader of the New York State Senate
- In office January 1, 2011 – May 11, 2015
- Preceded by: Pedro Espada Jr.
- Succeeded by: John J. Flanagan
- In office June 24, 2008 – December 31, 2008
- Preceded by: Joseph Bruno
- Succeeded by: Malcolm Smith

Acting Lieutenant Governor of New York
- In office June 24, 2008 – December 31, 2008
- Governor: David Paterson
- Preceded by: Joseph Bruno (acting)
- Succeeded by: Malcolm Smith (acting)

Member of the New York State Senate from the 9th district
- In office January 1, 1985 – December 11, 2015
- Preceded by: Carol Berman
- Succeeded by: Todd Kaminsky

Member of the New York State Assembly from the 19th district
- In office January 1, 1981 – December 31, 1982
- Preceded by: Raymond J. McGrath
- Succeeded by: Armand D'Amato

Personal details
- Born: Dean George Skelos; February 16, 1948 (age 78) Rockville Centre, New York, U.S.
- Party: Republican
- Spouse: Gail Skelos
- Children: 1
- Education: Washington College (BA); Fordham University (JD)

Dean George Skelos (/ˈskɛləs/ SKEL-əs; born February 16, 1948) is an American former politician and convicted felon from Long Island, New York.

A Republican, Skelos served in the New York State Assembly and later represented the 9th district in the New York State Senate from 1985 through 2015. He served as Senate Majority Leader in 2008 and again from 2011 to 2015.

Skelos forfeited his Senate seat when he was convicted on federal corruption charges in 2015. In 2017, his conviction was overturned following the U.S. Supreme Court decision in McDonnell v. United States. His retrial resulted in a second conviction on July 17, 2018. Skelos was sentenced to four years and three months in prison, and he began his prison term in January 2019. In April 2020, Skelos tested positive for COVID-19 and was released from prison to serve the remainder of his sentence under house arrest.

== Early life, education, and law career ==
Skelos was born on February 16, 1948, in Rockville Centre, New York, the oldest of four children. He is the grandson of a Greek immigrant. Skelos graduated from Washington College in Maryland with a B.A. in history in 1970 and earned a J.D. from Fordham University School of Law in 1975.

Skelos was of counsel to Ruskin Moscou Faltischek, P.C., from 1994 through 2015. Skelos was automatically disbarred in 2016 following a felony conviction.

== Political career ==
=== New York State Assembly ===
Skelos was elected to the New York State Assembly in 1980.

=== New York State Senate ===
After one Assembly term, Skelos ran for State Senate in 1982, challenging incumbent Democratic-Liberal New York State Senator Carol Berman. The reapportionment earlier that year changed the boundaries of the 9th Senate district, which previously included parts of Nassau and Queens County. The new district, drawn by Senate Republicans, was entirely within Nassau County and favored Republicans. Skelos was endorsed by the Republican and Conservative parties. Berman, running on the Democratic Party and Liberal Party lines, won the race by 6,108 votes (55,504 to 49,396). Matthew Doyle, the Right-to-Life Party candidate, received 2,520 votes in the three-way race.

In 1984, Skelos challenged Berman in a rematch. This time, Skelos, who had President Ronald Reagan visit the district and campaign for him, narrowly defeated Berman in a two-way race, winning by 50.7% to 49.3% (67,834 to 65,875 votes). Skelos represented Senate District Nine from 1985 to 2015.

In 1986, Berman challenged Skelos in their third consecutive state senate contest. Skelos, running on the Republican and Conservative Party lines, defeated Berman, the Democratic and Liberal parties' candidate, in a three-way race, winning 53% of the vote (49,761) to 43.7% (41,005). Right-to-Life party candidate Joan McDermott received 3.2% (2,967) of the vote.

From 1995 to 2008, Skelos was Deputy Majority Leader of the New York State Senate. In 2008, he became the Majority Leader of the New York State Senate after Joseph Bruno stepped down from that post.

On June 24, 2011, Skelos voted against allowing same-sex marriage in New York during a senate roll-call vote on the Marriage Equality Act, which narrowly passed the Senate in a 33–29 vote. In a statement made prior to the vote, he said: "This is a very difficult issue and it will be a vote of conscience for every member of the Senate."

In 2013, as Senate Majority Leader, Skelos was responsible for suspending Senate rules and bringing the NY SAFE Act (a firearm-related bill) to the Senate floor. He voted for the SAFE Act and advocated its passage.

On May 4, 2015, Skelos was arrested on federal corruption charges. On May 11, he stepped down from his position as Senate Majority Leader. Skelos was convicted on December 11, 2015; he was automatically expelled from the Senate due to his conviction.

== Federal prosecution and conviction ==
Skelos and his son, Adam Skelos, were arrested and charged with six counts of corruption by U.S. Attorney Preet Bharara on May 4, 2015. The criminal complaint included extortion, fraud, and bribe solicitation charges. Skelos was accused of taking official actions to benefit a small Arizona environmental company, AbTech Industries, and a large New York developer, Glenwood Management, that had financial ties to AbTech. According to the complaint, Senator Skelos agreed to do so as long as the companies paid his son.

On May 28, 2015, Skelos and his son were indicted by a federal grand jury on six counts of bribery, extortion, wire fraud, and conspiracy.

After his arrest, Skelos asserted that he and his son were innocent. He stepped down from his majority leader post in the Senate on May 11, 2015; he had already begun a leave of absence from the law firm of Ruskin Moscou Faltischek. "The criminal complaint against him said he had earned $2.6 million there since 1994, despite apparently doing no actual legal work; he was paid instead for referring clients, some of whom had business before the state."

In July 2015, in an expanded indictment, federal prosecutors added two new charges of soliciting bribes from a Long Island company in return for favorable legislation. The new indictment charged that Skelos procured a position for his son at a medical malpractice insurance company with business before the state, that Adam Skelos was not qualified for the position, that Adam Skelos threatened his supervisor, and that Adam Skelos asserted that "he didn't need to show up to work because his father was the Majority Leader of the State Senate".

On December 11, 2015, a unanimous jury convicted Dean and Adam Skelos of all eight counts of bribery, extortion, and corruption. Dean Skelos was convicted of using his position in the Senate to benefit three companies—a real estate developer, an environmental technology company, and a medical malpractice insurer—in exchange for the companies' agreement to give work to his son. Prosecutors said that the three businesses provided Adam Skelos with about $300,000 and other benefits. The trial verdict automatically terminated Dean Skelos from the state legislature. On May 12, 2016, U.S. District Judge Kimba Wood sentenced Dean Skelos to five years in prison, and Adam Skelos to six-and-a-half years in prison. Wood allowed both to remain free on bail pending appeals based on the U.S. Supreme Court's decision in McDonnell v. United States, in which the court reversed the corruption conviction of a former Virginia Governor.

On September 26, 2017, the U.S. Court of Appeals for the Second Circuit vacated the convictions of the Skeloses and ordered a retrial, arguing that the district judge had given the jury improper instructions. However the panel wrote that the government's evidence appeared to be sufficient to allow a properly instructed jury to convict the Skeloses, as there was enough evidence to establish that there had been a quid pro quo arrangement in each of the schemes at issue. The retrial of Skelos and his son began on June 19, 2018. During the retrial, in contrast to the first trial, Skelos took the witness stand and testified in his own defense. On July 17, 2018, Skelos and his son were found guilty of eight felonies.

On October 23, 2018, Skelos was sentenced to four years and three months in federal prison. Judge Wood suggested that he had been unrepentant and that parts of his testimony were outright false. Adam Skelos was sentenced to a four-year prison term. Dean Skelos reported to the Federal Correctional Institute in Otisville, Orange County, New York, to begin his prison term on January 8, 2019. Under New York State law, Skelos continued to draw his annual pension of nearly $100,000 while in prison.

Skelos tested positive for COVID-19 in April 2020 and was released from prison to serve the remainder of his sentence under house arrest.

New York State Assembly
Preceded by Raymond J. McGrath	Member of the New York State Assembly from the 19th district 1981–1983	Succeeded by Armand D'Amato
New York State Senate
Preceded by Carol Berman	Member of the New York State Senate from the 9th district 1985–2015	Succeeded by Todd Kaminsky
Political offices
Preceded by Joseph Bruno	Majority Leader of the New York State Senate; 2008	Succeeded by Malcolm Smith
Preceded by Pedro Espada Jr.	Majority Leader of the New York State Senate; 2011–2015	Succeeded by John J. Flanagan
Preceded by Joseph Bruno; Acting	Lieutenant Governor of New York; Acting; 2008	Succeeded by Malcolm Smith; Acting
