= Malverne High School =

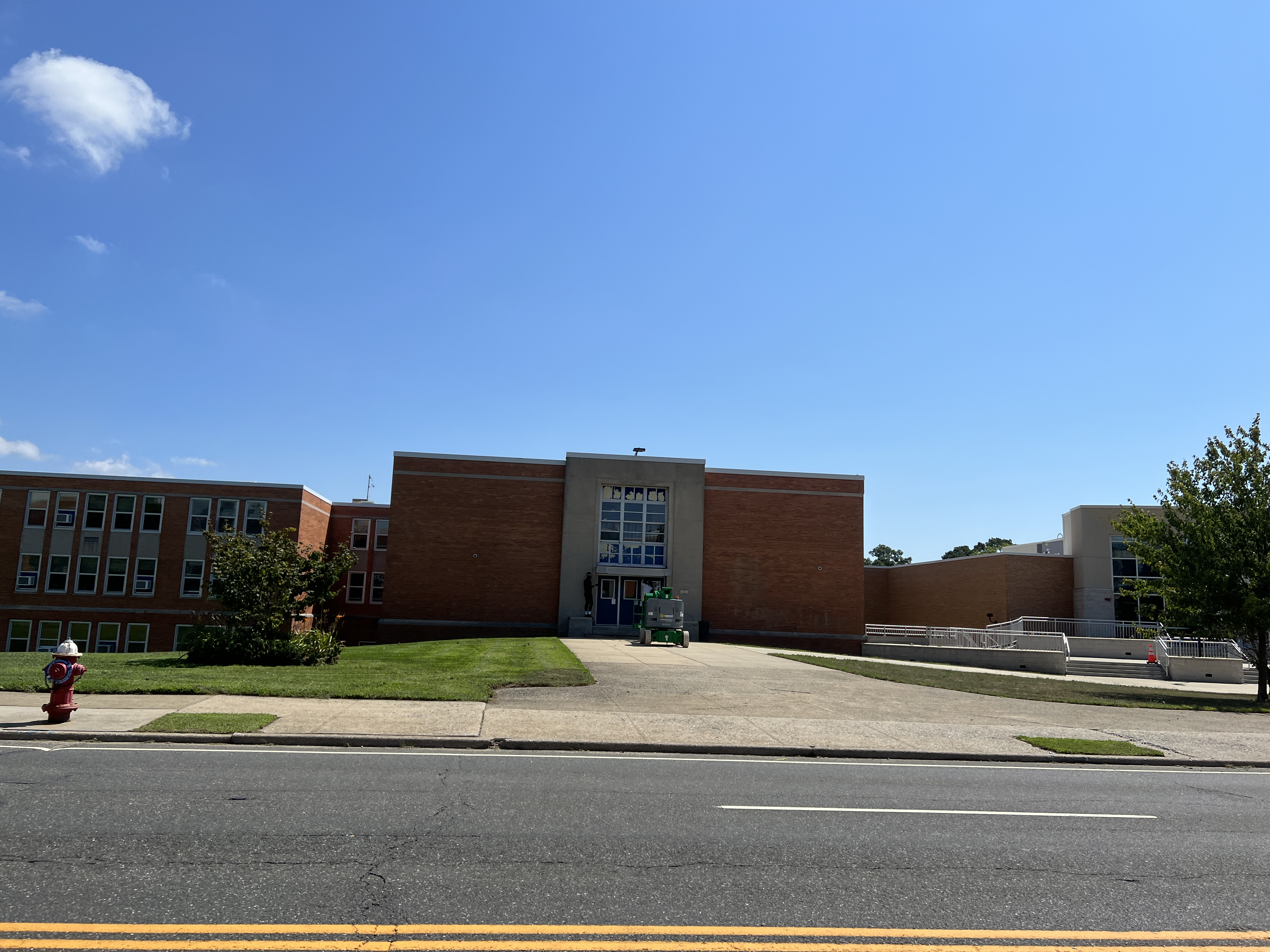
- The front of Malverne High School in 2022.

Location
- 80 Ocean Avenue; Malverne, New York 11565; United States; 40°40′11.5″N 73°39′40″W

Information
- Type: Public
- Established: 1958
- School district: Malverne Union Free School District
- Principal: Kesha Bascombe
- Grades: 9–12
- Website: malverneschools.org/schools/malverne_senior_high_school

Malverne High School (also known as Malverne Senior High School) is a public high school in Malverne, in Nassau County, on Long Island, in New York, United States. It is the Malverne Union Free School District's sole high school.

== Description ==
The current Malverne High school was constructed in 1958. It was designed by Valley Stream-based Frederic P. Wiedersum Associates. The school is one of four operated by the Malverne School District.

The high school (and the district itself) made national news in the 1960s, due to racial tensions and its refusal to become racially integrated – despite that Brown v. Board of Education had been ruled upon place a decade prior, ruling on the federal level that public schools must integrate. Racial tensions continued at the school for years after it became integrated.

As of 2024, the principal is Kesha Bascombe.

== Notable alumni ==
- Thomas Gulotta – Politician who was the county executive of Nassau County from 1987 to 2001.
- Norman F. Lent – Lawyer and politician who served in the United States House of Representatives.
- Francis T. Purcell – Baseball player and politician who served as county executive of Nassau County from 1978 to 1987.
- Frank Springer – Comics artist.

== See also ==
- Lynbrook Senior High School
- School integration in the United States
