= Thomas Gulotta =

American politician (1944–2019)

6th County Executive of Nassau County
- In office January 16, 1987 – December 31, 2001
- Preceded by: Francis T. Purcell
- Succeeded by: Tom Suozzi

Presiding Supervisor of Hempstead
- In office 1981–1987
- Preceded by: Al D'Amato
- Succeeded by: Joseph Mondello

Member of the New York State Assembly from the 13th district
- In office 1977–1981
- Preceded by: Milton Jonas
- Succeeded by: Guy Mazza

Personal details
- Born: Thomas Stephen Gulotta; April 27, 1944 Oceanside, New York, U.S.
- Died: August 4, 2019 (aged 75) Oceanside, New York, U.S.
- Party: Republican
- Spouse: Betsy Gulotta
- Education: Trinity College (BA); Columbia University (JD)
- Profession: lawyer

Thomas Stephen Gulotta (April 27, 1944 – August 4, 2019) was an American Republican politician from Nassau County, New York, who was the county executive of Nassau from 1987 to 2001.

== Early life ==
Gulotta was born in Oceanside, New York, on April 27, 1944, the son of Josephine and Frank Gulotta Sr. His father was a former Nassau County district attorney and former New York State Supreme Court judge. The younger Gulotta was raised on Long Island and attended Malverne High School, where he was student president. He graduated from Trinity College, and earned a Juris Doctor degree from Columbia Law School in 1969.

== Career ==
Gulotta was a member of the New York State Assembly from 1977 to 1981, sitting in the 182nd, 183rd and 184th New York state legislatures. He represented a district that included his hometown of Merrick, New York, until 1981 when he was selected to become the presiding supervisor of the town of Hempstead, succeeding Al D'Amato, who had been elected to the United States Senate. He was re-elected to the position in 1983.

On January 16, 1987, Gulotta was appointed county executive by the county's board of supervisors, and was elected to a full term in November 1987. He opted not to run for a fifth term in 2001, after having won 11 straight elections. His successor was Democrat Tom Suozzi.

Gulotta later founded Executive Strategies, a consulting firm, and joined the law firm of Shaw, Licitra, Bohner, Eserino, Schwartz & Pfluger in Mineola, New York, and was named a partner of the firm in 2004. At the time of his death in 2019 Gulotta was a special counsel at Albanese & Albanese, LLP, a law firm in Garden City, New York.

== Personal life ==
Gulotta married Elizabeth Abbott Fryatt; they had two living children.

Gulotta died on August 4, 2019, at the age of 75.

Political offices
Preceded by Milton Jonas	New York State Assembly; 13th district 1977–1981	Succeeded by Guy Mazza
Preceded by Francis T. Purcell	County Executive of Nassau County, New York; 1987–2001	Succeeded by Tom Suozzi
