= Ralph G. Caso =

American politician (1917–1998)

Ralph George Caso (November 26, 1917 – August 31, 1998) was an American politician from New York.

== Life ==
Caso graduated from New York University School of Law and served in World War II. After the war, he practiced law in Merrick, New York. He was a supervisor of the town of Hempstead from 1961 to 1965, and presiding supervisor from 1965 to 1970. Caso also served as county executive in Nassau County from 1970 to 1978.

In 1974, Caso ran for Lieutenant Governor of New York as the running mate of Malcolm Wilson, but the Wilson-Caso ticket was defeated by Democratic Congressman Hugh Carey of Brooklyn and his running mate, State Senator Mary Anne Krupsak of Amsterdam.

Caso died, age 80, of pneumonia at the South Nassau Communities Hospital in Oceanside, Nassau County, New York.

== Sources ==
- Ralph G. Caso, 80, Is Dead; Led Nassau County in 1970's in NYT on September 2, 1998

Political offices
Preceded by Eugene Nickerson	County Executive of Nassau County, New York; 1971–1978	Succeeded by Francis T. Purcell
Party political offices
Preceded by Malcolm Wilson	Republican Party Nominee for Lieutenant Governor of New York; 1974	Succeeded by Bruce F. Caputo
Preceded by Edward F. Leonard	Conservative nominee for Lieutenant Governor of New York; 1974	Succeeded by Bruce F. Caputo
