= Nassau County, New York =

County in New York, United States

- County
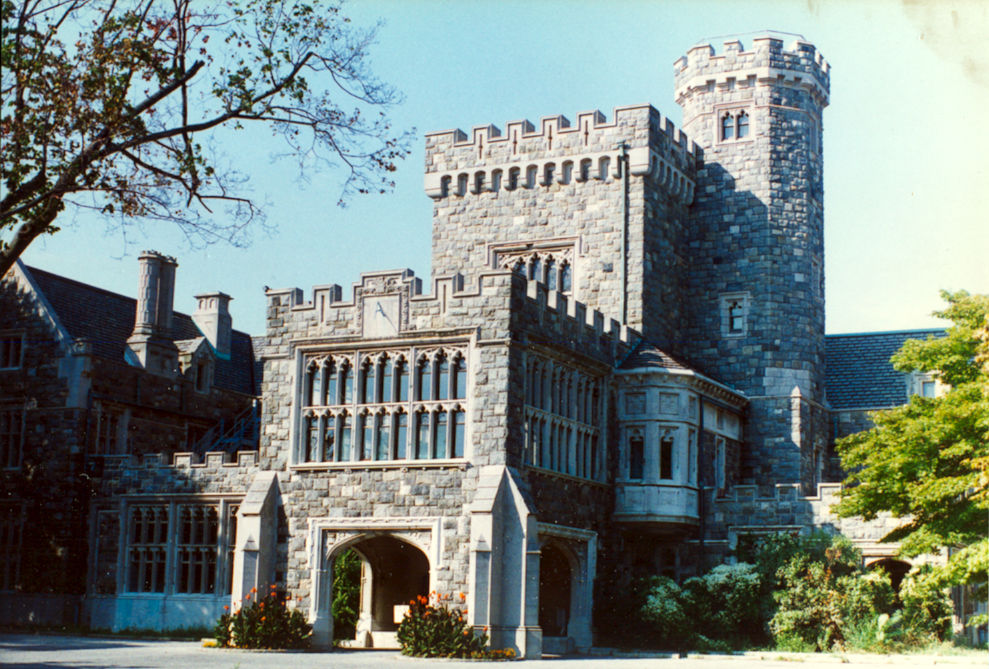
- Hempstead House, part of Sands Point Preserve, on Nassau County's Gold Coast, home to some of the world's most expensive real estate

- Flag Seal
- Nickname: The safest county in America
- Location within the U.S. state of New York
- Coordinates: 40°44′50″N 73°38′17″W
- Country: United States
- State: New York
- Founded: 1899
- Named for: House of Nassau
- Seat: Mineola
- Largest town: Hempstead

Government
  - Body: Nassau County Legislature
  - Executive: Bruce Blakeman (R)

Area
  - Total: 453 sq mi (1,170 km^{2})
  - Land: 285 sq mi (740 km^{2})
  - Water: 169 sq mi (440 km^{2}) 37%

Population (2020)
  - Total: 1,395,774
  - Estimate (2025): 1,398,939 ▲
  - Density: 4,900/sq mi (1,890/km^{2})

GDP
  - Total: US$130.222 billion (2024)
  - Per capita: US$93,163 (2024)
- Time zone: UTC−5 (Eastern)
  - Summer (DST): UTC−4 (EDT)
- Area code: 516, 363
- Congressional districts: 2nd, 3rd, 4th
- Website: nassaucountyny.gov
- Population is 2020 official census

Interactive map of Nassau County, New York

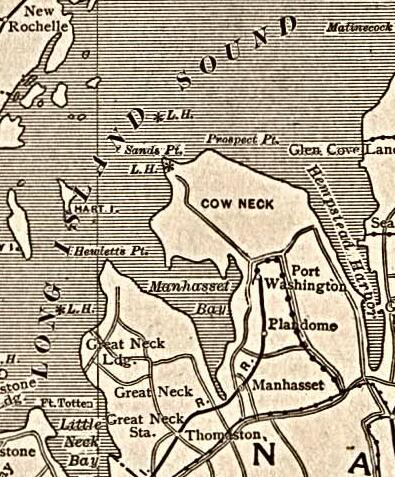
Manhasset Bay, as seen on a map from 1917

Nassau County (/ˈnæsɔː/ NASS-aw) is a densely populated and affluent suburban county located on Long Island, immediately to the east of New York City, bordering the Long Island Sound on the north and the open Atlantic Ocean to the south. As of the 2020 United States census, Nassau County's population was 1,395,774, making it the sixth-most populous county in the State of New York and 29th in the nation, reflecting an increase of 56,242 (+4.2%) from the 1,339,532 residents enumerated at the 2010 census. By 2025, Nassau's population was approaching 1.4 million, driven by a high influx of Asians from New York City. The county seat is Mineola, while Nassau County's largest and most populous town is Hempstead.

Situated on western Long Island, the county borders New York City's borough of Queens to its west, and Long Island's Suffolk County to its east. It is the most densely populated and second-most populous county in the State of New York outside of New York City, with which it maintains extensive rail, highway, and cultural connectivity. Nassau is considered one of the central counties within the New York metropolitan area.

The county comprises two cities, three towns, 64 incorporated villages, and more than 60 unincorporated hamlets. Nassau County has a designated police department, fire commission, and elected executive and legislative bodies.

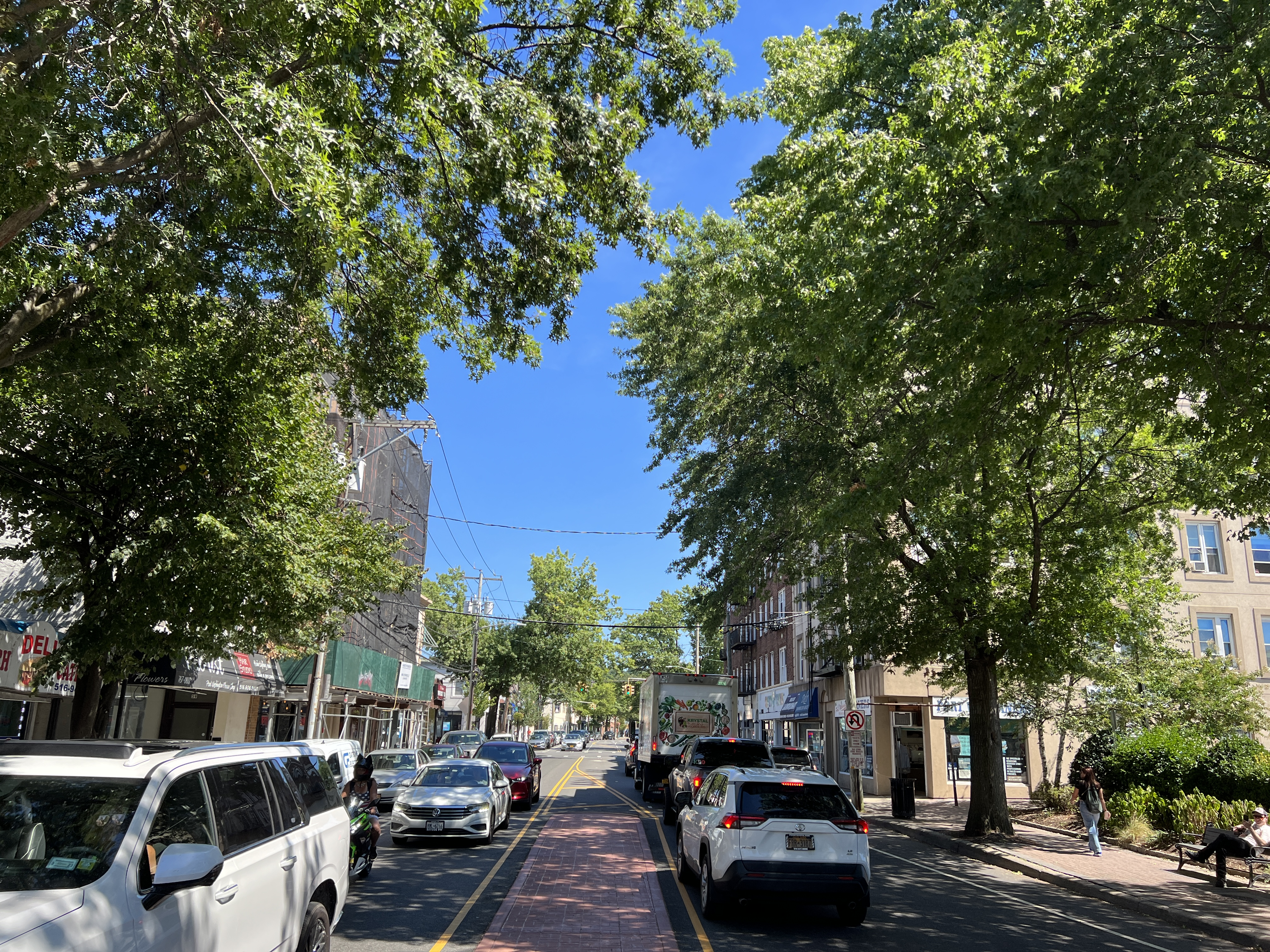
Main Street, Port Washington

A 2012 Forbes article based on the American Community Survey reported Nassau County as the most expensive county and one of the highest-income counties in the U.S., and the most affluent in New York state, with four of the nation's top ten towns by median household income located in the county. Housing costs and a lack of new housing supply to meet the exceptional demand have become a pressing concern for Nassau County. As of 2026, the median home price overall in Nassau is over US$900,000, while the Gold Coast (North Shore) of Nassau County features some of the world's most expensive real estate. Nassau has been ranked the safest county in the United States.

Nassau County high school students often feature prominently as winners of the International Science and Engineering Fair and similar STEM-based academic awards as well as top AI programs and U.S. schools lists. Cold Spring Harbor Laboratory in the Town of Oyster Bay; the Old Westbury campus of New York Institute of Technology; the second campus of the New York University Grossman School of Medicine in Mineola, Zucker School of Medicine in the Village of Hempstead; and the Feinstein Institutes for Medical Research in Manhasset, are prominent life sciences research and academic institutions in Nassau County. The presence of numerous prominent health care systems has made Nassau County a central hub for advanced medical care and technology. Eight cricket matches of the 2024 ICC Men's T20 World Cup were played at a temporary cricket stadium in Eisenhower Park in East Meadow in June 2024.

== Etymology ==
The name of Nassau County originated from an old name for Long Island, which was at one time named Nassau, after the Dutch family of King William III of England, the House of Nassau, itself named after the German town of Nassau. The county colors (orange and blue) are also the colors of the House of Orange-Nassau.

Several alternate names had been considered for Nassau County, including "Bryant", "Matinecock" (a village within the county currently has that name), "Norfolk" (presumably because of its proximity to Suffolk County), and "Sagamore". However, "Nassau" had the historical advantage of having at one time been the name of Long Island itself, and was the name most mentioned after the new county was proposed in 1875.

== History ==
The area now designated as Nassau County originally constituted the eastern 70% of Queens County, one of the original twelve counties of New York State formed in 1683, and was then contained within two towns: Hempstead, and Oyster Bay. In 1784, the Town of North Hempstead was formed through secession by the northern portions of the Town of Hempstead. Nassau County was formed in 1899 by the division of Queens County, after the western portion of Queens had become a borough of New York City in 1898, as the three easternmost towns seceded from the county.

When the first European settlers arrived, among the Native Americans to occupy the present area of Nassau County were the Marsapeque, Matinecoc, and Sacatogue. Dutch settlers in New Netherland predominated in the western portion of Long Island, while English settlers from Connecticut occupied the eastern portion. Until 1664, Long Island was split, roughly at the present border of Nassau and Suffolk counties, with the Dutch establishing ownership of what would become Nassau County, and Connecticut claiming the future Suffolk County territory. The Dutch did grant an English settlement in Hempstead (now in western Nassau), but drove settlers from the present-day eastern Nassau hamlet of Oyster Bay as part of a boundary dispute. In 1664, all of Long Island became part of the English Province of New York within the Shire of York. Present-day Queens and Nassau were then just part of a larger North Riding. In 1683, the colonial territory of Yorkshire was dissolved, Suffolk County and Queens County were established, and the local seat of government was moved west from Hempstead to Jamaica (now in New York City).

By 1700, virtually none of Long Island's area remained unpurchased from the Native Americans by the English colonists, and townships controlled whatever land had not already been distributed. The courthouse in Jamaica was torn down by the British during the American Revolution to use the materials to build barracks.

In 1784, following the American Revolutionary War, the Town of Hempstead was split in two, when Patriots in the northern part formed the new Town of North Hempstead, leaving Loyalist majorities in the Town of Hempstead. Around 1787, a new Queens County Courthouse was erected (and later completed) in the new Town of North Hempstead, near present-day Mineola (now in Nassau County), known then as Clowesville. (Note: The former county courthouse was located northeast of the intersection of Jericho Turnpike (NY Route 25) and the aptly named County Courthouse Road in an unincorporated area of the Town of North Hempstead, variously referred to in the present day as Garden City Park or New Hyde Park. The site is now a shopping center anchored by a supermarket and is located in the New Hyde Park 11040 ZIP Code. A stone marker located on the north side of Jericho Turnpike (NY Route 25), between Marcus Avenue and Herricks Road, identifies the site.)

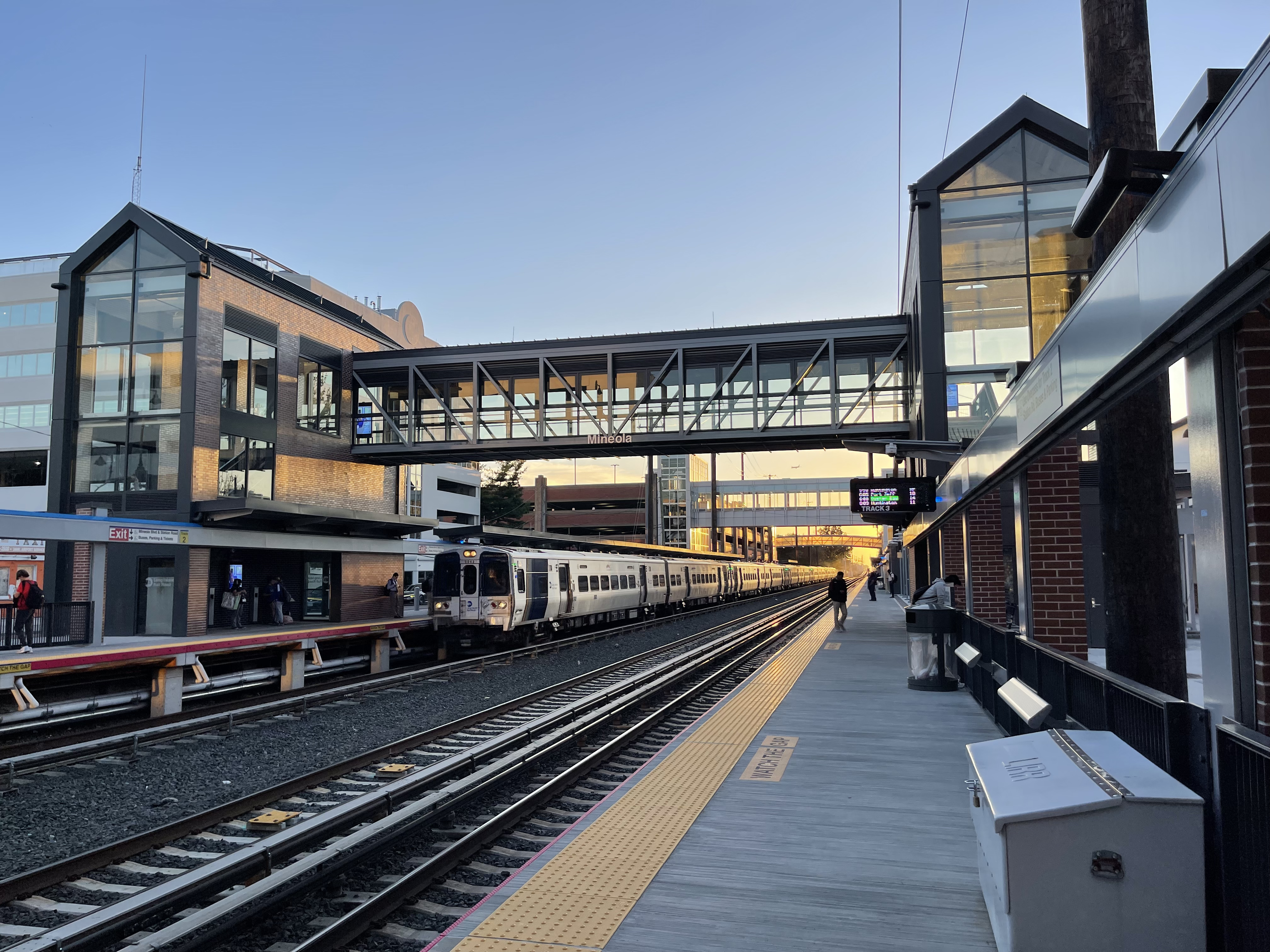
Mineola Station of the Long Island Rail Road

The Long Island Rail Road reached as far east as Hicksville in 1837, but did not proceed to Farmingdale until 1841 due to the Panic of 1837. The 1850 census was the first in which the combined population of the three western towns (Flushing, Jamaica, and Newtown) exceeded that of the three eastern towns that are now part of Nassau County. Concerns were raised about the condition of the old courthouse and the inconvenience of travel and accommodations, with the three eastern and three western towns divided on the location for the construction of a new one. Around 1874, the seat of county government was moved to Long Island City from Mineola. As early as 1875, representatives of the three eastern towns began advocating the separation of the three eastern towns from Queens, with some proposals also including the towns of Huntington and Babylon (in Suffolk County).

In 1898, the western portion of Queens County became a borough of the consolidated City of Greater New York, leaving the eastern portion a part of Queens County but not part of the Borough of Queens. As part of the city consolidation plan, all town, village, and city (other than NYC) governments within the borough were dissolved, as well as the county government with its seat in Jamaica. The areas excluded from the consolidation included all of the Town of North Hempstead, all of the Town of Oyster Bay, and most of the Town of Hempstead (excluding the Rockaway Peninsula, which was separated from the Town of Hempstead and became part of the city borough).

In 1899, following approval from the New York State Legislature, the three towns were separated from Queens County, and the new county of Nassau was formed.

In preparation for the new county in November 1898, voters had selected Mineola to become the county seat for the new county (before Mineola incorporated as a village in 1906 and set its boundaries almost entirely within the Town of North Hempstead), winning out over Hicksville and Hempstead.

The Garden City Company (founded in 1893 by the heirs of Alexander Turney Stewart) donated four acres of land for the county buildings in the Town of Hempstead, just south of the Mineola train station and the present day village of Mineola. The land and the buildings have a Mineola postal address, but are within the present day Village of Garden City, which did not incorporate, nor set its boundaries, until 1919.

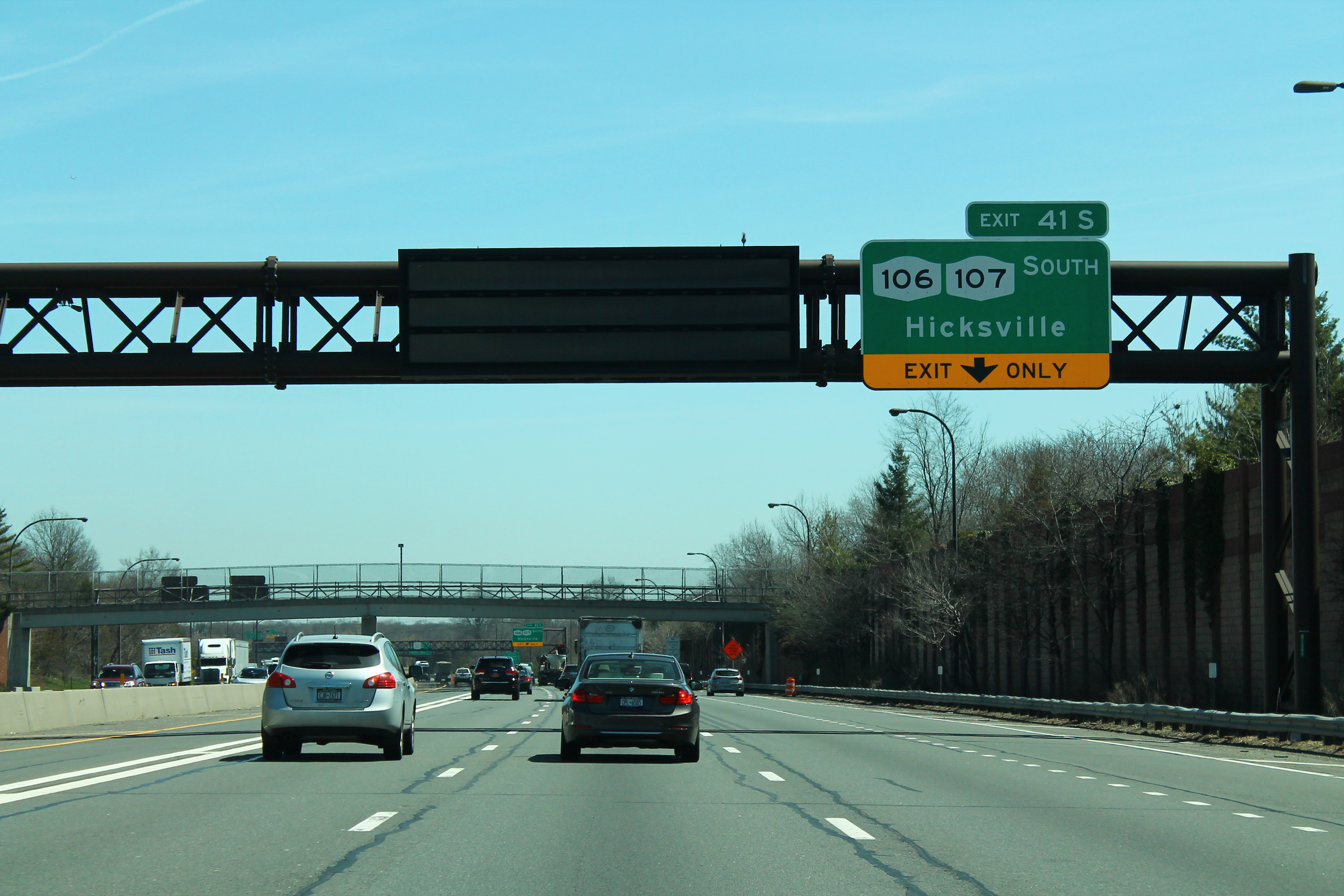
Long Island Expressway at Hicksville, New York, home to a growing Little India

In 1917, the hamlet of Glen Cove was granted a city charter, making it independent from the Town of Oyster Bay. In 1918, the village of Long Beach was incorporated in the Town of Hempstead. In 1922, it became a city, making it independent of the town. These are the only two administrative divisions in Nassau County identified as cities.

From the early 1900s until the Depression and the early 1930s, many hilly farmlands on the North Shore were transformed into luxurious country estates for wealthy New Yorkers, with the area receiving the "Gold Coast" moniker and becoming the setting of F. Scott Fitzgerald's 1925 novel The Great Gatsby. One summer resident of the Gold Coast was President Theodore Roosevelt, at Sagamore Hill. In 1908, William Kissam Vanderbilt constructed the Long Island Motor Parkway as a toll road through Nassau County. With overpasses and bridges to remove intersections, it was among the first limited access motor highways in the world, and was also used as a racecourse to test the capabilities of the fledgling automobile industry.

Nassau County, with its extensive flat land, was the site of many aviation firsts. Military aviators for both World Wars were trained on the Hempstead Plains at installations such as Mitchel Air Force Base, and a number of successful aircraft companies were established. Charles Lindbergh took off for Paris from Roosevelt Field in 1927, completing the first non-stop trans-Atlantic flight from the United States. Grumman (which in 1986 employed 23,000 people on Long Island) built many planes for World War II, and later contributed the Apollo Lunar Module to the Space program.

The United Nations Security Council was temporarily located in Nassau County, from 1946 till 1951. Council meetings were held at the Sperry Gyroscope headquarters in the village of Lake Success, near the border with Queens County. It was here that on June 27, 1950, the Security Council voted to back U.S. President Harry S Truman and send a coalition of forces to the Korean Peninsula, leading to the Korean War.

Until World War II, most of Nassau County was still farmland, particularly in the eastern portion. Following the war, the county saw an influx of people from the five boroughs of New York City, especially from Brooklyn and Queens, who left their urban dwellings for a more suburban setting. This led to a massive population boom in the county. In 1947, William Levitt built his first planned community in Nassau County, in the Island Trees section (later renamed Levittown; this should not be confused with the county's first planned community, which in general is Garden City). In the 1930s, Robert Moses had engineered curving parkways and parks such as Jones Beach State Park and Bethpage State Park for the enjoyment of city-dwellers; in the 1950s and 1960s the focus turned to alleviating commuter traffic.

In 1994, Federal Judge Arthur Spatt declared the Nassau County Board of Supervisors unconstitutional and directed that a 19-member legislature be formed. Republicans won 13 seats in the election and chose Bruce Blakeman as the first Presiding Officer (Speaker).

According to a Forbes magazine 2012 survey, residents of Nassau County have the 12th highest median household annual income in the country and the highest in the state. In the 1990s, however, Nassau County experienced substantial budget problems, forcing the county to near bankruptcy. Thus, the county government increased taxes to prevent a takeover by the state of New York, leading to the county having high property taxes. Nevertheless, on January 27, 2011, a State of New York oversight board seized control of Nassau County's finances, saying the wealthy and heavily taxed county had failed to balance its $2.6 billion budgets.

In 2024, Blakeman, in his role as county executive, began recruiting for a new armed force separate from the county's police force, saying the new group was intended for activation in case of emergencies. The plan drew major controversy after Blakeman stated that such emergency deployments could include riot control in the context of political protests. Blakeman, a Donald Trump ally recently nominated as the Republican Party candidate in the 2026 New York gubernatorial election, was accused by opponents of forming a personal militia. In March 2026, a lawsuit was filed on behalf of county legislators affiliated with the Democratic Party, calling for the force to be disbanded, based partly on evidence that some recruits were not qualified to carry out police work.

== Geography ==
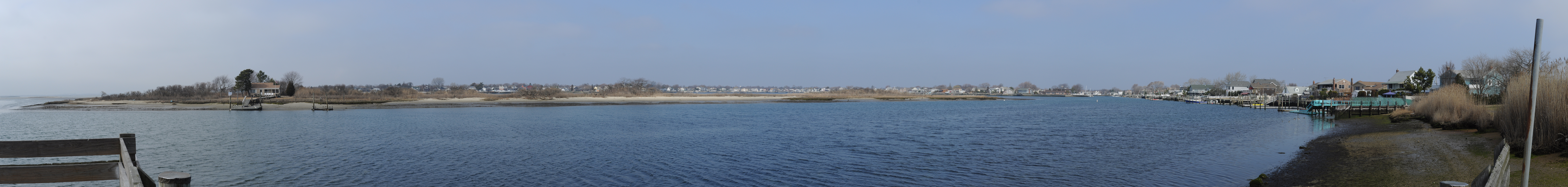
The Village of Freeport on Baldwin Bay

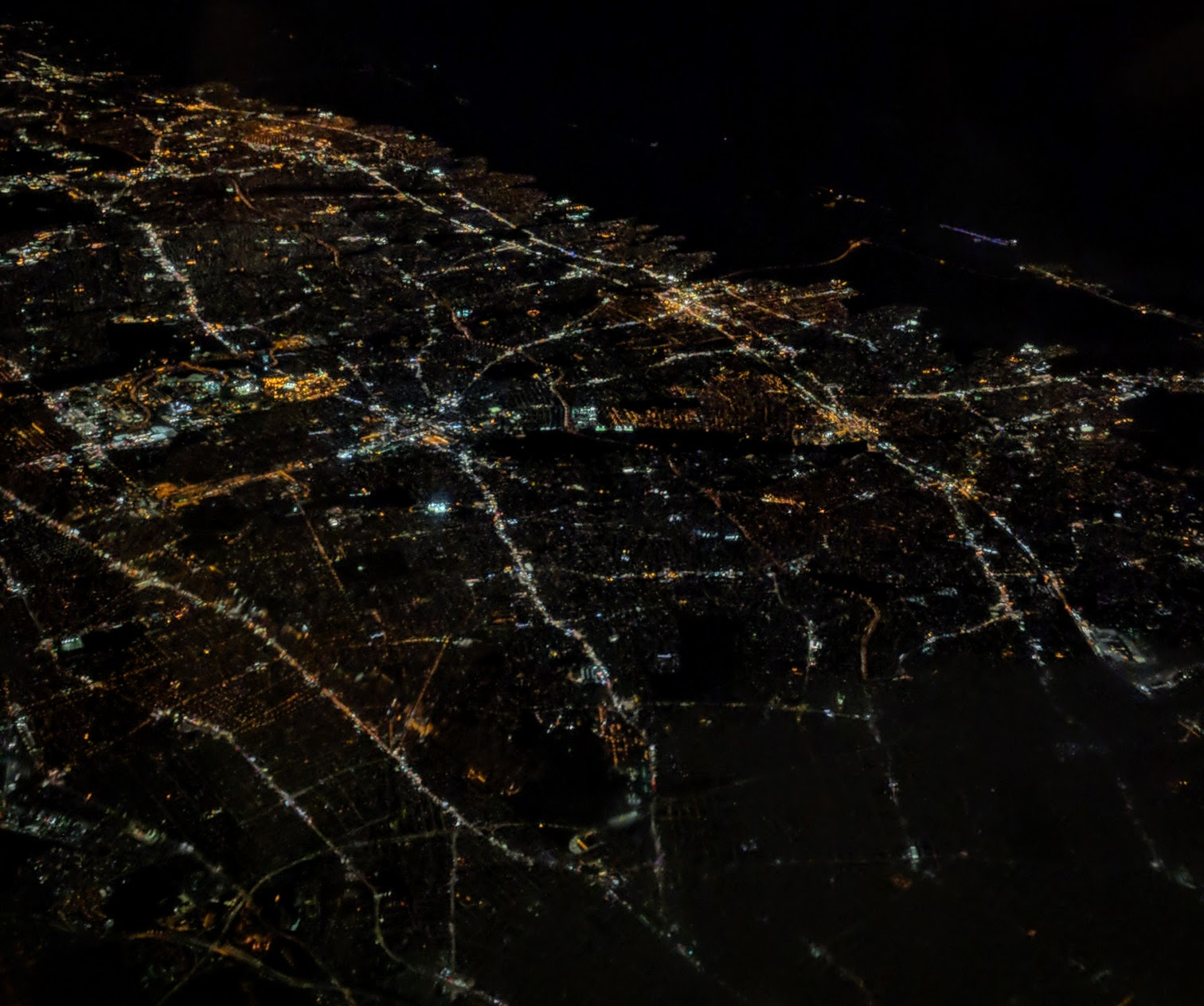
Nighttime aerial view of much of the density of Nassau County, from the west-northwest; Hempstead is in the center, with roads projecting out in various directions; bridges to Jones Beach Island are at the upper right. The Grand Central Parkway–Cross Island Parkway interchange, barely visible at the lower left, is just outside the county, within Queens.

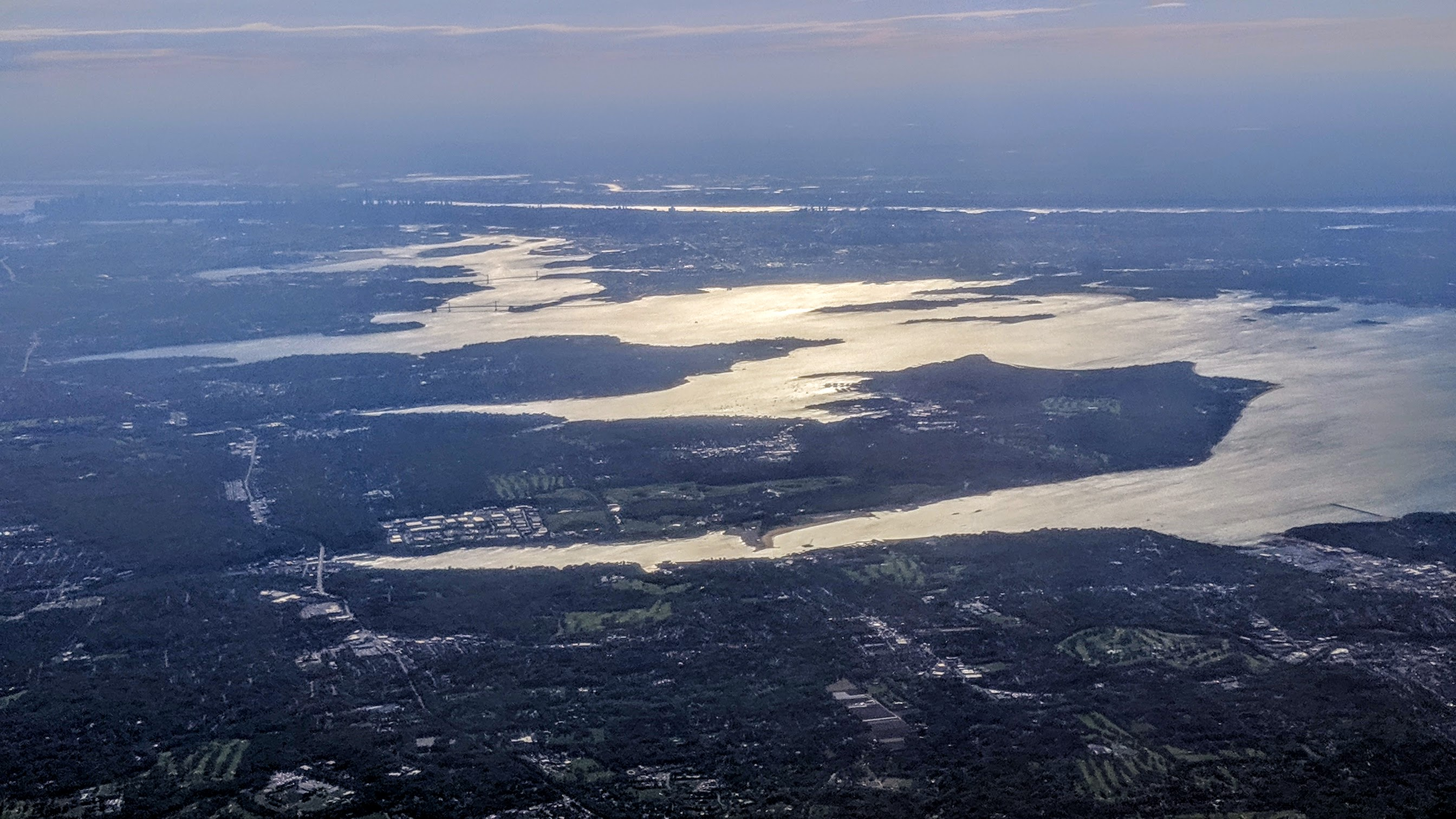
Greenery of the North Shore of Nassau County, looking west. The Cow Neck Peninsula is visible as the first peninsula at the center, with Manhasset Bay immediately above it and Hempstead Harbor immediately below it.

According to the U.S. Census Bureau, the county has a total area of 453.2 square miles (1,174 km^{2}), of which 284.7 square miles (737 km^{2}) is land and 168.5 square miles (436 km^{2}) (37%) is water.

Nassau County borders the Long Island Sound on the north and the open Atlantic Ocean on the south. The highest point in the county is Harbor Hill on the north shore. The county occupies a portion of Long Island immediately east of the New York City borough of Queens. It is divided into two cities and three towns, the latter of which contain 64 villages and numerous hamlets. The county borders Connecticut across the Long Island Sound.

Between the 1990 U.S. census and the 2000 U.S. census, the Nassau County exchanged territory with Suffolk County and lost territory to Queens County. Dozens of CDPs had boundaries changed, and 12 new CDPs were listed.

=== Climate ===
Nassau County has a climate similar to other coastal areas of the Northeastern United States; it has warm, humid summers and cool, wet winters. The county's climate is classified as humid subtropical (Cfa) according to the Köppen climate classification. According to the Trewartha climate classification the climate is oceanic (Do) since six to seven months average above 50″F (10″C). The Atlantic Ocean helps bring afternoon sea breezes that temper the heat in the warmer months and limit the frequency and severity of thunderstorms. Nassau County has a moderately sunny climate, averaging between 2,400 and 2,800 hours of sunshine annually. The hardiness zone is 7b.

Climate data for Mineola, New York
Month	Jan	Feb	Mar	Apr	May	Jun	Jul	Aug	Sep	Oct	Nov	Dec	Year
Record high °F (°C)	71 (22)	73 (23)	85 (29)	94 (34)	97 (36)	101 (38)	105 (41)	104 (40)	100 (38)	90 (32)	83 (28)	76 (24)	105 (41)
Mean daily maximum °F (°C)	39 (4)	43 (6)	50 (10)	61 (16)	70 (21)	80 (27)	85 (29)	83 (28)	76 (24)	65 (18)	55 (13)	45 (7)	63 (17)
Mean daily minimum °F (°C)	26 (−3)	28 (−2)	34 (1)	42 (6)	51 (11)	61 (16)	66 (19)	65 (18)	58 (14)	48 (9)	40 (4)	31 (−1)	46 (8)
Record low °F (°C)	−10 (−23)	−7 (−22)	3 (−16)	13 (−11)	32 (0)	43 (6)	50 (10)	48 (9)	38 (3)	27 (−3)	10 (−12)	−1 (−18)	−10 (−23)
Average precipitation inches (mm)	3.62 (92)	3.17 (81)	4.35 (110)	4.15 (105)	3.90 (99)	3.85 (98)	4.40 (112)	3.72 (94)	3.91 (99)	4.08 (104)	3.73 (95)	3.82 (97)	46.7 (1,186)
Source: The Weather Channel

=== Adjacent counties ===
Nassau County borders the following counties:

- Fairfield County, Connecticut – north (maritime boundary)
- Queens County – west
- Suffolk County – east
- Westchester County – northwest (maritime boundary)
- Bronx County— northwest (maritime boundary)

=== Transportation ===
In July 2017, the approval was granted by state legislators to the plan proposed by New York Governor Andrew Cuomo to add a third railroad track to the Long Island Rail Road corridor between the communities of Floral Park and Hicksville in Nassau County. The nearly US$2 billion transportation infrastructure enhancement project was expected to accommodate anticipated growth in rail ridership and facilitate commutes between New York City and Nassau and Suffolk counties on Long Island.

The Long Island Expressway, Northern State Parkway, and Southern State Parkway are the primary east–west controlled-access highways in Nassau County. Northern Boulevard (New York State Route 25A), Hillside Avenue (New York State Route 25B), Jericho Turnpike (New York State Route 25), New York State Route 24, and Sunrise Highway (New York State Route 27) are also major east–west commercial thoroughfares across the county. The Meadowbrook State Parkway, Wantagh State Parkway, and Seaford–Oyster Bay Expressway (New York State Route 135) are the major north–south controlled-access highways traversing Nassau County.

Nassau County also has a public bus network known as NICE (Nassau Inter-County Express, formerly MTA Long Island Bus) that operates routes throughout the county into Queens and Suffolk counties. 24 hour service is provided on the n4, n6, and most recently the n40/41 lines.

=== National protected areas ===
- Oyster Bay National Wildlife Refuge
- Sagamore Hill National Historic Site
- Lido Beach Wildlife Management Area, a part of the Long Island National Wildlife Refuge Complex

== Demographics ==
Historical population
Census	Pop.	Note	%±
1900	55,448		—
1910	83,930		51.4%
1920	126,120		50.3%
1930	303,053		140.3%
1940	406,748		34.2%
1950	672,765		65.4%
1960	1,300,171		93.3%
1970	1,428,080		9.8%
1980	1,321,582		−7.5%
1990	1,287,348		−2.6%
2000	1,334,544		3.7%
2010	1,339,532		0.4%
2020	1,395,774		4.2%
2025 (est.)	1,398,939	▲	0.2%
U.S. Decennial Census; 1790–1960 1900–1990; 1990–2000 2010–2020

At the 2019 American Community Survey, the population of Nassau County stood at 1,356,924, an increase of 17,392 since the 2010 census. At the 2010 U.S. census, there were 1,339,532 people, 448,528 households, and 340,523 families residing in the county. The population of Nassau County was estimated by the U.S. Census Bureau to have increased by 2.2% to 1,369,514 in 2017, representing 6.9% of the census-estimated State of New York population of 19,849,399 and 17.4% of the census-estimated Long Island population of 7,869,820. At the 2000 United States census, there were 1,334,544 people, 447,387 households, and 347,172 families residing in the county.

In 2010, there were 340,523 family households. 33.5% had children under the age of 18 living with them. 60.0% were married couples living together. 11.7% had a female householder with no husband present. 24.1% were non-families. 20.1% of all households were made up of individuals. 15.1% had someone living alone who was 65 years of age or older. The average household size was 2.94. The average family size was 3.38.

In 2010, the population was 23.3% under the age of 18. 18.7% were 62 years of age or older. The median age was 41.1 years. For every 100 females, there were 93.7 males. For every 100 females age 18 and over, there were 90.4 males. In 2019, there were 474,165 housing units and 446,977 family households. From 2015 to 2019, there was an average of 2.99 persons per household, and 21.4% of the population was under 18 years of age.

At the 2019 American Community Survey, Nassau had a median household income of $116,100. The per capita income was $51,422. About 5.6% of the population lived at or below the poverty line. The median income for a household in the county in 2010 was $72,030. and the median income for a family was $81,246. These figures had risen to $87,658 and $101,661 respectively according to a 2007 estimate. Males had a median income of $52,340 versus $37,446 for females. The per capita income for the county was $32,151. About 3.50% of families and 5.20% of the population were below the poverty line, including 5.80% of those under age 18 and 5.60% of those age 65 or over. The population density in 2010 was 4,700 people per square mile (1,800 people/km^{2}). In 2000, the population density was 4,655 inhabitants per square mile (1,797/km^{2}). In the 2010 census, there were 468,346 housing units at an average density of 1,598 per square mile (617/km^{2}).

=== Race and ethnicity ===
Racial groups and ethnicity on Long Island compared to state and nation
Place	Population 2010 census	% white	% black or African American	% Asian	% Other^{†}	% mixed race	% Hispanic/ Latino of any race
		Race					Ethnicity
Nassau County	1,339,532	71.0	11.1	7.6	5.9	2.4	14.6
Suffolk County	1,493,350	81.0	7.3	3.4	5.9	2.4	16.5
Long Island Total (including Brooklyn and Queens)	7,568,304	54.7	20.4	12.3	9.3	3.2	20.5
NY State	19,378,102	65.7	15.9	7.3	8.0	3.0	17.6
USA	308,745,538	72.4	12.6	4.8	7.3	2.9	16.3
^{†}American Indian, Native Alaskan, Native Hawaiian, and Pacific Islander make up just 0.5% of the population of Long Island, and have been included with "Other".

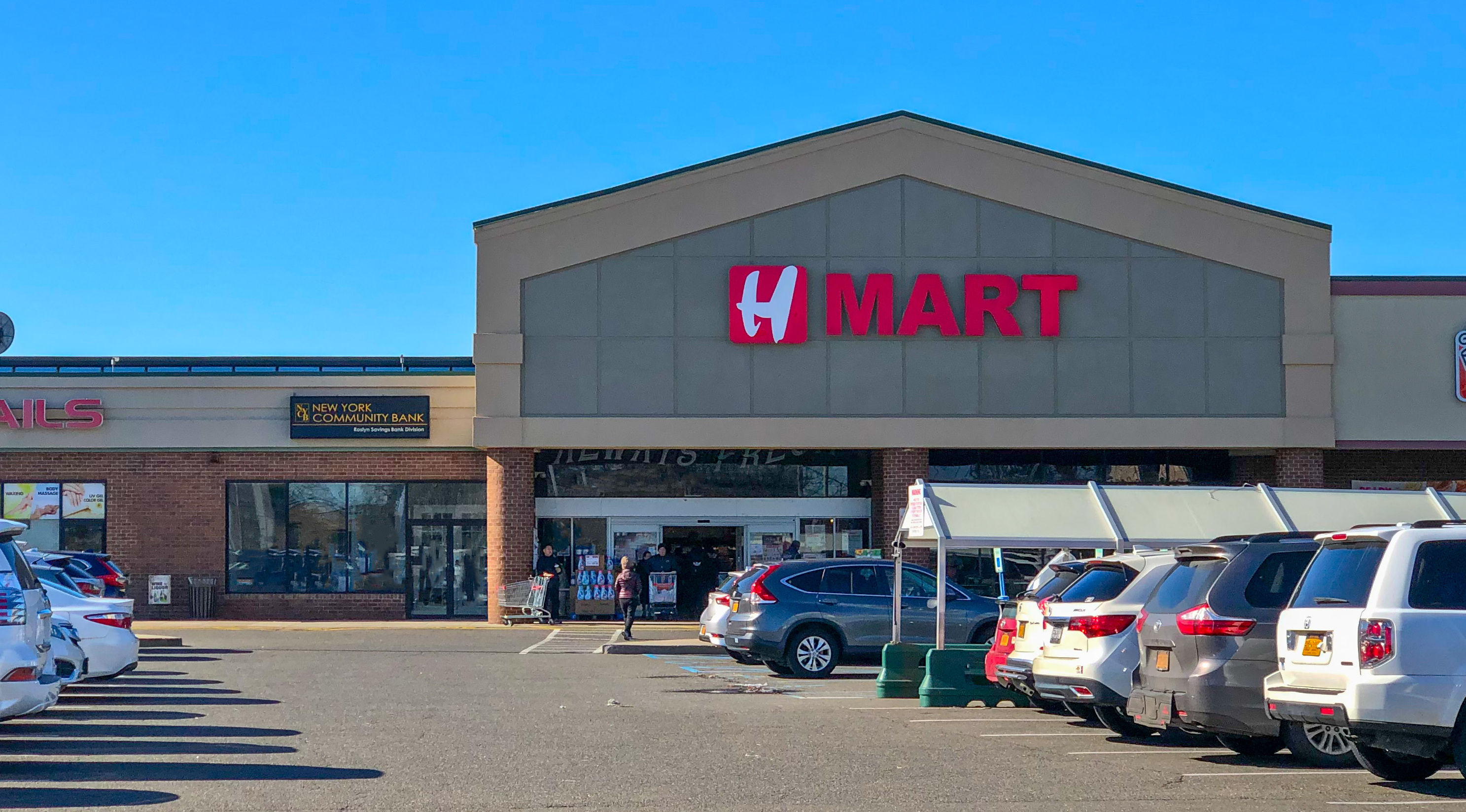
H Mart in Jericho – one of the busiest H Mart stores on Long Island and one of the busiest Asian-grocery stores outside Asia

In 2010, the racial makeup of the county was 73.0% White (65.5% non-Hispanic white), 10.1% African American, 0.2% Native American, 7.6% Asian (3.0% Indian, 1.8% Chinese, 1.0% Korean, 0.7% Filipino, 0.1% Japanese, 0.1% Vietnamese, 0.9% Other Asian), 0.03% Pacific Islander, 5.6% from other races, and 2.4% from two or more races. Hispanics or Latinos of any race were 15.6% of the population. In 2019, Nassau County's racial and ethnic makeup was 58.2% non-Hispanic white, 11.3% Black or African American, 0.2% American Indian or Alaska Native, 10.3% Asian, 0.7% some other race, and 1.9% two or more races. The Hispanic and Latin American population increased to 17.5% of the population.

Nassau County, New York – Racial and ethnic composition Note: the US Census treats Hispanic/Latino as an ethnic category. This table excludes Latinos from the racial categories and assigns them to a separate category. Hispanics/Latinos may be of any race.
Race / Ethnicity (NH = Non-Hispanic)	Pop 1980	Pop 1990	Pop 2000	Pop 2010	Pop 2020	% 1980	% 1990	% 2000	% 2010	% 2020
White alone (NH)	1,171,317	1,063,903	986,947	877,309	779,454	88.63%	82.64%	73.95%	65.49%	55.84%
Black or African American alone (NH)	88,414	105,315	129,860	141,305	147,216	6.69%	8.18%	9.73%	10.55%	10.55%
Native American or Alaska Native alone (NH)	892	1,262	1,311	1,379	1,714	0.07%	0.10%	0.10%	0.10%	0.12%
Asian alone (NH)	14,472	38,434	62,744	101,558	163,165	1.10%	2.99%	4.70%	7.58%	11.69%
Native Hawaiian or Pacific Islander alone (NH)	x	x	272	197	292	x	x	0.02%	0.01%	0.02%
Other race alone (NH)	3,201	1,048	3,014	4,740	11,780	0.24%	0.08%	0.23%	0.35%	0.84%
Mixed race or Multiracial (NH)	x	x	17,114	17,689	35,728	x	x	1.28%	1.32%	2.56%
Hispanic or Latino (any race)	43,286	77,386	133,282	195,355	256,425	3.28%	6.01%	9.99%	14.58%	18.37%
Total	1,321,582	1,287,348	1,334,544	1,339,532	1,395,774	100.00%	100.00%	100.00%	100.00%	100.00%

In 2011, there were about 230,000 Jewish people in Nassau County, representing 17.2% of the population, (as compared to 2% of the total U.S. population). Italian Americans also made up a large portion of Nassau's population. The five most reported ancestries were Italian (23%), Irish (14%), German (7%), Indian (5%), and Polish (4%). The county's population was highest at the 1970 U.S. census. More recently, a Little India community has emerged in Hicksville, Nassau County, spreading eastward from the more established Little India enclaves in Queens. Rapidly growing Chinatowns have developed in Brooklyn and Queens, as did earlier European immigrants, such as the Irish and Italians.

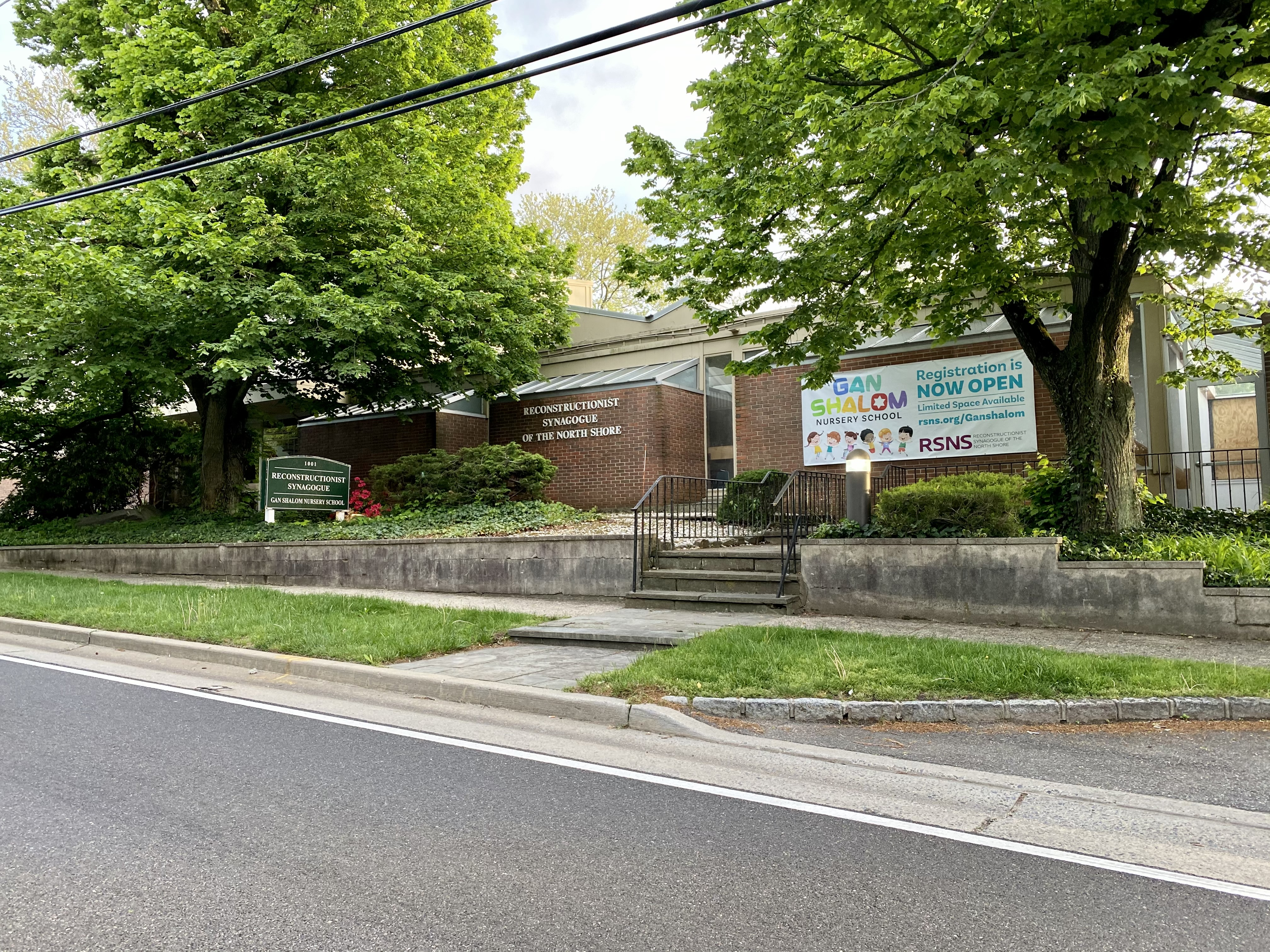
Reconstructionist Synagogue of the North Shore in Plandome – one of many Jewish synagogues in Nassau County

As of 2025, the Asian population in Nassau County had nearly doubled since 2010, to an estimated 191,956 individuals, including approximately 66,235 Indian Americans and 64,469 Chinese Americans. Nassau County has become the leading suburban destination in the U.S. for new Chinese immigrants, seeking top-ranked school districts and proximity to Queens. Likewise, the Long Island Koreatown originated in Flushing, Queens, and is expanding eastward along Northern Boulevard and into Nassau County. The New York Times cited a 2002 study by the non-profit group ERASE Racism, which determined that Nassau, and its neighboring county, Suffolk, as the most de facto racially segregated suburbs in the United States.

Religious groups on Long Island compared to state and nation
Place	Population 2010 census	% Catholic	% not affiliated	% Jewish	% Protestant	Estimate of % not reporting
Nassau County	1,339,532	52	9	16	7	15
Suffolk County	1,493,350	52	21	7	8	11
Long Island Total (including Brooklyn and Queens)	7,568,304	40	18	12	7	20
NY State	19,378,102	42	20	9	10	16
USA	308,745,538	22	37	2	23	12

== Law enforcement ==
Nassau County has been ranked by U.S. News and World Report as having the lowest crime rate in the U.S. County police services are provided by the Nassau County Police Department. The cities of Glen Cove and Long Beach, as well as a number of villages, are not members of the county police district and maintain their own police forces. The following village police departments exist in Nassau County: Brookville (Brookville P.D. provides police protection for Brookville, Matinecock, Mill Neck and Cove Neck), Centre Island, Floral Park, Freeport, Garden City, Great Neck Estates, Hempstead, Kensington, Kings Point, Lake Success, Lynbrook, Malverne, Muttontown-UpperBrookville, Old Brookville, Old Westbury, Oyster Bay Cove, Rockville Centre, and Sands Point.

The Port Washington Police District is not a village department, but is instead authorized by a special district – the only such district in the State of New York. These smaller forces make use of such specialized county police services as the police academy and the aviation unit. All homicides and auto-related fatalities in the county are investigated by the county police, regardless of whether or not they occur within the police district.

In June 2011, the Muttontown Police Department commenced operations. The Old Brookville Police had formerly provided police services to the Village of Muttontown.

On June 1, 2022, the Old Brookville Police Department reverted to serving only the Village of Old Brookville and moved its headquarters to the grounds of the Old Brookville village hall. The Village of Brookville formed a new police department, established headquarters on the grounds of the Brookville Nature Park and assumed policing duties for the villages of Brookville, Matinecock, Mill Neck and Cove Neck, that were formerly served by the Old Brookville Police Department. The Village of Upper Brookville joined the Muttontown Police Department which was subsequently renamed the Muttontown-Upper Brookville (MUB) Police Department. The former Old Brookville Police headquarters is now the Upper Brookville village hall and also a substation for the Muttontown-Upper Brookville Police Department.

In 2006, village leaders in the county seat of Mineola expressed dissatisfaction with the level of police coverage provided by the county force and actively explored seceding from the county police district and having the village form its own police force. A referendum in December 2006 decisively defeated the proposal.

Since the Long Island State Parkway Police was disbanded in 1980, all of Nassau County's state parkways have been patrolled by Troop L of the New York State Police. State parks in Nassau are patrolled by the New York State Park Police. In 1996, the Long Island Rail Road Police Department was consolidated into the Metropolitan Transportation Authority Police. The MTA Police patrol Long Island Rail Road tracks, stations and properties. The New York State Department of Environmental Conservation Police provides enforcement of state environmental laws and regulations. The State University of New York Police provides enforcement for SUNY Old Westbury.

The Nassau County Police Department posts the mug shots of DWI offenders as press releases on their website. This practice has come under the scrutiny of residents, media, and those pictured in these press releases. This practice has been criticized as being able to cost potential employees, students, or public figures their positions.

County correctional services and enforcement of court orders are provided by the Nassau County Sheriff's Department. New York State Court Officers provide security for courthouses.

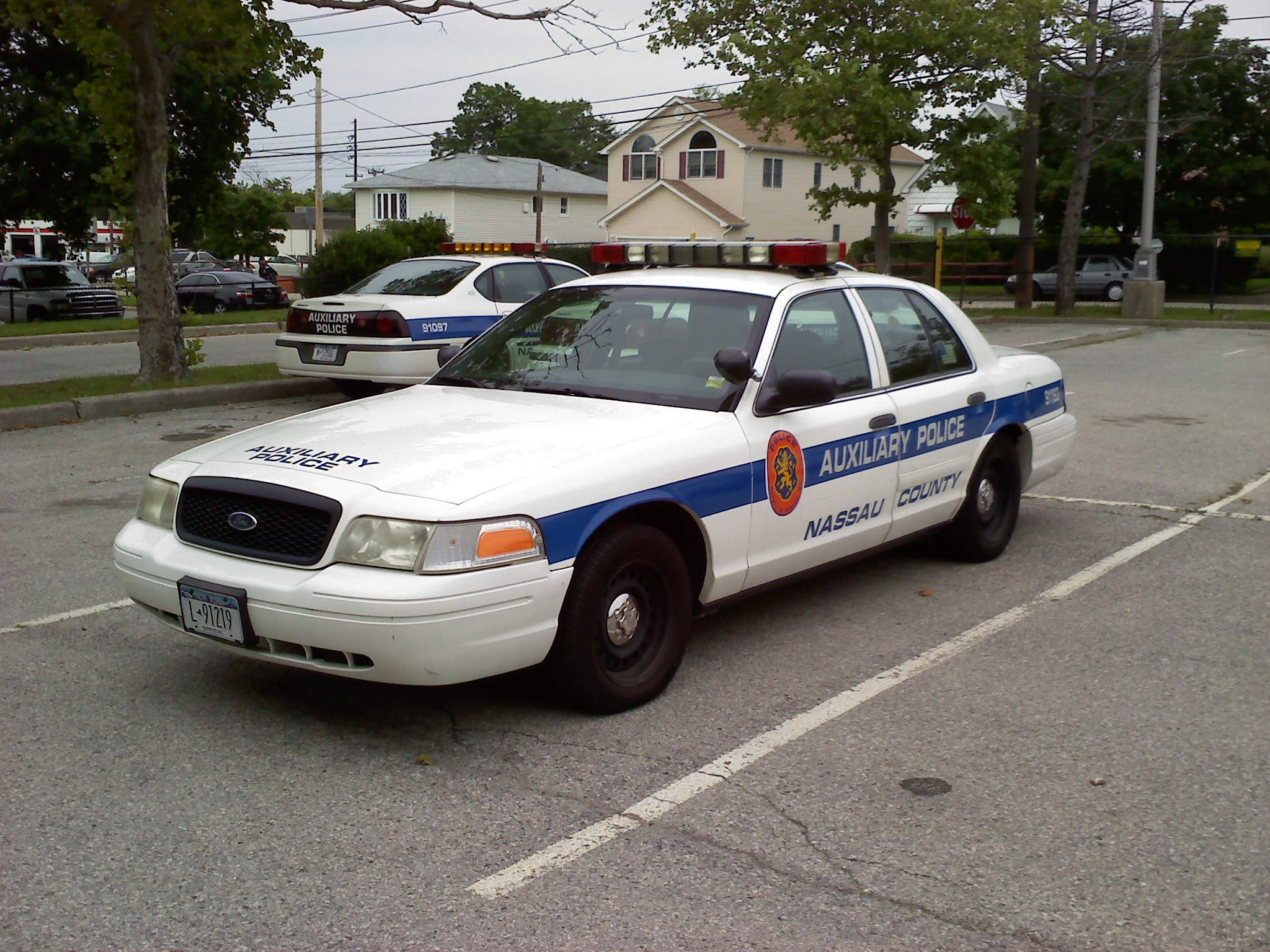
Nassau County Auxiliary Police car

The Nassau County Auxiliary Police are a unit of the Nassau County Police Department. These volunteer police officers are assigned to 1 of 38 local community units and perform routine patrols of the neighborhood. They provide traffic control for local parades, races and other community events. Auxiliary Police officers are empowered to make arrests for crimes that occur in their presence.

Nassau County Auxiliary Police are required to complete a 42-week training course at the Nassau County Police Academy. Qualified officers are offered Emergency Medical Technician (EMT) training. Auxiliary Police officers are certified and registered by the New York Division of Criminal Justice Services as full-time "peace officers". The City of Long Beach has an independent auxiliary police force which is part of its municipal police force. These officers are represented by the Auxiliary Police Benevolent Association of Long Island.

== Fire departments ==
Nassau County is currently protected and served by 71 independent volunteer or combination paid/volunteer fire departments, organized into 9 battalions. The Nassau County Fire Commission also provides logistical support to all 71 departments.

1st Battalion
Department Number	Department Name
100	Bellerose Village Fire Department
110	Bellerose Terrace Fire Department
120	Floral Park Fire Department
130	Floral Park Centre Fire Company No.1
140	Garden City Fire Department
150	Garden City Park Fire Department
160	Mineola Fire Department
170	New Hyde Park Fire Department
180	South Floral Park Fire Department
190	Stewart Manor Fire Department

2nd Battalion
Department Number	Department Name
200	Baldwin Fire Department
210	Freeport Fire Department
220	Island Park Fire Department
230	Long Beach Fire Department
240	Oceanside Fire Department
250	Point Lookout-Lido Fire Department

3rd Battalion
Department Number	Department Name
300	Hewlett Fire Department
310	Inwood Fire Department
320	Lawrence-Cedarhurst Fire Department
330	Meadowmere Park Fire Department
340	Valley Stream Fire Department
350	Woodmere Fire Department

4th Battalion
Department Number	Department Name
400	East Rockaway Fire Department
410	Lakeview Fire Department
420	Lynbrook Fire Department
430	Malverne Fire Department
440	Rockville Centre Fire Department

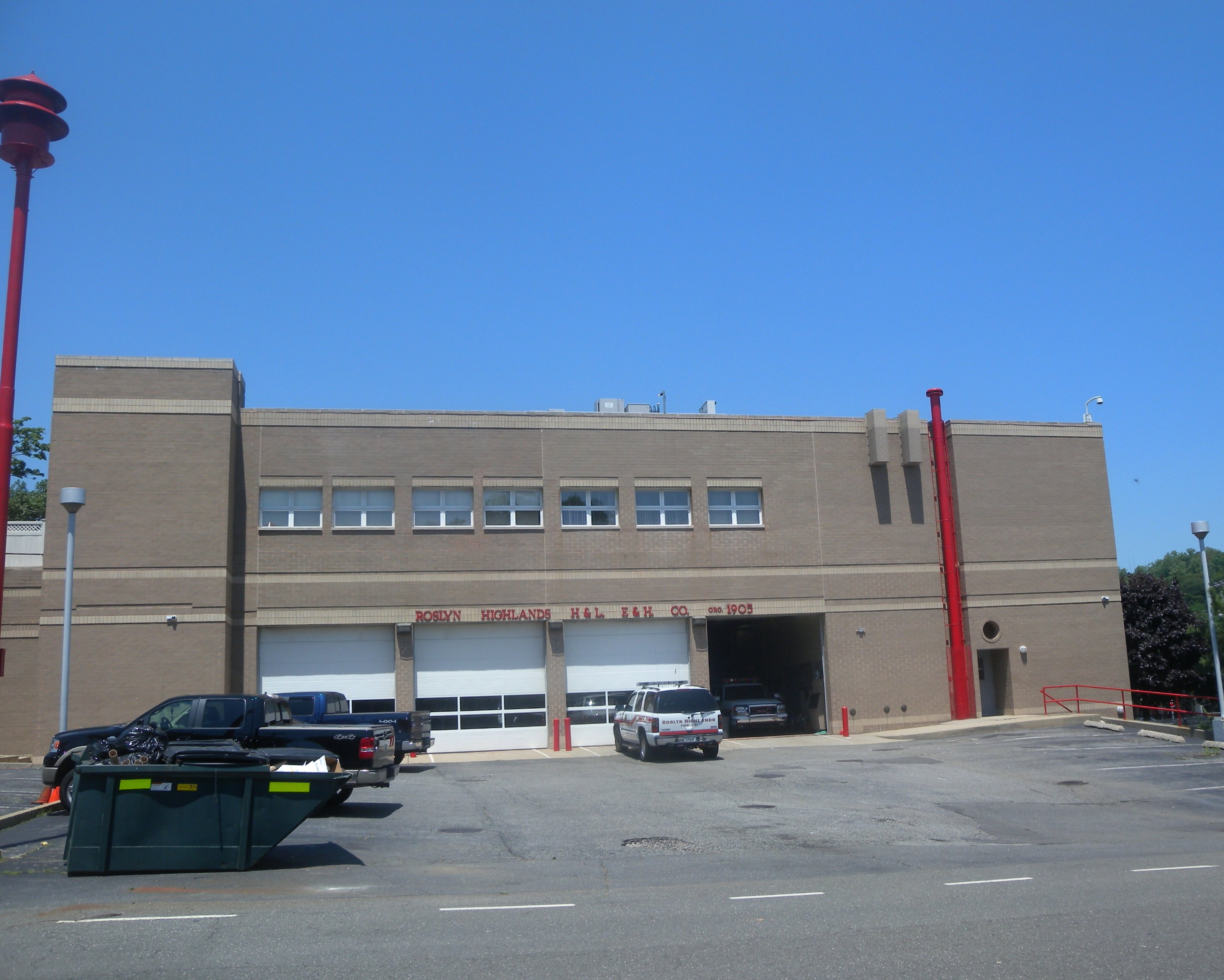
Roslyn Highlands Fire Department Headquarters in Roslyn Heights in 2012

5th Battalion
Department Number	Department Name
500	Bayville Fire Company No.1
510	East Norwich Volunteer Fire Company No.1
520	Glen Cove Fire Department
530	Glenwood Hook & Ladder, Engine & Hose Company
540	Locust Valley Fire Department
550	Oyster Bay Fire Company No.1 Atlantic Steamers Fire Company No.1
560	Roslyn Rescue Hook & Ladder Company No.1
570	Sea Cliff Fire Department
580	Syosset Fire Department
590	Roslyn Highlands Hook & Ladder, Engine & Hose Company No.1

6th Battalion
Department Number	Department Name
600	Bellmore Fire Department
610	East Meadow Fire Department
620	Levittown Fire Department
630	Massapequa Fire Department
640	Merrick Fire Department
650	North Bellmore Fire Department
660	North Massapequa Fire Department
670	North Merrick Fire Department
680	Seaford Fire Department
690	Wantagh Fire Department

7th Battalion
Department Number	Department Name
700	Elmont Fire Department
710	Franklin Square & Munson Fire Department
720	Hempstead Fire Department
730	Roosevelt Fire Department
740	South Hempstead Fire Department
750	Uniondale Fire Department
760	West Hempstead Fire Department

8th Battalion
Department Number	Department Name
800	Albertson Hook, Ladder, Engine & Hose Company No.1
810	East Williston Fire Department
820	Great Neck Alert Fire Company No.1
830	Great Neck Vigilant Engine, Hook & Ladder Company
840	Plandome Fire Department
850	Port Washington Fire Department
860	Williston Park Fire Department
870	Manhasset-Lakeville Fire Department

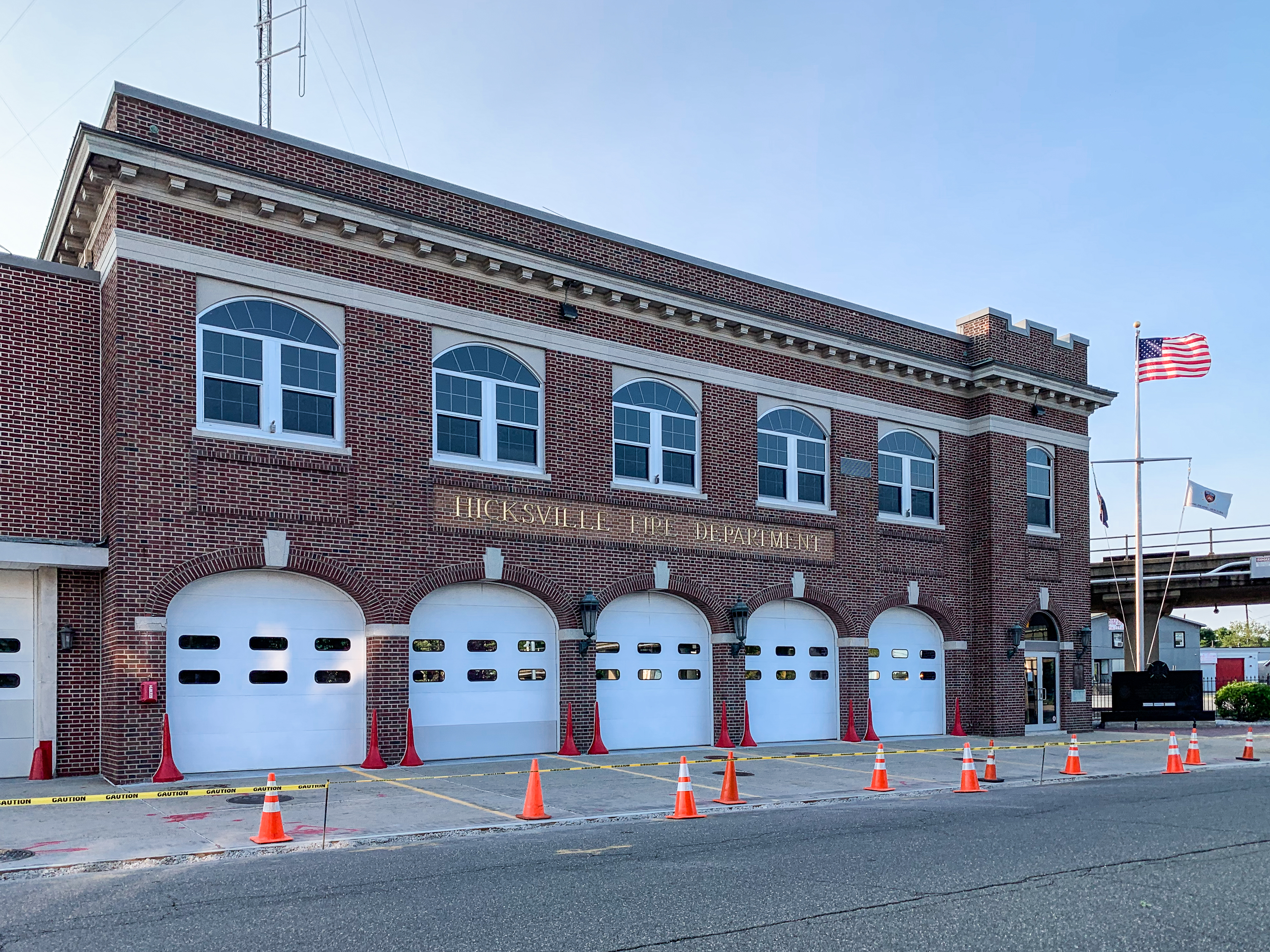
Hicksville Fire Department in 2019

9th Battalion
Department Number	Department Name
900	Bethpage Fire Department
910	Carle Place Fire Department
920	Farmingdale Fire Department
930	Hicksville Fire Department
940	Jericho Fire Department
950	Plainview Fire Department
960	Westbury Fire Department
970	South Farmingdale Fire Department

== Law and government ==
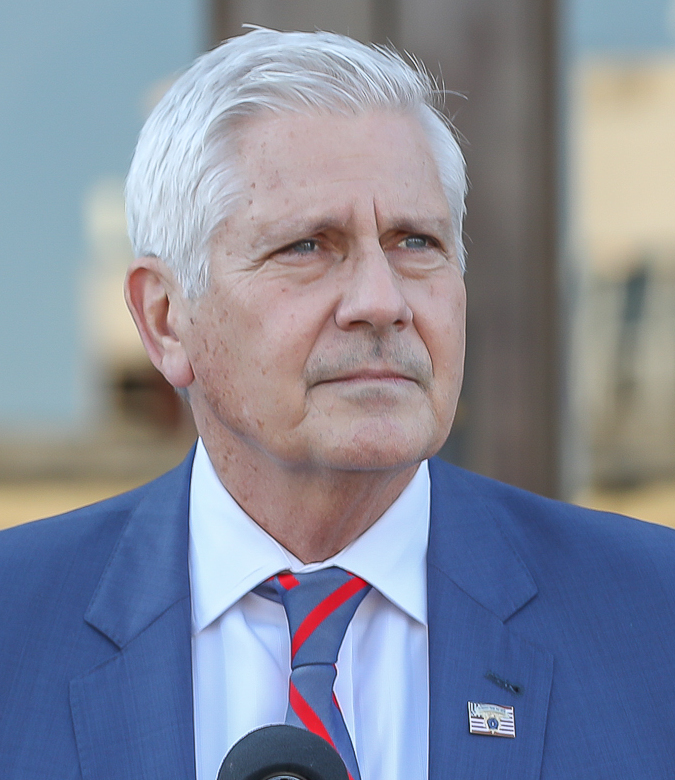
Nassau County Executive Bruce Blakeman (R)

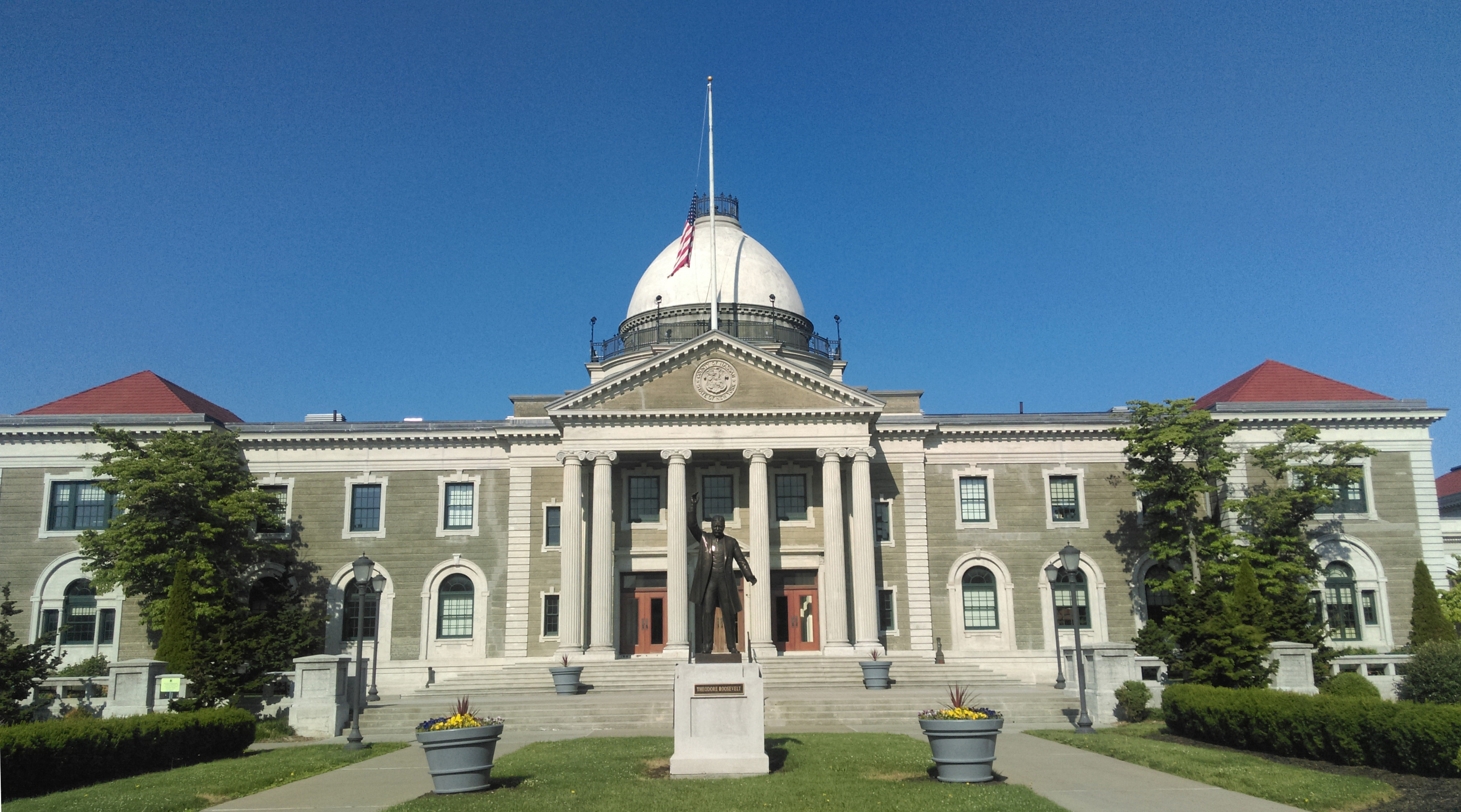
Theodore Roosevelt County Executive and Legislative Building

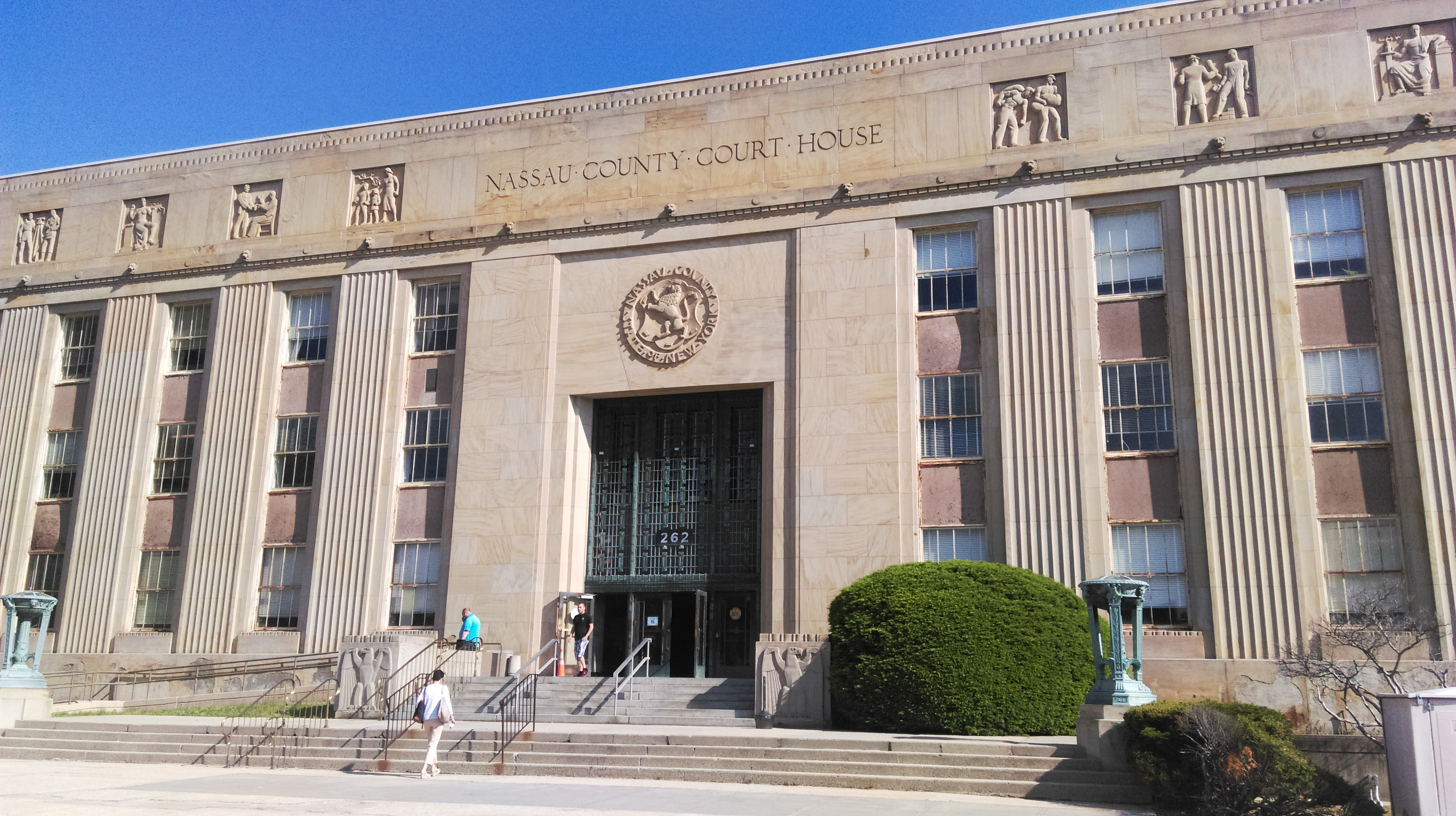
Nassau County Courthouse

The head of the county's governmental structure is the county executive, a post created in Nassau County in 1938. The current county executive is Bruce Blakeman, a Republican who was elected in 2021. The chief deputy county executive is Republican Arthur Walsh. The district attorney is Republican Anne T. Donnelly, who was elected in 2021, replacing Acting District Attorney Joyce Smith. Smith succeeded Madeline Singas after she was nominated and confirmed as an associate judge on the New York Court of Appeals in June 2021.

The county comptroller is Elaine Phillips, a Republican who formerly served in the New York State Senate. The county clerk is Republican Maureen O'Connell. Former elected offices chairman of the County Board of Assessors, county treasurer, and county sheriff were made appointed and serve at the pleasure of the county executive (county assessor in 2008 via referendum, changing it from a six-year term to appointed).

=== County executive ===
The current Nassau County executive is Bruce Blakeman, a Republican.

Nassau County executives
Name	Party	Term
J. Russell Sprague	Republican	1938–1953
A. Holly Patterson	Republican	1953–1962
Eugene Nickerson	Democratic	1962–1970
Ralph G. Caso	Republican	1970–1978
Francis T. Purcell	Republican	1978–1987
Thomas Gulotta	Republican	1987–2001
Tom Suozzi	Democratic	2002–2009
Ed Mangano	Republican	2010–2017
Laura Curran	Democratic	2018–2021
Bruce Blakeman	Republican	2022–present

=== Chief deputy county executive ===
The chief deputy county executive is the highest appointed official in the Nassau County government, serving second-in-command under the auspice of the county executive. The Chief Deputy is responsible for managing the activities of all departments of the Nassau County government, which provides services to its 1.36 million residents. The chief deputy also officially serves as the acting county executive in the absence of, or disability of the County Executive. The current chief deputy county executive is Arthur T. Walsh, who was appointed by Executive Bruce Blakeman in 2022.

Chief Deputy County Executives
Name	Party	Term	Served Under
Robert McDonald	Republican	1993–1999	Thomas Gulotta
Judy Schwartz	Republican	1999–2001	Thomas Gulotta
Anthony Cancillieri	Democrat	2002–2005	Thomas Suozzi
Christopher Hahn	Democrat	2006–2009	Thomas Suozzi
Robert Walker	Republican	2010–2017	Edward Mangano
Helena Williams	Democrat	2018–2021	Laura Curran
Arthur Walsh	Republican	2022–present	Bruce Blakeman

=== Comptroller ===
The comptroller of Nassau County is the chief fiscal officer and chief auditing officer of the County who presides over the Nassau County Comptroller's Office. The comptroller is elected countywide to a four-year term and has no term limit.

Nassau County Comptrollers (Nassau County Comptroller's Office)
Order	Name	Term	Party
1	John Lyon	January 1, 1911 – December 31, 1913	Republican
2	Chas L. Phipps	January 1, 1914 – January 3, 1916	Republican
3	Earl J. Bennett	January 14, 1916 – December 31, 1922	Republican
4	Philip Wiederson	January 1, 1923 – December 31, 1934	Republican
5	Theodore Bedell	January 1, 1935 – December 31, 1964	Republican
6	Peter P. Rocchio Sr.	January 1, 1965 – December 31, 1967	Democratic
7	Angelo D. Roncallo	January 1, 1968 – January 3, 1973	Republican
8	M. Hallstead Christ	January 4, 1973 – August 16, 1981	Republican
9	Peter T. King	August 17, 1981 – December 31, 1992	Republican
10	Alan Gurein	January 1, 1993 – December 31, 1993	Republican
11	Frederick E. Parola	January 1, 1994 – December 31, 2001	Republican
12	Howard S. Weitzman	January 1, 2002 – December 31, 2009	Democratic
13	George Maragos*	January 1, 2010 – September 29, 2016	Republican
13	George Maragos	September 30, 2016 – December 31, 2017	Democratic
14	Jack E. Schnirman	January 1, 2018 – December 31, 2021	Democratic
15	Elaine Phillips	January 1, 2022 – present	Republican

* George Maragos was originally elected as a Republican, but became a Democrat in September 2016.

=== County legislature ===
The county legislature has 19 members. There are eleven Republicans and eight Democrats.

Nassau County Legislature
District	Legislator	Party	Residence
1	Kevan Abrahams, Minority Leader	Democratic	Roosevelt
2	Olena Nicks	Democratic	Westbury
3	Carrié Solages	Democratic	Elmont
4	Denise Ford, Alt. Deputy Presiding Officer	Republican	Long Beach
5	Debra Mule	Democratic	Freeport
6	C. William Gaylor	Republican	Lynbrook
7	Howard Kopel, Deputy Presiding Officer	Republican	Lawrence
8	John Giuffre	Republican	Stewart Manor
9	Richard Nicolello, Presiding Officer	Republican	New Hyde Park
10	Mazi M. Pilip	Republican	Great Neck
11	Delia DeRiggi-Whitton	Democratic	Glen Cove
12	James Kennedy	Republican	Massapequa
13	Thomas McKevitt	Republican	East Meadow
14	Cynthia Nunez	Democrat	Valley Stream
15	Kayla Knight	Wantagh	Levittown
16	Arnold W. Drucker	Democratic	Plainview
17	Rose Marie Walker	Republican	Hicksville
18	Samantha Goetz	Republican	Locust Valley
19	Michael J. Giangregorio	Republican	Merrick

=== Politics ===
United States presidential election results for Nassau County, New York
Year	Republican		Democratic		Third party(ies)	
Year	No.	%	No.	%	No.	%
1900	6,994	61.03%	4,325	37.74%	141	1.23%
1904	8,222	60.02%	5,282	38.56%	195	1.42%
1908	9,787	63.04%	4,883	31.45%	855	5.51%
1912	4,608	24.85%	7,073	38.14%	6,865	37.02%
1916	13,910	61.67%	8,430	37.38%	215	0.95%
1920	33,099	76.39%	8,595	19.84%	1,637	3.78%
1924	45,825	70.47%	14,322	22.02%	4,884	7.51%
1928	71,015	62.77%	40,079	35.42%	2,046	1.81%
1932	78,544	54.51%	61,752	42.85%	3,804	2.64%
1936	94,968	54.97%	74,232	42.96%	3,579	2.07%
1940	143,672	66.12%	73,171	33.67%	450	0.21%
1944	159,713	66.88%	78,512	32.88%	576	0.24%
1948	184,284	69.48%	70,492	26.58%	10,462	3.94%
1952	305,900	69.87%	130,267	29.75%	1,669	0.38%
1956	372,358	69.08%	166,646	30.92%	0	0.00%
1960	324,255	55.12%	263,303	44.76%	761	0.13%
1964	248,886	39.37%	382,590	60.53%	639	0.10%
1968	329,792	51.27%	278,599	43.31%	34,804	5.41%
1972	438,723	63.31%	252,831	36.48%	1,473	0.21%
1976	329,176	51.78%	302,869	47.64%	3,711	0.58%
1980	333,567	55.97%	207,602	34.83%	54,851	9.20%
1984	392,017	61.83%	240,697	37.96%	1,349	0.21%
1988	337,430	56.96%	250,130	42.22%	4,858	0.82%
1992	246,881	40.52%	282,593	46.38%	79,852	13.10%
1996	196,820	36.14%	303,587	55.74%	44,257	8.13%
2000	227,060	38.46%	342,226	57.96%	21,153	3.58%
2004	288,355	46.63%	323,070	52.25%	6,918	1.12%
2008	288,776	45.43%	342,185	53.84%	4,657	0.73%
2012	259,308	45.64%	302,695	53.28%	6,148	1.08%
2016	292,025	45.13%	332,154	51.33%	22,943	3.55%
2020	326,716	44.59%	396,504	54.11%	9,536	1.30%
2024	368,117	51.44%	338,424	47.29%	9,124	1.27%

For most of the twentieth century, residents of Nassau County and neighboring Suffolk County primarily supported the Republican Party in national elections. In presidential elections during the first half of the century, the Republican candidate often received more than twice as many votes as the Democratic candidate. Between the county's incorporation in 1899 and the 1980s, Democrats only won Nassau County in the elections of 1912 (where Theodore Roosevelt's Progressive Party split the Republican vote) and 1964 (where Lyndon B. Johnson won in a landslide).

The county began trending Democratic in the 1990s, like many of New York City's suburbs. From 1992 to 2020, it voted for a Democrat in every presidential election. Bill Clinton carried the county in 1992 and 1996, as did Al Gore in 2000, the latter two times by margins of nearly 20 points. John Kerry's margin in Nassau County was considerably slimmer (5.6 points) in 2004, as he won the towns of Hempstead and North Hempstead but lost the town of Oyster Bay. The county went solidly for Barack Obama in 2008 and 2012, both times by around 8 points. Hillary Clinton did marginally worse in 2016, winning by 6 points. Joe Biden in 2020 fared better than Obama to win the county by 9.5 percentage points, but still not as well as Bill Clinton and Gore.

The streak of Democratic candidates carrying the county ended in 2024, as Donald Trump carried the county by over four percentage points, the first time Nassau was won by a Republican presidential candidate since 1988.

Democratic strength is chiefly concentrated in both the wealthier and lower income sections of the county. Liberal voters dominate many of the wealthy communities of the North Shore, particularly in the Town of North Hempstead where affluent villages such as Sands Point, Old Westbury, Roslyn, Kensington, Thomaston, Great Neck Plaza, and Great Neck Estates as well as the neighboring City of Glen Cove vote consistently Democratic. Democratic strongholds also include several low income municipalities in the central portion of the county, such as the Village of Hempstead, Roosevelt, Uniondale and New Cassel, as well as in a few waterfront communities on the South Shore, such as the City of Long Beach and the Village of Freeport.

Republican voters are primarily concentrated in the middle to upper middle class southeastern portion of the county, which developed during the "post-war boom era". Heavily Republican communities such as Massapequa, Massapequa Park, Seaford, Wantagh, Levittown, Bethpage, and Farmingdale are the political base of many county GOP officials such as former Congressman Peter T. King and former County Executive Edward P. Mangano. In the western portion of the county, wealthy Garden City is solidly Republican, as is the middle-class community of Floral Park. Additionally, some of the more rustic areas of the North Shore, particularly in the Town of Oyster Bay usually vote for the GOP.

Areas of the county containing large numbers of swing voters include East Meadow, Oceanside, and Rockville Centre on the South Shore and Mineola on the North Shore. Several areas have changed in partisan affiliation. Formerly Democratic strongholds such as the Five Towns and parts of Great Neck have trended to the GOP while previously Republican areas such as Elmont, Valley Stream and Baldwin have become Democratic bastions.

=== Representatives ===
U.S. House
District	Representative	Territory
NY-02	Andrew Garbarino	Massapequa, parts of Suffolk County
NY-03	Tom Suozzi	All of North Hempstead and Glen Cove, most of Oyster Bay, parts of Hempstead, parts of Queens and Suffolk County
NY-04	Laura Gillen	All of Long Beach, most of Hempstead

N.Y. State Senate
District	Representative	Territory
5	Steven Rhoads	Wantagh and North Wantagh, Bellmore, Merrick and North Merrick, East Meadow, Levittown, Salisbury, Farmingdale, Hicksville, Bethpage
6	Siela Bynoe	Baldwin, Freeport, Rockville Centre, Hempstead (village), Uniondale, Garden City, Westbury
7	Jack Martins	Northern half of county
8	Alexis Weik	Massapequa and North Massapequa, parts of southwestern Suffolk County
9	Patricia Canzoneri-Fitzpatrick	Valley Stream, Elmont, Floral Park, Malverne, Lynbrook, the Five Towns, East Rockaway, and Long Beach

== Education ==
Education features strongly in Nassau County's culture.

=== School districts ===
Nassau County has 58 public school districts, which like post office districts use the same names as a city, hamlet, or village within them, but each sets the boundaries independently. School district and community are not the same, and residences often have postal addresses that differ from the hamlet and/or school district in which they are located. Several of Nassau County's school districts are among the highest ranked public school systems in the country, including the Jericho Union Free School District, Great Neck Public Schools, and the Syosset Central School District.

School districts include:

==== K-12: ====
- Amityville Union Free School District
- Baldwin Union Free School District
- Bethpage Union Free School District
- Carle Place Union Free School District
- Cold Spring Harbor Central School District
- East Meadow Union Free School District
- East Rockaway Union Free School District
- East Williston Union Free School District
- Farmingdale Union Free School District
- Freeport Public Schools
- Garden City Union Free School District
- Glen Cove City School District
- Great Neck Union Free School District
- Hempstead Union Free School District
- Herricks Union Free School District
- Hewlett-Woodmere Union Free School District
- Hicksville Union Free School District
- Island Park Union Free School District
- Island Trees Union Free School District
- Jericho Union Free School District
- Lawrence Union Free School District
- Levittown Union Free School District
- Locust Valley Central School District
- Long Beach City School District
- Lynbrook Union Free School District
- Malverne Union Free School District
- Manhasset Union Free School District
- Massapequa Union Free School District
- Mineola Union Free School District
- North Shore Central School District
- Oceanside Union Free School District
- Oyster Bay-East Norwich Central School District
- Plainedge Union Free School District
- Plainview-Old Bethpage Central School District
- Port Washington Union Free School District
- Rockville Centre Union Free School District
- Roosevelt Union Free School District
- Roslyn Union Free School District
- Seaford Union Free School District
- Syosset Central School District
- Uniondale Union Free School District
- Wantagh Union Free School District
- West Hempstead Union Free School District
- Westbury Union Free School District

==== Secondary: ====
- Bellmore-Merrick Central High School District
- Sewanhaka Central High School District
- Valley Stream Central High School District

==== Elementary: ====
- Bellmore Union Free School District
- Elmont Union Free School District
- Floral Park-Bellerose Union Free School District
- Franklin Square Union Free School District
- Merrick Union Free School District
- New Hyde Park-Garden City Park Union Free School District
- North Bellmore Union Free School District
- North Merrick Union Free School District
- Valley Stream Union Free School District 13
- Valley Stream Union Free School District 24
- Valley Stream Union Free School District 30

=== Colleges and universities ===
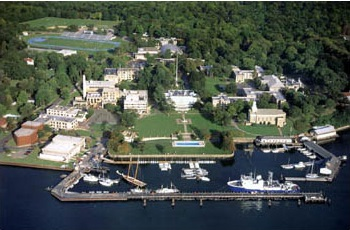
United States Merchant Marine Academy

- United States Service Academy
  - United States Merchant Marine Academy – Kings Point
- State University of New York
  - Nassau Community College – Garden City
  - SUNY Old Westbury – Old Westbury
- Private

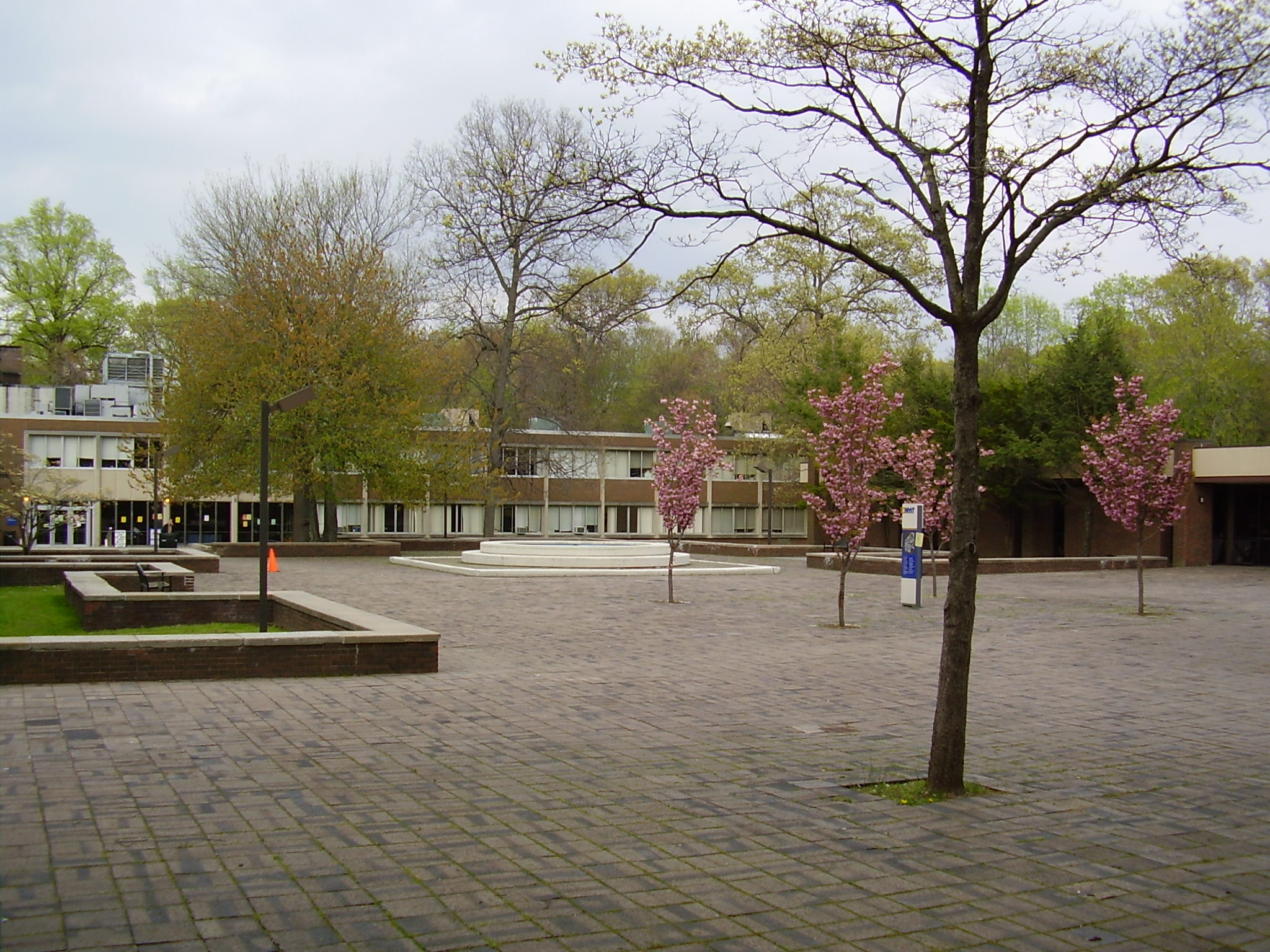
Academic Quad at the New York Institute of Technology's Old Westbury campus

  - Adelphi University – Garden City
  - Hofstra University – Hempstead
    - Zucker School of Medicine
    - Maurice A. Deane School of Law
  - LIU Post – Brookville
  - Molloy University – Rockville Centre
  - New York Institute of Technology – Old Westbury
    - New York Institute of Technology College of Osteopathic Medicine
  - Webb Institute – Glen Cove

== Sports ==
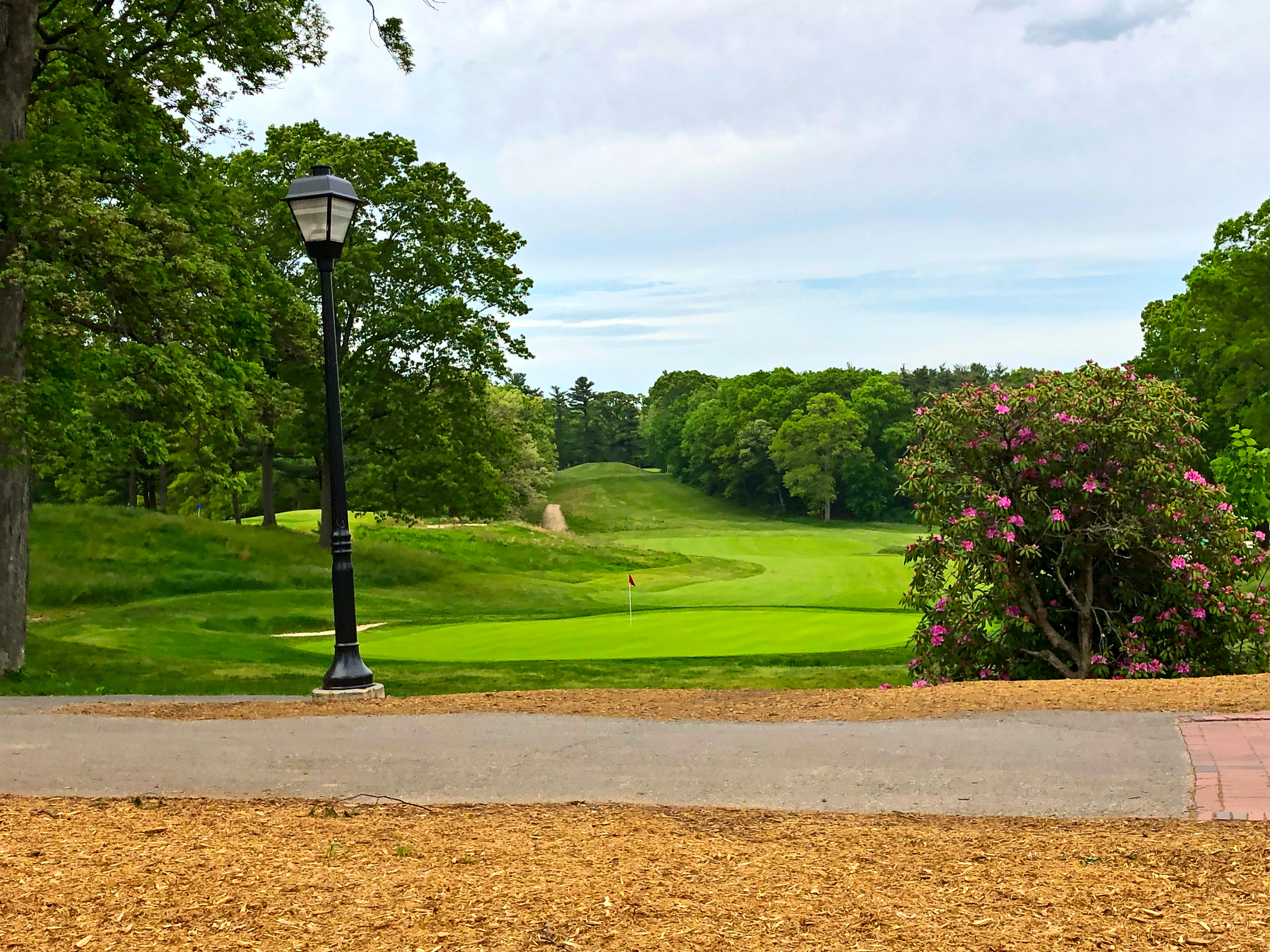
Golf course at Bethpage State Park

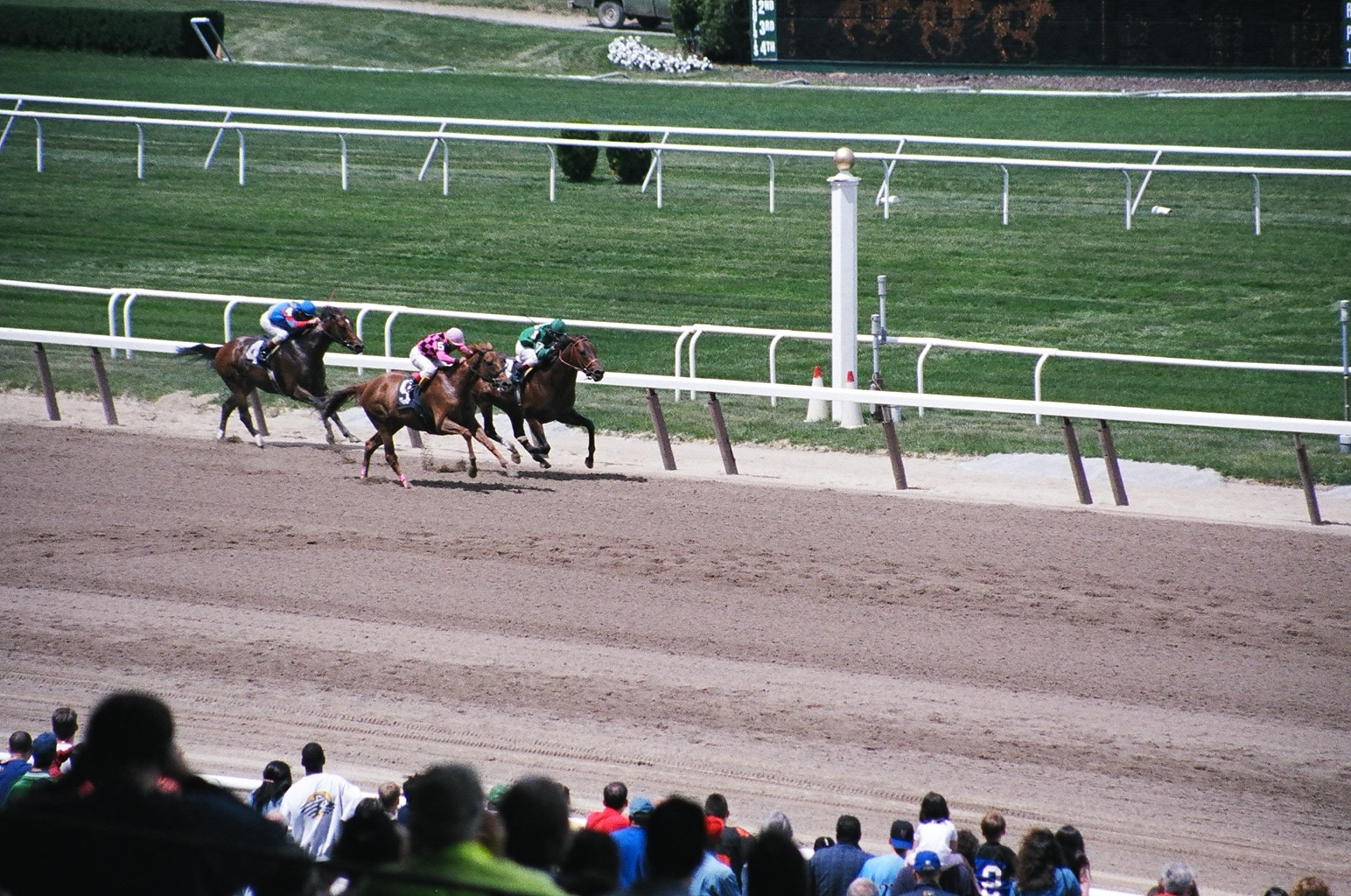
Horse racing at Belmont Park

Nassau County is home to the New York Islanders of the National Hockey League, who played at the Nassau Veterans Memorial Coliseum in Uniondale from their inception in 1972. However, the Islanders announced in 2012 that starting in the fall of 2015, the team would be moving to Brooklyn and would play at the Barclays Center. Due to issues with Barclays Center being unable to adequately support ice hockey and declining attendance, the Islanders announced that for the 2018–19 season they would split their home games between Barclays Center and the newly renovated Nassau Coliseum. In December 2017, the Islanders won a bid to build a new 18,000-seat arena near Belmont Park in Elmont, returning them to Nassau County; UBS Arena opened in 2021.

The Brooklyn Nets of the National Basketball Association, then known as the New York Nets, formerly played their home games in Nassau County at the now-demolished Island Garden arena in West Hempstead from 1969 to 1972 and then at the Coliseum from 1972 to 1977, before the franchise moved to New Jersey—its original home for several years before coming to Long Island in the late 1960s – and eventually, to Brooklyn.

The New York Cosmos (1970–1985) of the former North American Soccer League (1968–1984) played for two seasons, 1972 and 1973, at Hofstra Stadium at Hofstra University in Hempstead. The team's name was revived in 2010 with the New York Cosmos (2010) of the new North American Soccer League to also play at Hofstra Stadium, which had been renamed James M. Shuart Stadium in 2002. Nassau County is also the home of the New York Lizards of Major League Lacrosse, who play at Shuart Stadium. The county also operates several sports events for student-athletes, such as the Nassau County Executive Cup College Showcase.

Belmont Park in Elmont is a major horse racing venue which annually hosts the Belmont Stakes, the third and final leg of the prestigious Triple Crown of thoroughbred racing. The now-demolished Roosevelt Raceway in Westbury hosted auto racing and, from 1940 through 1988, was a popular harness racing track.

Nassau is home to some famous and historic golf courses. Rockaway Hunting Club, founded in 1878, is the oldest country club in the country. The U.S. Open has been held in Nassau five times, once each at Garden City Golf Club, Inwood Country Club, and Fresh Meadow Country Club, and twice at Bethpage Black Course, the first ever municipally owned course. Courses consistently ranked in the top 100 in the U.S. such as Bethpage Black, Garden City Golf Club, Piping Rock Club, and The Creek are located in the county. Nassau County hosted the 1984 Summer Paralympics, marking the first Paralympic Games to be held in the United States.

Nassau County hosted eight cricket matches of the 2024 ICC Men's T20 World Cup at Eisenhower Park in East Meadow during June 2024.

== Health ==
The first case of COVID-19 was reported in March 2020. As of January 12, 2021, there have been 104,078 cases, 3,044 deaths, 2,102,900 tests conducted, and a 4.9% positivity rate. According to The New York Times' COVID-19 tracker, Nassau County's average daily case count is 1,567 (116 per capita), with 1 in 13 testing positive (the third-worst of any county in the state) and 1 in 545 dying.

In August 2024, Nassau County passed into law a ban on wearing face masks in public, making it a misdemeanor subject to a $1,000 fine and up to one year in prison to wear a facial covering in public, a move that was criticized by the New York Civil Liberties Union as a "dangerous misuse of the law to score political points." The law does not apply to facial coverings "worn to protect the health or safety of the wearer," but does appear to ban wearing a mask in order to protect the health or safety of others, including persons with compromised immune systems.

== Hospitals ==
Public hospitals:

- Nassau University Medical Center

Tertiary care hospitals:

- North Shore University Hospital
- NYU Langone Hospital – Long Island
- St. Francis Hospital and Heart Center

Community hospitals:

- Glen Cove Hospital
- Long Island Jewish Valley Stream
- Mercy Medical Center
- Mount Sinai South Nassau
- Plainview Hospital
- St. Joseph Hospital
- Syosset Hospital

== Communities ==
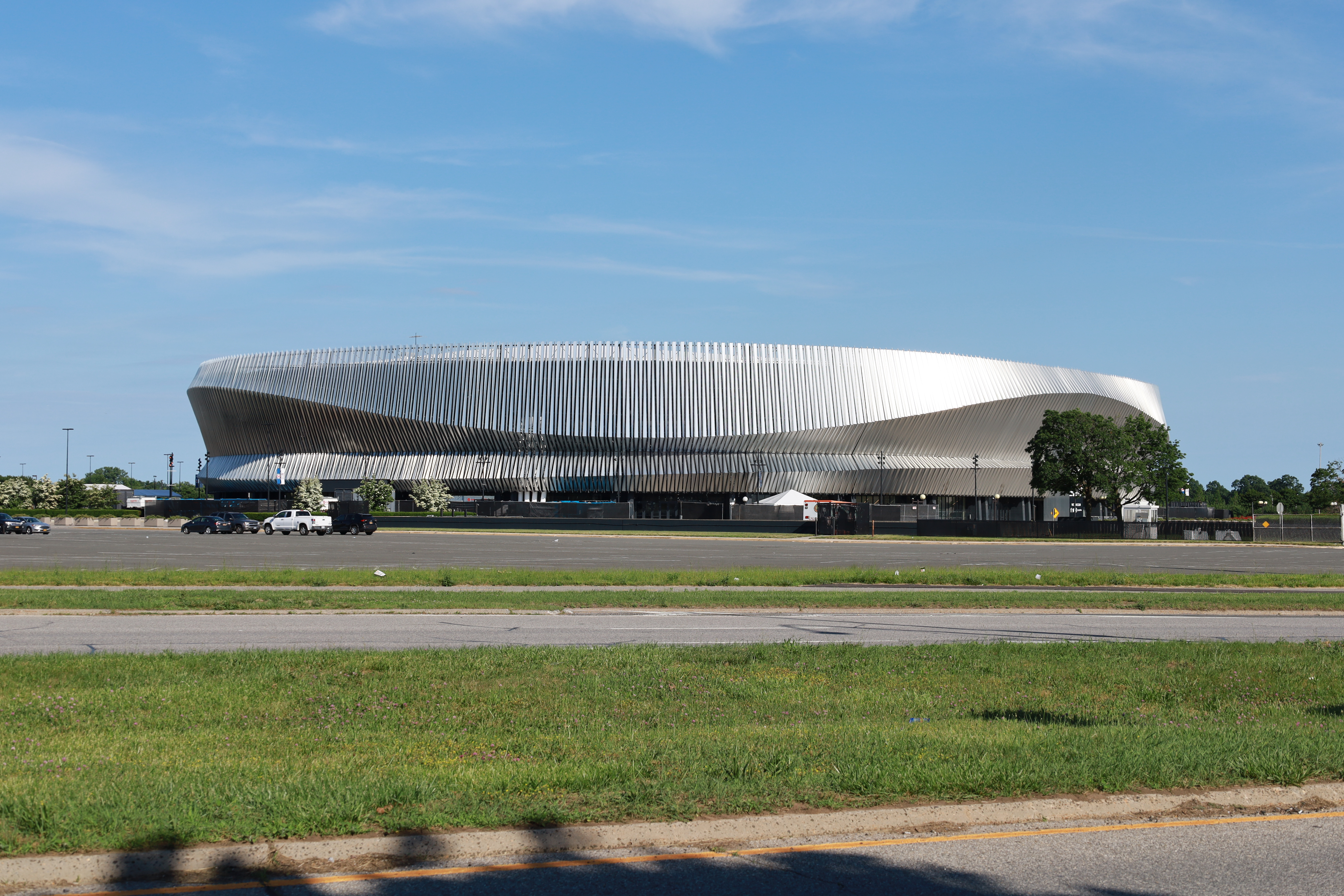

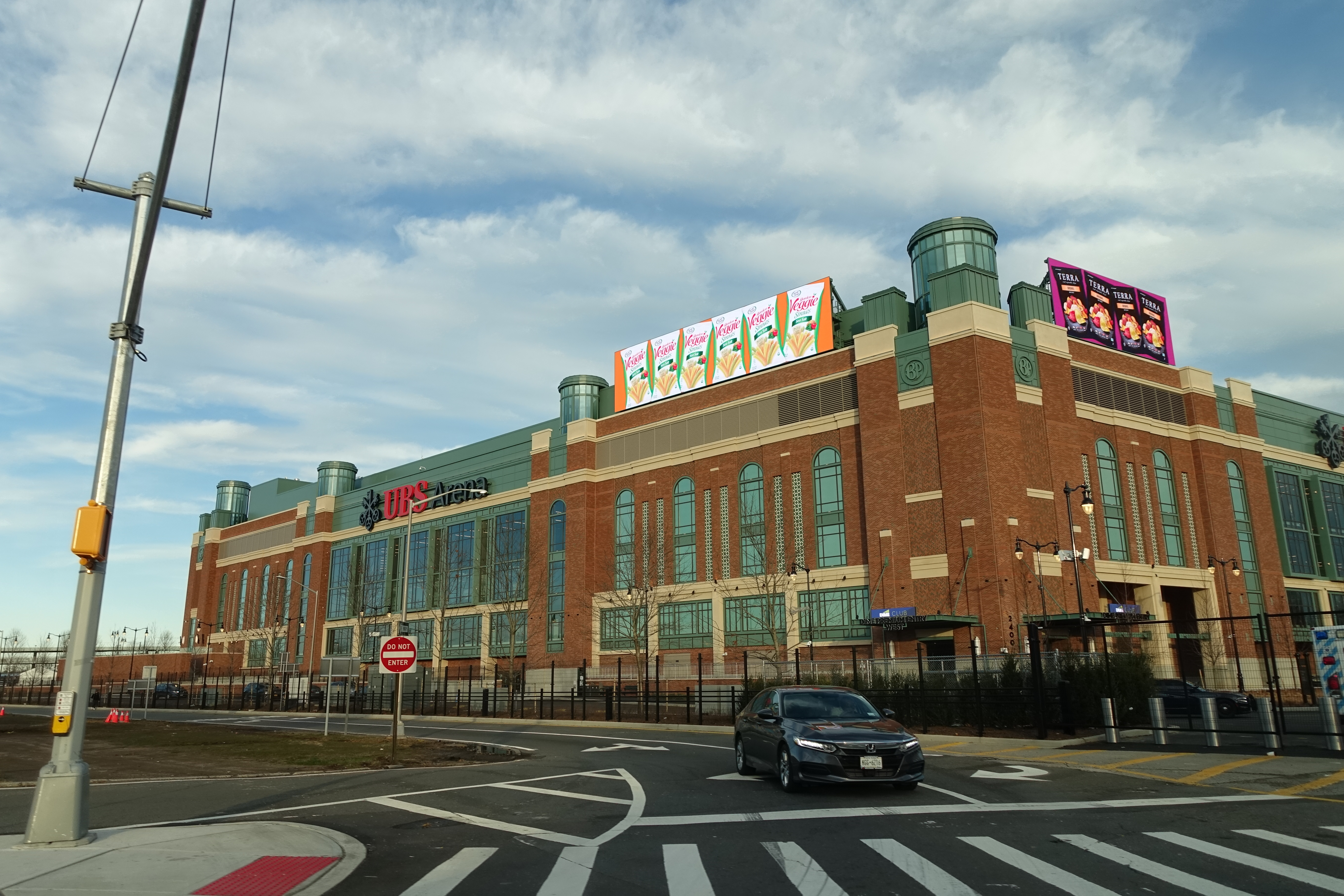
Nassau Veterans Memorial Coliseum in Uniondale (top), and UBS Arena in Elmont (below)

Figures in parentheses are 2019 population estimates from the U.S. Census Bureau.

=== Cities ===
- Glen Cove (27,166)
- Long Beach (33,454)

=== Towns ===
- Hempstead (766,980)
- North Hempstead (230,933)
- Oyster Bay (298,391)

=== Villages ===
- Atlantic Beach (1,902)
- Baxter Estates (1,049)
- Bayville (6,732)
- Bellerose (1,162)
- Brookville (3,605)
- Cedarhurst (6,633)
- Centre Island (409)
- Cove Neck (301)
- East Hills (7,233)
- East Rockaway (9,814)
- East Williston (2,550)
- Farmingdale (9,002)
- Floral Park (15,844)
- Flower Hill (4,889)
- Freeport (42,956)
- Garden City (22,454)
- Great Neck (10,209)
- Great Neck Estates (2,879)
- Great Neck Plaza (7,027)
- Hempstead (55,113)
- Hewlett Bay Park (429)
- Hewlett Harbor (1,272)
- Hewlett Neck (472)
- Island Park (4,886)
- Kensington (1,189)
- Kings Point (5,292)
- Lake Success (3,144)
- Lattingtown (1,764)
- Laurel Hollow (2,033)
- Lawrence (6,556)
- Lynbrook (19,448)
- Malverne (8,485)
- Manorhaven (6,627)
- Massapequa Park (17,143)
- Matinecock (833)
- Mill Neck (967)
- Mineola (19,207) (county seat)
- Munsey Park (2,710)
- Muttontown (3,668)
- New Hyde Park (9,807)
- North Hills (5,969)
- Old Brookville (2,187)
- Old Westbury (4,614)
- Oyster Bay Cove (2,254)
- Plandome (1,466)
- Plandome Heights (1,018)
- Plandome Manor (902)
- Port Washington North (3,199)
- Rockville Centre (24,550)
- Roslyn (2,902)
- Roslyn Estates (1,233)
- Roslyn Harbor (1,108)
- Russell Gardens (946)
- Saddle Rock (988)
- Sands Point (2,905)
- Sea Cliff (5,020)
- South Floral Park (1,760)
- Stewart Manor (1,956)
- Thomaston (2,613)
- Upper Brookville (1,744)
- Valley Stream (37,431)
- Westbury (15,351)
- Williston Park (7,253)
- Woodsburgh (780)

=== Census-designated places ===
- Albertson
- Baldwin
- Barnum Island
- Bay Park
- Bellerose Terrace
- Bellmore
- Bethpage
- Carle Place
- East Atlantic Beach
- East Massapequa
- East Meadow
- East Norwich
- Elmont
- Franklin Square
- Garden City Park
- Garden City South
- Glen Head
- Glenwood Landing
- Great Neck Gardens
- Greenvale
- Harbor Hills
- Harbor Isle
- Herricks
- Hewlett
- Hicksville
- Inwood
- Jericho
- Lakeview
- Levittown
- Lido Beach
- Locust Valley
- Malverne Park Oaks
- Manhasset
- Manhasset Hills
- Massapequa
- Merrick
- New Cassel
- North Bellmore
- North Lynbrook
- North Massapequa
- North Merrick
- North New Hyde Park
- North Valley Stream
- North Wantagh
- Oceanside
- Old Bethpage
- Oyster Bay
- Plainedge
- Plainview
- Point Lookout
- Port Washington
- Roosevelt
- Roslyn Heights
- Saddle Rock Estates
- Salisbury
- Seaford
- Searingtown
- South Farmingdale
- South Hempstead
- South Valley Stream
- Syosset
- Uniondale
- University Gardens
- Wantagh
- West Hempstead
- Woodbury
- Woodmere

==== Former CDPs ====
- Baldwin Harbor (now part of Baldwin)
- East Garden City (now part of Uniondale)
- Locust Grove (now part of Syosset)

== County symbols ==
- County bird: Osprey
- County flower: Birdsfoot Violet (Viola pedata)

== Notable people ==
- Sean Hannity — conservative media host; grew up in Franklin Square, now lives in Centre Island
- Rupert Murdoch — lived in Centre Island
- MJF – professional Wrestler and current AEW World Champion, was born and lives in Plainview
- Matt Cardona – professional Wrestler, Lived in Nassau County
- Brian Myers – professional Wrestler, lived in Nassau County
- Jon Gabrus — lived in Nassau County, worked at Jones Beach State Park as a lifeguard
- Bob Keeshan — (Captain Kangaroo) was born in Lynbrook
- Ben Cohen & Jerry Greenfield – (of Ben & Jerry Ice Cream) both grew up in Merrick
- Kevin James – was born in Mineola
- Tatyana Ali – from North Bellmore
- Criss Angel – from East Meadow
- Carmelo Anthony – is said to have a home in Hewlett Harbor
- Marc Anthony – had a home in Brookville, with Jennifer Lopez
- Judd Apatow – raised in Syosset
- Fred Armisen – grew up in Valley Stream
- Ashanti (singer) – native of Glen Cove
- Dave Attell – raised in Rockville Centre
- Ruth Bader Ginsburg – lived in Rockville Centre after getting married
- John Barry (composer) – lived in Oyster Bay
- The Baldwin brothers-in age order: Alec Baldwin (b. 1958), Daniel Baldwin (b. 1960), William Baldwin (b. 1963), and Stephen Baldwin (b. 1966) – were raised in the Nassau Shores area of Massapequa
- Bruce Blakeman – first Presiding Officer, Port Authority Commissioner, Councilman, County Executive. From Valley Stream, now lives in Atlantic Beach.
- Nikki Blonsky – grew up in Great Neck
- Stephen Boyd (American football) – native of Valley Stream
- Lorraine Bracco – grew up in Hicksville
- Nicholas Braun – native of Bethpage
- Jim Breuer – grew up in Valley Stream
- Jim Brown – grew up in Manhasset
- Lenny Bruce – native of Mineola and Bellmore
- William Cullen Bryant – lived at Cedarmere in Roslyn Harbor
- Edward Burns – grew up in Valley Stream
- Steve Buscemi and Michael Buscemi– grew up in Valley Stream
- Cab Calloway – lived in Long Beach for a time
- Eddie Cantor – lived in Great Neck
- Theresa Caputo – lives in Hicksville
- William J. Casey – lived in Bellmore and Roslyn Harbor
- Vernon and Irene Castle – lived in Long Beach
- Elaine Chao – grew up in Syosset
- Harry Chapin – lived in Jericho
- Michael Cimino – grew up in Westbury
- Speedy Claxton – from Hempstead
- Billy Crystal – is from Long Beach
- Anthony Cumia – radio host, owns a home in Roslyn Heights
- Chuck D – grew up in Roosevelt
- Al D'Amato – US Senator, former Hempstead Supervisor, lived in Island Park and Lido Beach
- Michelle DaRosa – also known as Michelle Nolan, grew up in Rockville Centre
- Carson Daly – resides in Flower Hill
- Tony Danza – Native of Malverne
- Candy Darling – lived in Massapequa Park
- Taylor Dayne – grew up in Baldwin
- Dave DeBusschere – lived in Garden City
- Gary Dell'Abate – native of Uniondale
- Nelson DeMille – lives in Garden City
- Ted Demme – native of Rockville Centre
- Jonathan Demme – grew up in Baldwin
- Brian Dennehy – grew up in Mineola
- Tim Dillon – grew up in Island Park
- Mort Drucker – lived in Syosset
- Julius Erving – native of Roosevelt
- Everlast – grew up in Valley Stream
- Perry Farrell – grew up in Woodmere
- D'Brickashaw Ferguson – grew up in Freeport
- WC Fields – lived in Great Neck
- Flavor Flav – grew up in Freeport
- Whitey Ford – lived in Glen Cove
- Mike Francesa – radio host. Born in Long Beach, lives in Flower Hill
- Bev Francis – IFBB professional Australian female bodybuilder, powerlifter, and national shot put champion; lives in Syosset
- William Gaddis – grew up in Massapequa; later lived in East Hampton
- John R. Gambling – radio host; lifelong county resident
- Joe Gatto (comedian) – lives in Lynbrook
- Pamela Geller – blogger, author, political activist, and commentator
- Debbie Gibson – grew up in Merrick
- Danny Green – played high school basketball in Manhasset
- Ellie Greenwich – lived in Levittown
- Bill Griffith – raised in Levittown
- Steve Guttenberg – raised in North Massapequa
- Tobias Harris – basketball player for the Philadelphia 76ers, lives in Syosset
- George "Gabby" Hayes – lived in Baldwin
- Joey Heatherton – grew up in Rockville Centre
- Ray Heatherton – lived in Rockville Centre
- William S. Hofstra – lived in Hempstead
- Red Holzman – lived in Cedarhurst
- Al Iaquinta – grew up in Valley Stream
- Dan Ingram – native of Oceanside
- Joan Jett – lives in Long Beach
- Billy Joel – grew up in Hicksville, and has a home in Centre Island
- Christine Jorgensen – lived in Massapequa Park
- JWoww – lived in Franklin Square
- Donna Karan – raised in Woodmere
- Andy Kaufman – raised in Great Neck and Westbury
- Charlie Kaufman – grew up in Massapequa
- Wendy Kaufman – lived in North Woodmere
- Doris Kearns Goodwin – lived in Rockville Centre
- Greg Kelly – native of Rockville Centre
- Alicia Keys – once had a home in Muttontown
- Jack Kirby – lived in Hewlett Harbor
- Aline Kominsky-Crumb – native of Long Beach
- Michael Kors – grew up in Merrick
- Sandy Koufax – lived in Rockville Centre
- Ron Kovic – from Massapequa
- Ed Kranepool – lives in Old Westbury
- Paul Krugman – grew up in Merrick
- Tim Kubart – of Postmodern Jukebox is from Farmingdale
- Jesse Lacey – native of Levittown
- Erik Larson (author) – lived in Freeport
- Cyndi Lauper – briefly lived in Valley Stream
- Adam Lazzara – lived in Bellmore
- Stan Lee – lived in Hewlett Harbor
- Carol Leifer – grew up in East Williston
- The Lemon Twigs – based out of Hicksville
- John Lennon – briefly lived in Laurel Hollow
- Alan Jay Lerner – lived in Centre Island
- Wendy Liebman – grew up in East Hills
- Scott Lipsky (born 1981) – tennis player, born in Hempstead
- Peggy Lipton – raised in Lawrence
- Lindsay Lohan – her family resides in North Merrick
- Guy Lombardo – lived in Freeport
- Jennifer Lopez – had a home in Brookville, with Marc Anthony
- Susan Lucci – soap opera star grew up and still has a residence in Garden City
- Chuck Lorre – native of Plainview
- Lori Loughlin – raised in Oceanside
- Elliot S. Maggin – DC Comics writer lived in Merrick
- The Marx Brothers – lived in Great Neck
- Jackie Martling – grew up in Mineola
- Christopher Masterson and Danny Masterson are from East Williston
- John McEnroe – lived in Cove Neck
- Michael McKean – raised in Sea Cliff
- Kate McKinnon of Saturday Night Live – grew up in Sea Cliff
- Anne Meara – raised in Rockville Centre
- John Melendez – Stuttering John from Howard Stern show – from Massapequa
- Idina Menzel – from Syosset
- Method Man – lived in Hempstead
- Steve Madden – grew up in Lawrence
- Larry Miller – grew up in Valley Stream
- Harvey Milk – native of Woodmere and Hewlett
- MF Doom – lived in Long Beach
- Eddie Money lived in Levittown
- Les Moonves – grew up in Valley Stream
- Rita Moreno – lived in North Valley Stream
- Errol Morris – grew up in Hewlett
- Sterling Morrison – native of East Meadow
- John Moschitta Jr. – native of Uniondale
- Charlie Murphy – grew up in Roosevelt
- Eddie Murphy – grew up in Roosevelt
- Elliott Murphy – from Rockville Centre
- Billy Murray (singer) – lived in Freeport
- John Nolan (musician) – grew up in Rockville Centre
- Ole Olsen (comedian) – lived for a time in Malverne
- Momina Mustehsan – Pakistani singer, engineer; lives part-time in Nassau County
- Bill O'Reilly – resides in Plandome; grew up in Westbury
- Daryl Palumbo – lived in Bellmore
- Adam Pascal – lived in Woodbury
- Slim Jim Phantom – grew up in Massapequa
- Natalie Portman – actress, grew up in Syosset
- Gary Portnoy – lived in North Woodmere
- C.W. Post and his daughter Marjorie Merriweather Post lived in Brookville. Her daughter, actress Dina Merrill spent time there too
- Thomas Pynchon – born in Glen Cove and grew up in Oyster Bay
- pH-1 — singer and rapper, grew up on Long Island
- Prodigy (rapper) – native of Hempstead
- Sheryl Lee Ralph — graduated from Uniondale High School
- Lee Ranaldo – native of Glen Cove
- Lou Reed – Grew up in Freeport
- Busta Rhymes – from Uniondale
- Joel Rifkin – lived in East Meadow
- Theodore Roosevelt, 26th US president, lived on Oyster Bay during his presidency. His estate, Sagamore Hill, is now a US National Historic Site
- Eleanor Roosevelt and her father Elliott Roosevelt lived in Salisbury
- Jeff Rosenstock – from Baldwin
- Lonny Ross – native of Wantagh
- Bob Rozakis and Laurie Rozakis live in the town of Oyster Bay
- Rick Rubin – grew up in Lido Beach
- Scott Rudin – from Baldwin
- Chris Russo – from Syosset
- Telly Savalas – native of Garden City
- Shaggy – lives in Valley Stream
- Jerry Seinfeld – grew up in Massapequa
- Brian Setzer – grew up in Massapequa
- Amy Schumer – from Oceanside
- Adrienne Shelly – grew up in Jericho
- Kevin Shinick – native of Merrick
- Jamie-Lynn Sigler – native of Jericho
- Helen Slater – from Bethpage
- Elinor Smith – lived in Freeport
- Greg Smith (American musician) – grew up in Valley Stream
- Dee Snider – native of Baldwin
- Lara Spencer – native of Garden City
- Frank Springer – grew up in Malverne
- Howard Stern – grew up in Roosevelt
- Jim Steinman – native of Hewlett
- Laura Stevenson – lived in Rockville Centre
- Brandon Tartikoff - raised in Freeport
- Taz (wrestler) – lived in Massapequa
- John Tesh – native of Garden City
- Vinny Testaverde – grew up in Elmont
- LaMarcus Adna Thompson – lived in Glen Cove
- Louis Comfort Tiffany – lived in Laurel Hollow
- Moe Tucker – grew up in Levittown
- Reginald VelJohnson – lives in Oceanside
- Frank Viola – native of East Meadow
- James Watson – lives in Laurel Hallow
- Chris Weidman – Mixed martial artist and former middleweight champion in the UFC (honored with 'Chris Weidman Day' on July 17 in Nassau County)
- Leslie West – grew up in East Meadow and Lawrence
- Walt Whitman – lived in Hempstead
- Robin Wilson (musician) – lives in Valley Stream
- Paul Zaloom – native of Garden City
- Alan Zweibel – lived in Woodmere and Wantagh
- Levar Stoney – mayor of Richmond, Virginia; was born in Nassau County
- Madison Beer – born and raised in Jericho

== See also ==
- List of counties in New York
- List of Long Islanders
- Nassau County International Cricket Stadium
- Nassau County Police Department
- Nassau Inter-County Express
- National Register of Historic Places listings in Nassau County, New York
