= Francis T. Purcell =

American politician (1918–2014)

County Executive of Nassau County
- In office January 6, 1978 – January 16, 1987
- Preceded by: Ralph G. Caso
- Succeeded by: Thomas Gulotta

Personal details
- Born: August 11, 1918 Brooklyn, New York, U.S.
- Died: May 18, 2014 (aged 95) West Palm Beach, Florida, U.S.
- Party: Republican
- Spouse: Barbara Purcell

Francis Thomas Purcell (August 11, 1918 – May 18, 2014) was an American Republican politician who was county executive of Nassau County, New York (1978–87). He served as a trustee and also as mayor of the village of Malverne, was a member of the New York State Assembly, and supervisor of the town of Hempstead, New York, before becoming county executive in 1978. After resigning in 1987, Purcell became a political commentator for Cablevision's news channel News 12 Long Island. In 2004, a section of land formerly called Hempstead Plains was dedicated to Purcell in honor of his service and dedication to Nassau County.

== Early life ==
Purcell was born in 1918 to Thomas (d. 1942) and Annette (d. 1972) Purcell on 11 August 1918 in Brooklyn, New York. A star athlete at Malverne High School, he was signed to play baseball with the Brooklyn Dodgers but never played for them because he joined the army in 1941 and was discharged in 1945 with the rank of captain.

== Career ==
Purcell was elected mayor of Malverne in 1955. In June 1964, he challenged the party designee in the Republican Party primary for Nassau's 1st district's seat in the New York State Assembly and won the nomination. He was a member of the State Assembly in 1965. On June 18, he was appointed as supervisor of the town of Hempstead, to fill the vacancy created by the appointment of Ralph G. Caso as presiding supervisor. Purcell was elected to the position in November 1965, and then reelected twice.

He was elected to the post of county executive of Nassau County in 1977. He secured the nomination of the Republican Party over fellow Republican and incumbent county executive Ralph G. Caso, who also opposed Purcell in the general election. He took office in January 1978. In the late 1970s and '80s, Purcell promoted the development of downtown Nassau County businesses, and oversaw the transformation of Mitchel field, a former air base, into a recreational and educational center.

Purcell easily won reelection in 1981 and 1985. In December 1986, near the end of the first year of his third term, he announced his retirement from politics and his intention to join Cablevision as a political analyst and commentator.

== Personal ==
Purcell had 3 children, Patricia, Kim, and Diane, seven grandchildren, and eight great-grandchildren. He resided in West Palm Beach, Florida with his wife Barbara, where he died on May 18, 2014, aged 95.

New York State Assembly
Preceded by Anthony Barbiero	New York State Assembly; Nassau County, 1st District; 1965	Succeeded by district abolished
Political offices
Preceded by Ralph G. Caso	County Executive of Naasau County, New York; 1978–1987	Succeeded by Thomas Gulotta
