= 544 Oenoke Ridge =

Historic Tudor revival estate

Orchard's End Estate

General information
- Location: 544 Oenoke Ridge, New Caanan, CT, United States
- Coordinates: 41.1632°N 73.5104°W
- Year built: 1929
- Owner: Daniel Rotman

Height
- Architectural: Tudor-Jacobean

Technical details
- Floor area: 22,000 sq ft (2,000 m^{2})
- Grounds: 6.5 acres (2.6 ha)

Design and construction
- Architect: William B. Tubby

Other information
- Number of rooms: 35

544 Oenoke Ridge, also known as Orchard's End Estate, is a 25,000 sq ft (2,300 m^{2}) Tudor Great Estate located in New Canaan, Connecticut. Built in 1929 and designed by New York architect William B. Tubby, it is the largest home in New Caanan and set a record for the highest asking price for a private residence in its city history. Originally built by Taubman for the chief counsel of the Rockefeller family, previous residents include singer Mariah Carey and billionaire Carlos Hank. It is reported to be owned by entrepreneur Daniel Rotman.

== History ==
Built in 1929 during the great estates era, the late Gilded Age brick and limestone mansion is an example of architecture in the grand manner. A grand Tudor Revival estate with Jacobean detailing, the estate represents English Revival architecture in America during the early 1900s. Orchard's End commission required teams of artisans, stone carvers, plasterers, and bronze smiths to execute. Encompassing 25,000 sq ft (2,300 m^{2}) of interior space on 6.5 acres (2.6 ha) it is estimated to cost $50 million if it were to be rebuilt today. For his portfolio of work in Connecticut architect William B. Tubby designed 544 Oenoke Ridge, along with Waveny House which was listed on the National Register of Historic Places in 2019, and Dunnellen Hall in Greenwich.

Architect Dinyar Wadia was hired in 1999 and again in 2014 to undertake a $14.5 million expansion and renovation of the estate.

While living in Orchard's End Estate, Mariah Carey recorded her 2025 album Here for It All. Carey had a portion of the 100-year-old carriage house transformed in to a recording studio where she spent two years recording her album. In a video shared widely on social media, Carey can be seen singing her verse in Muni Long's 2024 song "Made for Me" while wandering around parts of the estate.

Orchard's End has seen extensive privacy and security installations over the years. The estate has two 15 ft (4.6 m) high wrought iron front and rear entrance gates. In addition to the alarm system throughout the home, Carey had a dozen indoor and outdoor security cameras installed throughout the property, and used the guest cottage to house her security team. When President Biden visited the estate an advance team of Secret Service agents worked with state and local law enforcement to jointly implement the necessary security measures for the visit. In the 1980s, former resident billionaire Carlos Hank built a 9 ft (2.7 m) high, 2 ft (0.61 m) thick, 1,500 ft (460 m) long dry stone wall along the estate's perimeter for extensive privacy, a feature grandfathered in that if desired today local zoning would not permit. At the time of the fieldstone wall's completion it was the longest dry stone wall in the United States.

== Public events ==
The estate has hosted multiple charitable and fundraising events. During the 2020 presidential election, then-vice president Joe Biden held a fundraiser at the home for his campaign.
