= William Tubby =

American architect (1858–1944)

William Bunker Tubby
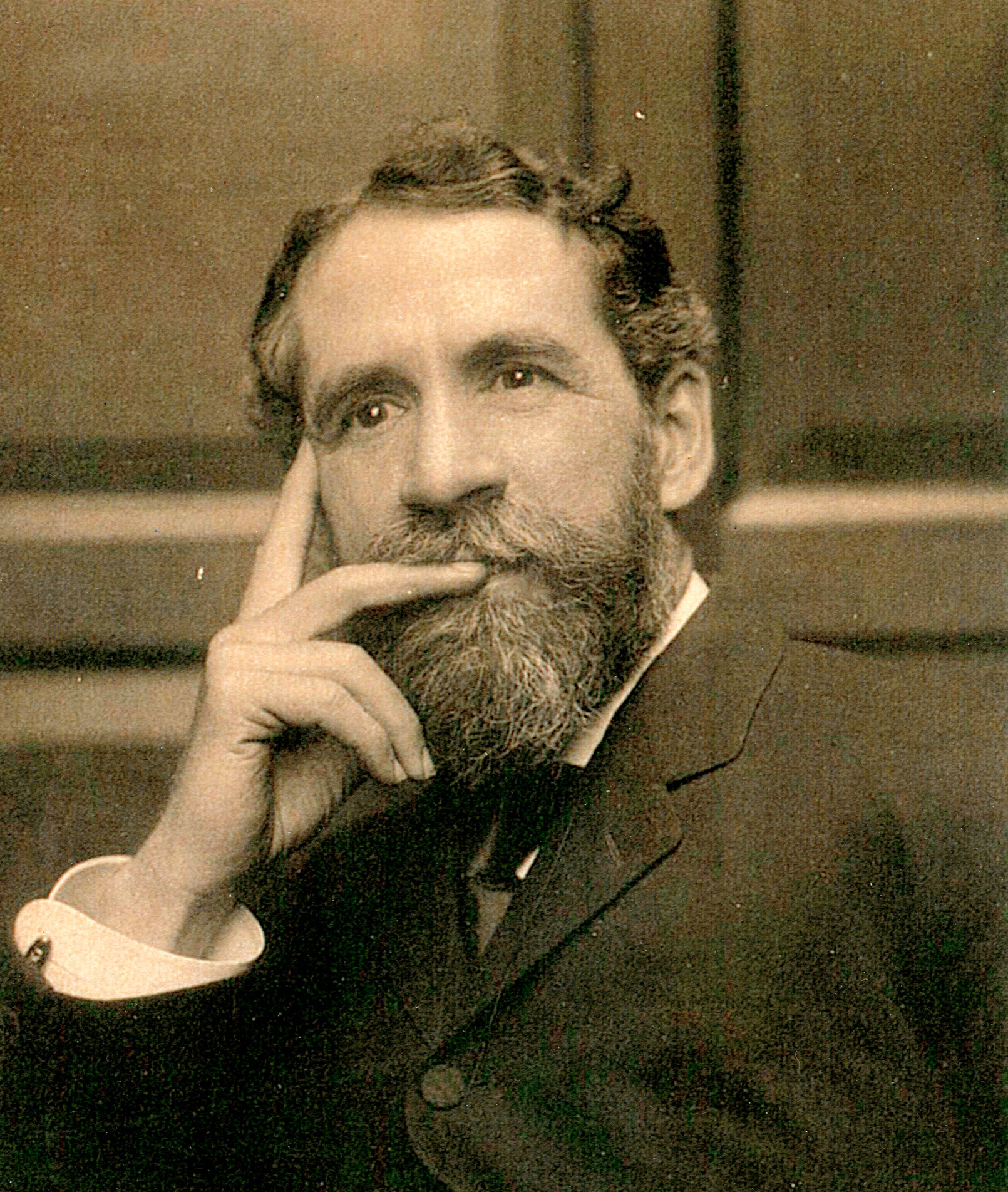
- William Bunker Tubby
- Born: 1858; Des Moines, Iowa
- Died: 1944 (aged 85–86)
- Occupation: Architect
- Known for: Pratt family residences, Pratt Institute Library, Old Nassau County Courthouse

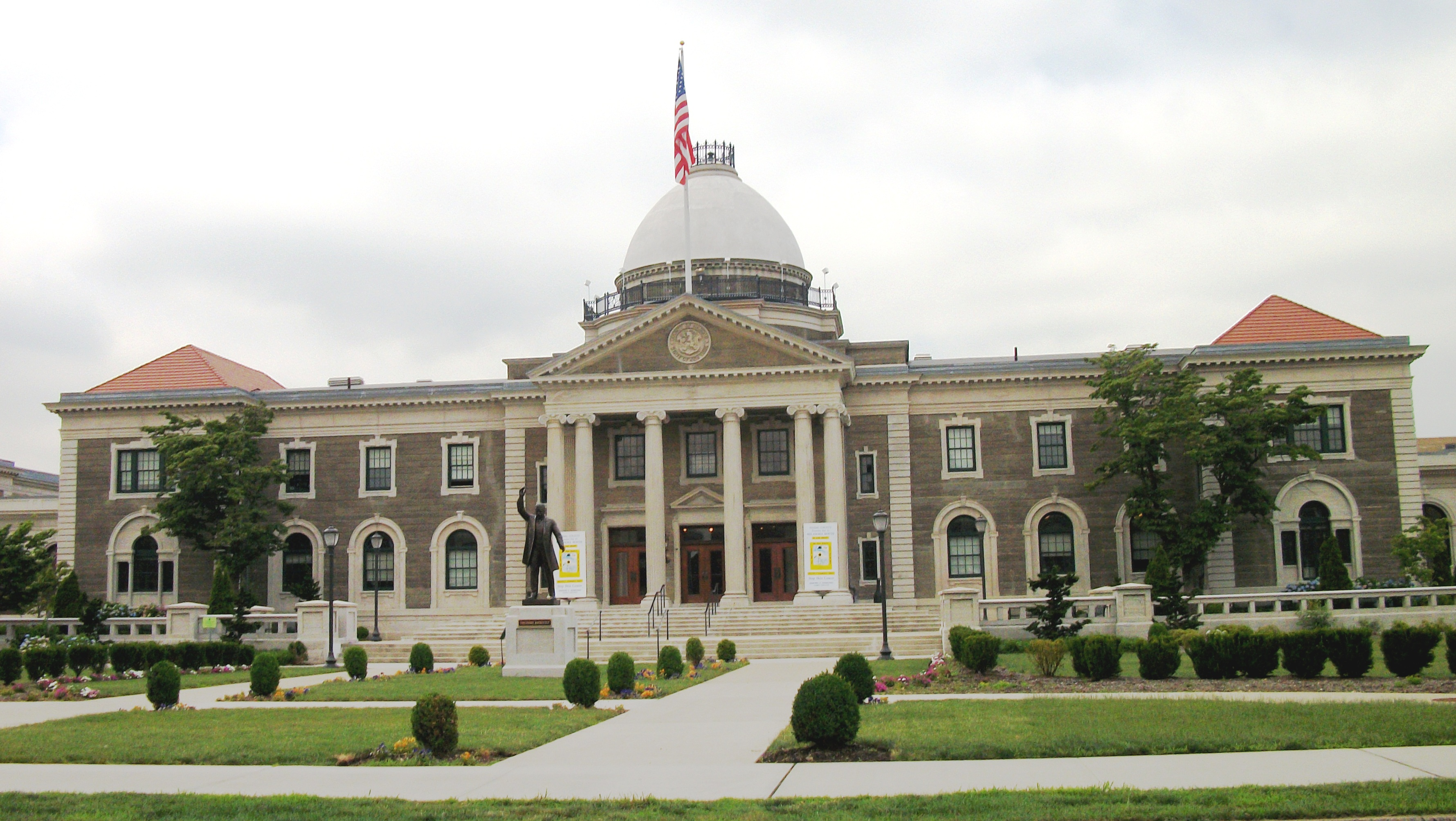
Old Nassau County Courthouse

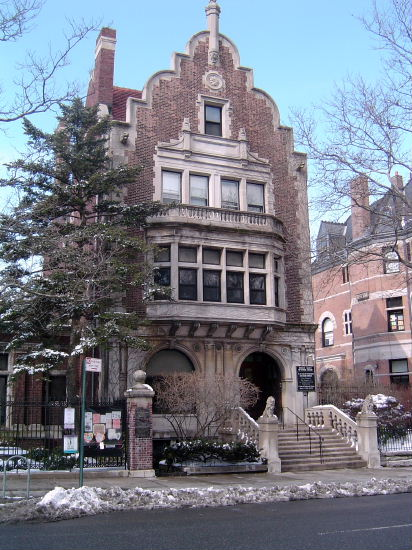
House designed by Tubby for William H. Childs (inventor of Bon Ami Cleaning Powder) on Prospect Park West in Brooklyn New York. Now an Ethical Culture Society building.

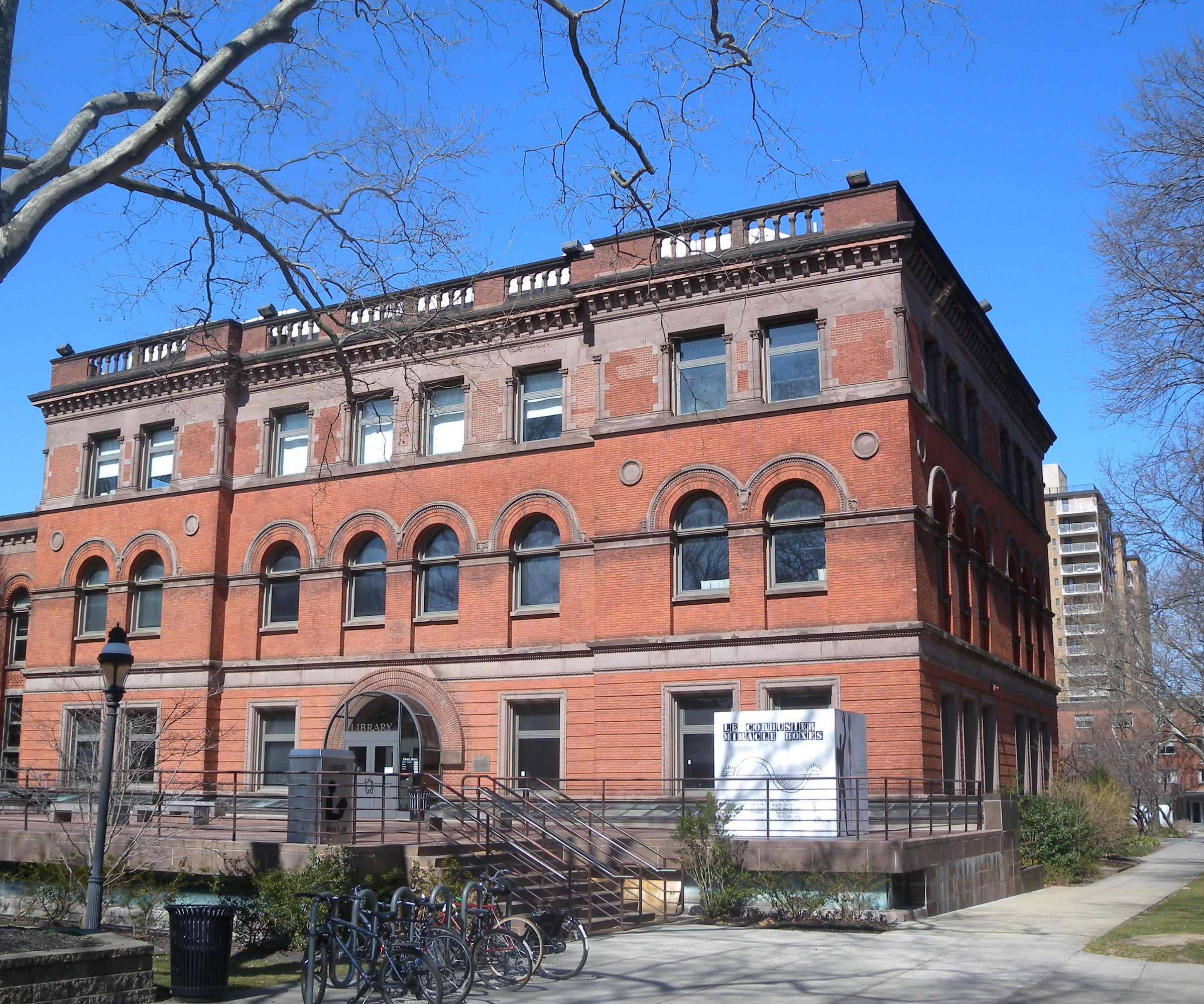
Pratt Institute's Library

William Bunker Tubby (21 August 1858 – 1944) was an American architect who was particularly notable for his work in New York City.

Tubby was born in Des Moines, Iowa, and graduated from Brooklyn Polytechnic Institute in 1875. He worked in the architectural offices of Ebenezer L. Roberts until beginning his own firm in 1883. Continuing this practice until his retirement in 1942, Tubby became a major New York architect. He created important buildings in a variety of styles, and was especially known for his Romanesque and Dutch Revival-style designs.

The house that Tubby designed for Charles Millard Pratt at 241 Clinton Avenue (1893, located in Brooklyn's Clinton Hill Historic District) is one of the city's finest examples of Romanesque Revival architecture. His creativity and expertise can also be seen in several other Brooklyn homes: the neo-Jacobean Brooklyn Society for Ethical Culture Meeting House, the Romanesque Revival style home at 234 Lincoln Place, the Queen Anne style row at 864-872 Carroll Street, the residences of Brooklyn mayors at 405 Clinton Avenue, and the Dutch Revival house at 43 Willow Street, which Tubby himself occupied.

His institutional designs include Pratt Institute's Student Union from 1887, the Romanesque Revival style South Hall for Pratt Institute in 1892 (designated New York City Landmark), the Renaissance Revival style library building for the Pratt Institute (1896, a designated New York City Landmark), the Romanesque Revival style 83rd Police Precinct House in Brooklyn (1894–95), a designated New York Landmark) and the Flemish Revival style Wallabout Market (demolished) which was once the second-largest market in the world. As a member of the Architects' Advisory Commission for the Brooklyn Carnegie Libraries, Tubby designed five library buildings.

Outside of New York City, Tubby created designs for banks, churches, libraries, hospitals and large estates throughout the Northeast, including Waveny House and Orchard's End Estate in New Canaan, Connecticut, and Dunnellen Hall in Greenwich, Connecticut. The Roslyn National Bank and Trust Company Building at Roslyn, New York, was built in 1931.

Tubby lived in Brooklyn Heights at 43 Willow Street before retiring to Greenwich in his later life. A member of the Brooklyn Guild Association, he taught architecture at the Brooklyn Polytechnic Institute.

== List of works ==
The following table presents an incomplete list of buildings designed by William Tubby, focusing on those that are extant or for which there is adequate documentation of their style. Note that most addresses link to Google Street View images of the buildings.

Name	Completed	Style	Image	Address (Google Maps link)	Location	Original use	Present use	Designations and references
124 Willow Street House	1885	Eclectic-Flemish Renaissance Revival		124 Willow St.	Brooklyn, NY	1831 townhouse remodeled by Tubby	Private residence	Brooklyn Heights Historic District
864-872 Carroll Street houses	1887	Queen Anne		864-872 Carroll Street	Brooklyn, NY	Private residence	Private residence	Park Slope Historic District
286A-290 Vanderbilt Ave. houses	1889	Romanesque Revival		286A-290 Vanderbilt Ave.	Brooklyn, NY	Private residence	Private residence	Fort Greene Historic District
234 Lincoln Place House	1889	Romanesque Revival		234 Lincoln Place	Brooklyn, NY	Private residence	Private residence	Park Slope Historic District
Charles A. Schieren House	1889	Romanesque Revival/Queen Anne		405 Clinton Ave.	Brooklyn, NY	Private residence	Private residence	Clinton Hill Historic District
William B. Tubby House	1890?	Dutch Colonial Revival		43 Willow St.	Brooklyn, NY	Private residence	Private residence	Brooklyn Heights Historic District
Pratt Institute South Hall	1891	Renaissance Revival		215 Ryerson Street	Brooklyn, NY	High school	University	NYC Landmark
1-15 Adams Street Factory	1891	Romanesque Revival		2 John St.	Brooklyn, NY	Factory	Industrial	DUMBO Historic District
179-183 St. James Place houses	1892	Romanesque Revival/Queen Anne		179-183 St. James Place	Brooklyn, NY	Private residence	Private residence	Clinton Hill Historic District
Charles Millard Pratt House	1893	Romanesque Revival		241 Clinton Ave.	Brooklyn, NY	Private residence	Brooklyn RC archbishop's residence	Clinton Hill Historic District
Charles Millard Pratt's Carriage House	1893?	Romanesque Revival		261 Vanderbilt Avenue	Brooklyn, NY	Carriage house	Apartments	None
John Thatcher House	1894	French Renaissance Revival		674 10th St.	Brooklyn, NY	Private residence	Private residence	Park Slope Historic District
129-135 Cambridge Place houses	1894	Queen Anne		129-135 Cambridge Place	Brooklyn, NY	Private residence	Private residence	Clinton Hill Historic District
83rd Precinct Police Station and Stable	1894	Romanesque Revival		179 Wilson Avenue	Brooklyn, NY	Police precinct	Police precinct	NYC Landmark, National Register of Historic Places
50-52 Bridge Street Factory	1895	American Round Arch		50 Bridge Street	Brooklyn, NY	Factory	Residential/commercial	DUMBO Historic District
Wallabout Market	1896	Dutch Colonial Revival		219 Flushing Avenue	Brooklyn, NY	Wholesale market	Demolished 1941 to build Navy Yard	None
Pratt Institute Library	1896	Renaissance Revival		224-228 Ryerson Street	Brooklyn, NY	University	University	NYC Landmark
American Thread Building	1896	Renaissance Revival		260 West Broadway	New York, NY	Warehouse	Residential lofts	National Register of Historic Places
Old Jamaica High School	1897	Dutch Colonial Revival		162-02 Hillside Ave.	Jamaica, NY	Public school	Public school	NYC Landmark
194-200 Court Street apartment houses	1898	Renaissance Revival		194-200 Court Street	Brooklyn, NY	Apartments & Retail	Apartments/retail	Cobble Hill Historic District
Maxwelton (estate)	1898?		Water tower	3 Whitney Circle	Glen Cove, NY	Stable for estate	Only water tower from stable designed by Tubby is extant on residential property	None
Old Nassau County Courthouse	1901	Classical Revival		1550 Franklin Ave.	Garden City, NY	Government	Government	National Register of Historic Places
William H. Childs House	1901	Neo-Jacobean		53 Prospect Park West	Brooklyn, NY	Private residence	Brooklyn Society for Ethical Culture	Park Slope Historic District
Old Brooklyn Friends School	1902	Classical Revival		112 Schermerhorn St.	Brooklyn, NY	Private school	Public school	National Register of Historic Places
187-195 Waverly Ave. garages	1904			187-195 Waverly Ave.	Brooklyn, NY	Garages	Private residence	None
DeKalb Library	1905	Classical Revival		790 Bushwick Avenue	Brooklyn, NY	Library	Library	NYC Landmark
Leonard Library	1908	Classical Revival		81 Devoe St.	Brooklyn, NY	Library	Library	None
231-233 Front Street Factory	1908	Commercial		231 Front Street	Brooklyn, NY	Factory	Commercial	Vinegar Hill Historic District
Ernest G. Draper House	1910	Italian Provincial Revival		61 Prospect Park West	Brooklyn, NY	Private residence	Private residence	Park Slope Historic District
Waveny House	1912	Tudor Revival		677 South Avenue	New Canaan, CT	Private residence	Municipally owned event venue	None
Stone Avenue Library	1914	Neo-Jacobean		581 Mother Gaston Boulevard	Brooklyn, NY	Public library	Public library	None
Dunnellen Hall	1918	Neo-Jacobean		521 Round Hill Road	Greenwich, CT	Private residence	Private residence	None
William Tubby Jr. Residence	1918?				Greenwich, CT	Private residence	Precise location and status of this work is not known	None
Orchard's End Estate	1929	Tudor Revival		544 Oenoke Ridge	New Canaan, CT	Private residence	Private residence	None
Roslyn National Bank and Trust Company Building	1931	Classical Revival			Roslyn, NY	Bank	Retail	National Register of Historic Places
