= Daniel G. Reid =

American industrialist, financier and philanthropist

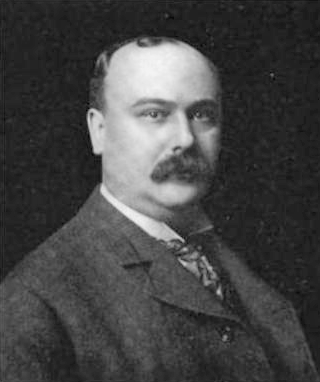
- A 1900 portrait of Reid
- Born: August 1, 1858; Richmond, Indiana, U.S.
- Died: January 17, 1925 (aged 66); New York City, New York, U.S.
- Resting place: Richmond, Indiana, U.S.
- Occupations: Industrialist, financier, philanthropist
- Spouse(s): Ella C. Dunn (1880–1899), Clarisse Agnew (1900–1904), Margaret M. Carrere (1906–1920)
- Children: 2

Daniel Gray Reid (August 1, 1858 – January 17, 1925) was an American industrialist, financier, and philanthropist. Early in his career he manufactured tin plate with The American Tin Plate Company, and later U.S. Steel. He was known as the "Tinplate King".

== Early life and education ==
A native of Richmond, Indiana, Reid was the son of Scotch-Irish Americans Daniel and Anna (née Dougan) Reid and was educated in the public schools of Richmond. His father died when he was 15 years old and he was reared by his mother.

== Career ==
At the age of seventeen, he entered the Second National Bank as messenger boy, obtained his business training there and gradually won promotion until he was made teller, which position he resigned in 1895. In 1892, he became interested in The American Tin Plate Company, owners of an extensive plant at Elwood, Indiana. He and his partner, William B. Leeds, another Richmond native, bought the tin plate mill, with which he eventually combined every tin plate company in the country to form The American Tin Plate Company, with Reid as president. In 1901, J. P. Morgan included the tinplate trust in the giant steel trust, United States Steel Corporation, and reportedly paid $18 million for the company, and Reid became the director. He bought control of the American Can Company and the Chicago, Rock Island & Pacific Railroad. In 1912, he organized the Tobacco Products Corporation with Henry Clay Frick, John D. Ryan and others.

After the formation of U.S. Steel, he moved to New York City and had a mansion on 5th Avenue complete with three-story stable for his horses. Private stables were normally two stories tall with the ground floor housing the horses and vehicles while upstairs were rooms for servants. Reid's was to be bigger and grander. He commissioned mansion architect C. P. H. Gilbert, who was responsible for Isaac Fletcher and F. W. Woolworth mansions, to design his palace for horses.

In 1901, three brownstone residences built just after the Civil War were demolished to make way for Reid's new building. Completed in 1902, the granite-faced structure stretched 58-feet wide at No. 170 East 70th Street. Sitting imposingly behind an iron fence with heavy masonry posts, it was entered through a grand arched span with sliding oak doors that disappeared into the wall. Crowning its third story was a carved stone cornice and balustrade.

The new carriage house could accommodate 14 vehicles on the first floor. Grooms, coachmen and other related servants were housed on the top floor. The second floor held the tack room and stalls for 16 horses that were led up and down a ramp from below. Setting the elaborate carriage house even further apart from its more typical neighbors were the bowling alley and billiard room below ground. The completed structure cost Reid a staggering $95,000. He also had a country estate in Irvington, New York, and a 200-foot yacht Rheclair. The yacht held a crew of 35, boasted ten staterooms and was 213 feet long.

In 1918, Reid built for his daughter the Jacobean-style mansion Dunnellen Hall. Dunnellen Hall was built for approximately $6 million. The approximately 23,000-square-foot mansion originally sat on over 200 acres, but is currently situated on just over 40. It was purchased in 1983 by Leona Helmsley and her husband Harry for US$11 million.

== Personal life ==
On October 13, 1880, Reid married Ella C. Dunn, of Richmond, Indiana. Ella Dunn Reid died on June 25, 1899, in Chicago. His daughter Rhea married Henry J. Topping, the son of Republic Iron and Steel president, John A. Topping.

Reid married two more times after her death. In 1900, he married actress Clarisse Agnew, whom The New York Times labeled “a theatrical beauty.” They moved with his daughter into a mansion on Fifth Avenue across from Central Park, where the needs of family were taken care of by 20 live-in servants. She died in 1904.

In 1906, he married former actress Margaret M. Carrere (stage name Mabel Carrier), who had appeared in The Chinese Honeymoon, The Runaways and West Point Cadet. Reid filed for divorce in New York in May 1919 on grounds of infidelity. Later, Reid abandoned the charges but his wife filed a counterclaim against him and won. They were divorced in February 1920.

Reid's grandson, Daniel Reid Topping, was part owner and president of the New York Yankees baseball team from 1945 to 1964.

== Health decline ==
Reid's health began to decline in 1919. Twice, in 1921 and 1922, he was treated in the psychiatric clinic at Johns Hopkins Hospital in Baltimore. He tried repeatedly to restore his health, traveling by private car in January 1923 to Florida with three physicians, four nurses, and a private secretary. In 1924, he visited a spa in Germany, taking along his barber, a valet, one doctor, four nurses, and a secretary. The attempts at a cure proved unsuccessful, however.

=== Death ===
Reid died on January 16, 1925, in his apartment in New York City at age 66. His body was brought back to Richmond, Indiana, where he was laid to rest in Earlham Cemetery with his mother, wife, and son. At the time of his death, he was a director of the American Can Company, Bankers Trust, Chase Securities Corporation, Lehigh Valley Railroad, Metal and Thermit Corporation, and a trustee of the American Surety Company of New York.

== Legacy ==
Reid left a great deal of money to build and support institutions in Richmond, Indiana, including the YMCA, the Art Association of Richmond, Earlham College, Reid Memorial Presbyterian Church, and Reid Hospital and Health Care Services, each of which are named in memory of his family for the significant gifts he made to both institutions.

He learned of the need to replace St. Stephen's Hospital, which had only 10 beds and was turning away about 50 patients a week. William B. Leeds, Reid's partner in business ventures and also a former Richmond resident contributed $10,000. An additional $10,000 was donated from the estate of Robert Morrisson and $5,000 from James M. Starr's estate. Reid contributed the balance, about $130,000. He purchased 50 acres on the city's north side for $30,000 and donated $100,000 for the building of Reid Hospital in honor of his wife, Ella and their son, Frank. He also donated $295,000 for the building of Reid Memorial Presbyterian Church in honor of his parents. Cornerstones for both the hospital and Reid Memorial Presbyterian Church were laid Sept. 24, 1904. Reid Memorial was dedicated July 27, 1905.
