= Alicia Cervera =

Peruvian-American businesswoman

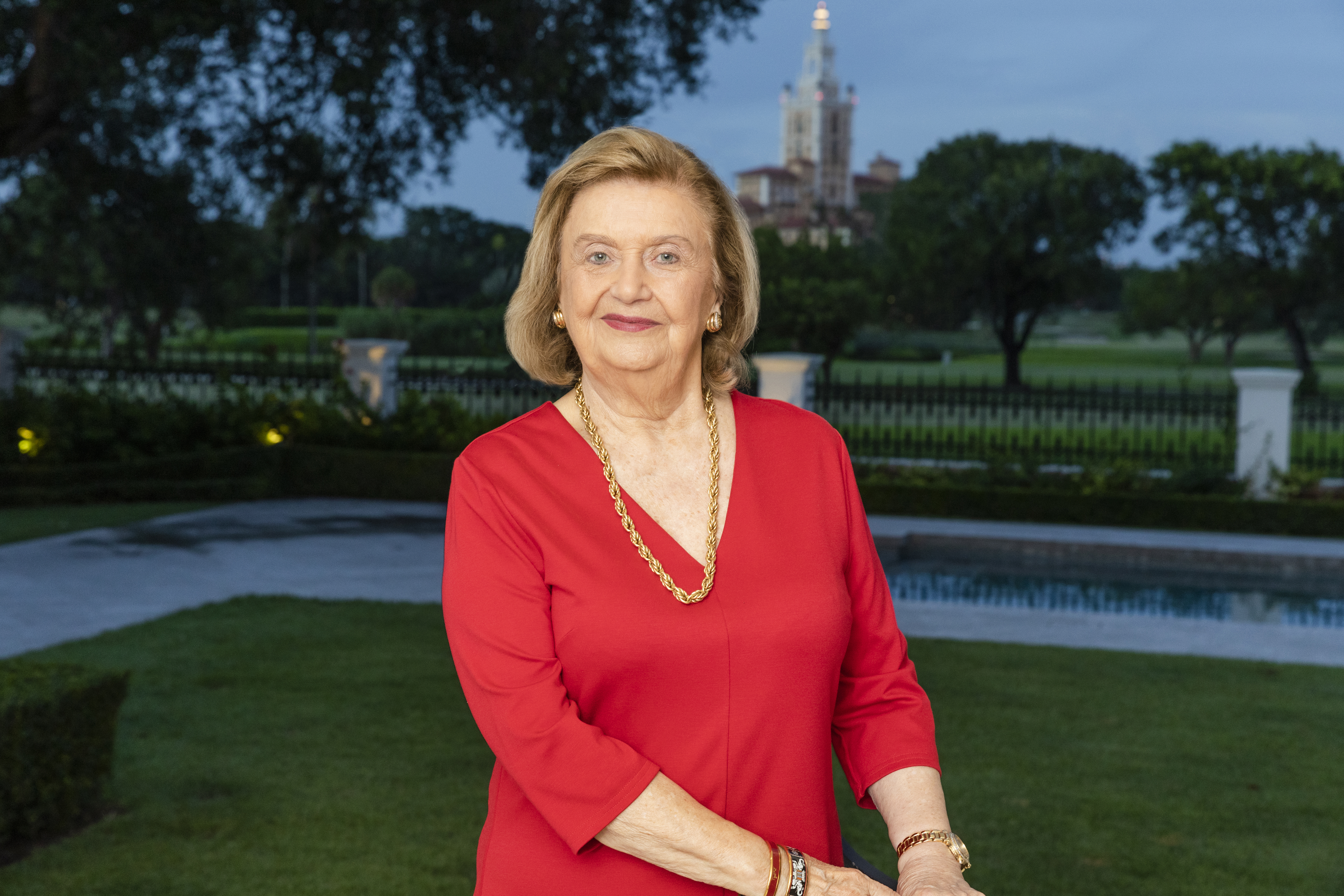
- Alicia Cervera Portrait
- Born: March 14, 1930 (age 95); Lima, Peru
- Occupation(s): Founder and chairman of Cervera Real Estate; Entrepreneur; Philanthropist
- Spouse: Javier Cervera (dec.)
- Children: Veronica Cervera Goeseke; Alicia Cervera Lamadrid; Javier Cervera Jr.

Alicia Cervera (born March 14, 1930) is a Peruvian-American businesswoman, real estate broker and philanthropist known for her work as the founder and chairman of Cervera Real Estate, a real estate brokerage firm headquartered in Miami, Florida. Cervera has worked alongside notable developers including Harry Helmsley and Jorge M. Perez. She has been compared to Julia Tuttle as one of the women whose impact on the development of Miami has been the most prolific.

== Early life ==
Born in Peru in 1930, Cervera is the second of three daughters of Teodosio Cabada, a Peruvian ambassador, and Alicia Cipriani, a real estate developer in her hometown of Lima. In 1954, while her father was the Peruvian ambassador to Cuba, she married Javier Cervera, whose family business was centered in the Cuban sugar industry. She emigrated to Miami with her husband and their two daughters in the early 1960s, seeking safety in the United States from the Cuban Communist Revolution.

In 1966, Cervera learned of the transformation of Brickell Avenue in Miami from single-family lots to multifamily development. She then pursued and purchased (and later flipped) a property on Brickell Avenue, a move that would kickstart her real estate career.

== Career ==
In 1979, she approached New York real estate developer Harry Helmsley with a proposal to exclusively represent his planned 254-unit Palace on Brickell. She is credited for helping the present-day model of development sales and marketing."

Within one year of the Palace high-rise, Cervera secured several other major jobs on Brickell Avenue, including The Atlantis (known for its appearance in the opening credits of Miami Vice), Villa Regina and Bristol Towers. As of 2023, Cervera has represented and sold more than 30 residential high-rise condominium towers in Brickell. She worked with developers to help revitalize neighborhoods such as Miami Beach's South of Fifth, downtown Miami, Coconut Grove, and Edgewater.

Between 1969 and 2023, Cervera's career in new development sales and marketing included more than 120 condominium high-rise towers represented and sold across South Florida. Among these, include: Aston Martin Residences Miami (downtown Miami), Apogee (South Beach), the Ritz Carlton Coconut Grove, St. Regis Bal Harbour, and Grove at Grand Bay (Coconut Grove).

Cervera has been a supporter of the American Red Cross and the Adrienne Arsht Center for the Performing Arts. For the last 40 years, she has been President of Clinica San Juan de Dios Miami Foundation, a hospital for disabled children in her native Peru.

== Awards and recognition ==
Cervera has been referred to in the press as the "Grand Lady of Real Estate Sales" and the "Queen of Brickell." Her contributions to Miami's growth and development have earned her various accolades, including:

- 1991: recognized in the Congressional Record for her achievements in real estate
- 2001: received the Red Cross Spectrum Entrepreneurial Award
- 2006: CAMACOL recognized Cervera as a Successful Hispanic Businesswoman of the Year
- 2009: Realtor Association of Miami and the Beaches granted Cervera the "Miami Real Estate Icon Award"
- 2013: presented with a South Florida Real Estate Achievement and Leaders Award by the Greater Miami Chamber of Commerce
- 2014: Cervera received several recognitions:
  - South Florida Executive Magazine recognized her as a "Legend" for her dedication and commitment to the South Florida community.
  - The Miami Master Brokers' Forum "Legacy Award" for her dedication to excellence in business and impact on South Florida real estate.
  - The American Cancer Society Award for Inner Circle of 12.
- 2016: Miami Dade County Mayor Tomás Regalado proclaimed October 18 "Alicia Cervera Day", stating that "no woman other than Julia Tuttle has had a larger impact on the development of Miami than Alicia Cervera."
- 2022: Miami-Dade County dedicated a stretch of South Miami Avenue as "Alicia Cervera Way" in recognition of her efforts to revitalize existing neighborhoods and create new ones.
- 2023: honored with the South Florida Business Journal's Lifetime Achievement Award, in recognition of her influence and dedication to the real estate industry. Speaking about Cervera's recognition, City of Miami Mayor Francis Suarez said "I don't know what Miami would look like, I don't know what my job as mayor would be without the achievements Alicia gave to our community."
- 2023: bestowed with the "Urban Warrior: Legacy Award" by Miami's Center for Architecture and Design for her dedication to the development of Miami's urban core into a vibrant cosmopolitan center.
