= Atlantis Condominium =

Condominium in Miami, Florida

Coordinates: 25.752971°N 80.198641°W

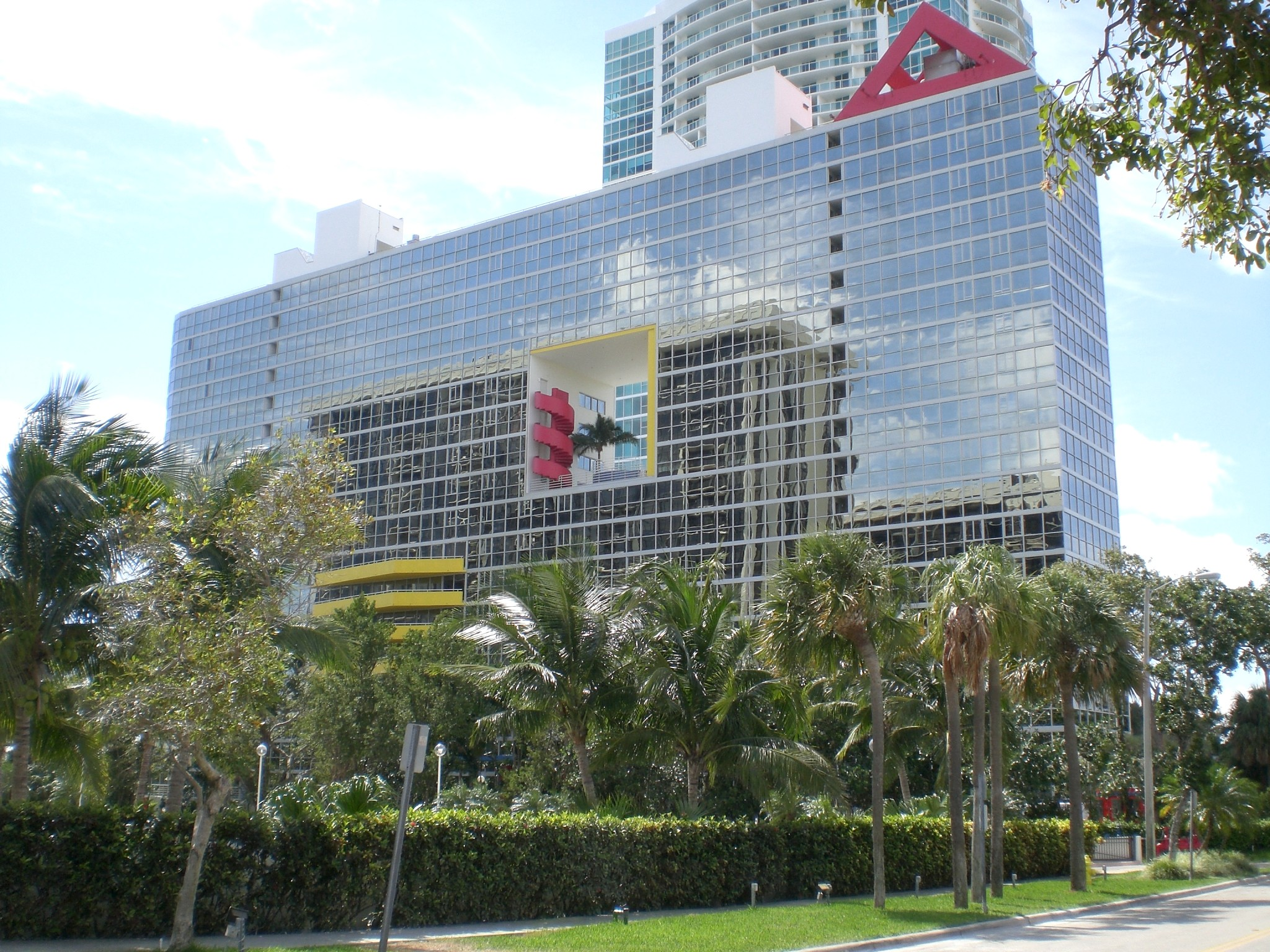
- Atlantis Condominium on Brickell Avenue
- Interactive map of the Atlantis Condominium area

General information
- Status: Completed
- Location: Miami, Florida, 2025 Brickell Avenue
- Construction started: 1980
- Completed: 1982

Height
- Height: 223 feet (68 m)

Technical details
- Floor count: 20

Design and construction
- Architect: Arquitectonica

The Atlantis Condominium is a landmark 20-story luxury condominium building in Miami, Florida. It was built between 1980 and 1982 and was designed by the architect Hervin Romney and architectural firm Arquitectonica. The building was exclusively represented and sold by Alicia Cervera of Cervera Real Estate. It is known for its glass facade and primary color scheme and the 5-story palm court which is cut out of the building. The palm court features a red spiral staircase, a hot tub, and a palm tree. The Atlantis was featured on the opening credits of the television series Miami Vice, and used as an exterior filming set in two episodes. The building has 96 units and is located at 2025 Brickell Avenue. This building is an icon to the Miami skyline. On April 18, 2012, the AIA's Florida Chapter placed Atlantis on its list of Florida Architecture: 100 Years. 100 Places.

== Popular culture ==
- Featured in the opening credits of Miami Vice, the building achieved national fame where it was featured as a set.
- It was featured briefly in Scarface for exterior shots of where Frank Lopez (Robert Loggia) lived (interior shots were done elsewhere).
- It was featured on the Telemundo soap opera Marielena.
- A building with a square cut in it is present in a fictional Vice City in the video game Grand Theft Auto: Vice City, which bears clear reference to the Atlantis Condominium.
- It appears as a buildable landmark in city building game Sim City 3000.
