= 83rd Precinct Police Station =

- 83rd Precinct Police Station and Stable
- U.S. National Register of Historic Places
- New York State Register of Historic Places
- New York City Landmark
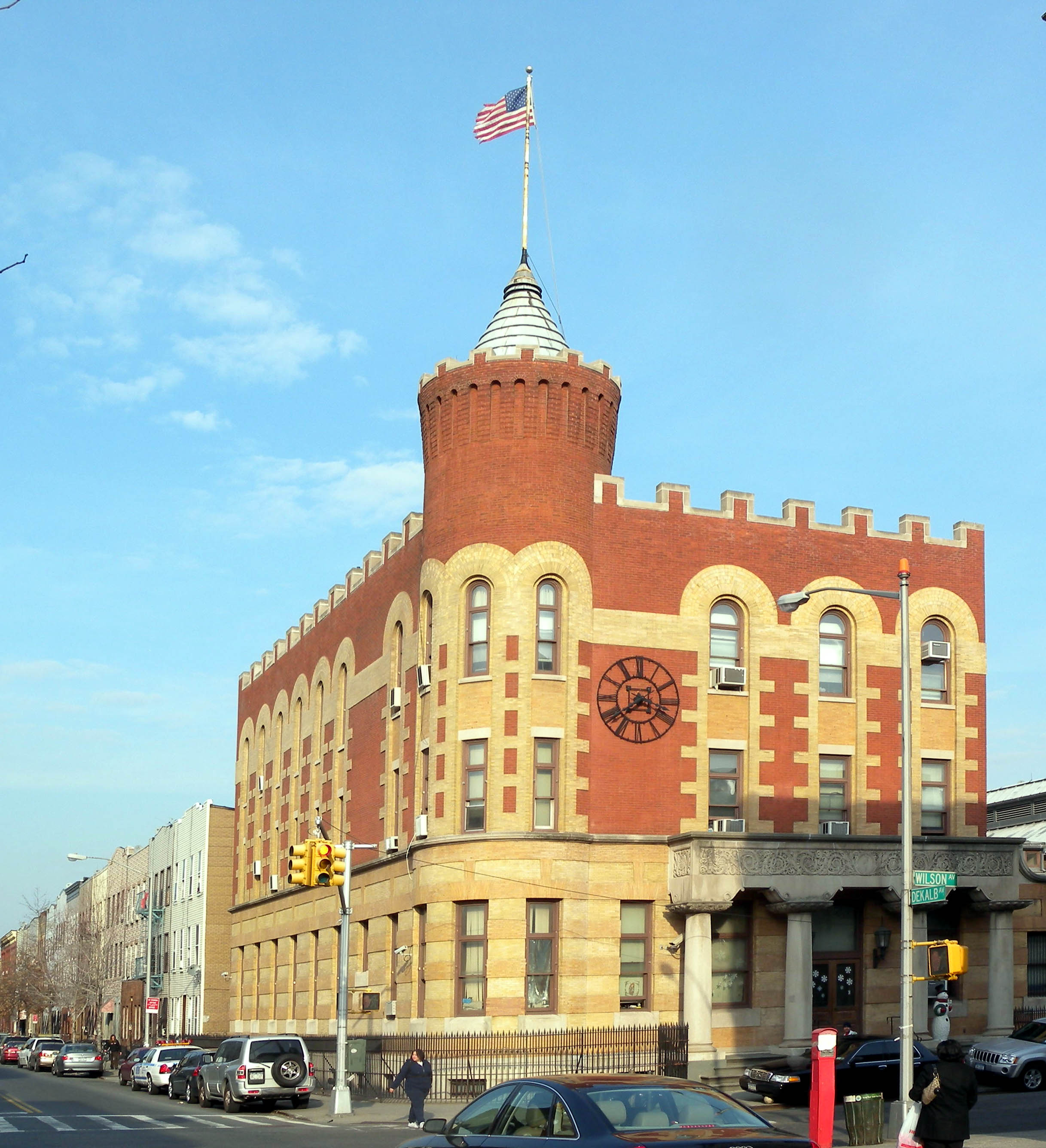

- Location within New York City Location within New York Location within the United States
- Location: 179 Wilson Avenue, Brooklyn, New York, US
- Coordinates: 40°42′6″N 73°55′25″W
- Area: less than one acre
- Built: 1894
- Architect: William Tubby
- Architectural style: Romanesque, Romanesque Revival
- NRHP reference No.: 82003360
- NYSRHP No.: 04701.001610
- NYCL No.: 0951

Significant dates
- Added to NRHP: April 14, 1982
- Designated NYSRHP: February 10, 1982
- Designated NYCL: March 8, 1977

The 83rd Precinct Police Station and Stable (also known as the 20th Precinct Police Station and Stable) is a historic police station and stable located at the corner of DeKalb and Wilson Avenues in Bushwick, Brooklyn, New York City. It was built in 1894 in the Romanesque Revival style to a design by William Tubby.

It was designated a landmark by the New York City Landmarks Preservation Commission in 1977, and was listed on the National Register of Historic Places in 1982. It currently houses NYPD Patrol Borough Brooklyn North.
