= Clarisse Agnew =

American actress

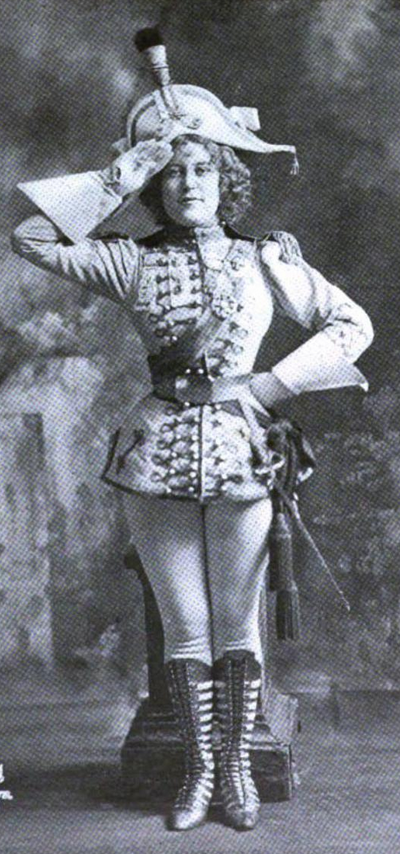
- Clarisse Agnew, from an 1898 publication
- Born: Clarice Robinson; 1876; Belvedere, Marin County, California
- Died: November 29, 1904 (aged 27–28); Irvington, New York
- Other names: Clarisse Reid, Clarissa Agnew
- Occupation: Actress
- Spouse: Daniel G. Reid

Clarisse Agnew (1876 – November 29, 1904), born Clarice Adele Robinson, was an American actress and chorus girl. She appeared on Broadway in the 1890s, and was the second wife of industrialist Daniel G. Reid.

== Early life ==
Clarice Robinson was born in Belvedere, in Marin County, California, the daughter of M. A. Robinson; her father was a hotelkeeper. Her stage career began in San Francisco when she was a teenager, but she soon moved to New York.

== Career ==
Agnew appeared as a "saucy and graceful soubrette" toured nationally in Charles H. Hoyt's shows A Milk White Flag and A Day and a Night in New York, and performed with Ethel Barrymore in Cousin Kate. Fellow actress Belle Livingstone recalled her as "the gayest of comediennes". She was photographed with a bicycle for an 1897 magazine feature on American actresses and cycling. Her marriage in 1900 was seen as part of a trend of showgirls finding wealthy husbands.

== Personal life ==
Agnew was named as a co-respondent in a divorce case in 1900. She married wealthy widower Daniel G. Reid in 1900. She died in 1904, in Irvington, New York, from complications during surgery "for the removal of a tumor". She was 27 years old.
