= Harry Helmsley =

American businessman (1909–1997)

Harry Brakmann Helmsley
- Born: March 4, 1909; New York City, U.S.
- Died: January 4, 1997 (aged 87); Scottsdale, Arizona, U.S.
- Occupation: Real estate developer
- Spouse(s): Eve Ella Sherpick Green (divorced) Leona Rosenthal Roberts (m. 1972)

Harry Brakmann Helmsley (March 4, 1909 – January 4, 1997) was an American real estate billionaire whose company, Helmsley-Spear, became one of the country's biggest property holders, owning the Empire State Building, the Helmsley Building (230 Park Avenue), the Graybar Building (420 Lexington Avenue), the Flatiron Building, and some of New York's most noted hotels. His second marriage to Leona Roberts ("Queen of Mean") led to charges of false accounting and tax evasion as well as a celebrated trial, where Harry was judged too frail to plead, but Leona was fined and jailed.

== Early career ==
Harry Helmsley was the son of Henry Helmsley, a wholesale dry goods buyer, and the former Minnie Brakmann. He was born in Manhattan and brought up in The Bronx, attending Evander Childs High School, where he did not graduate. The family could not afford a college education, but his grandfather got him a job as an office boy in a real estate firm, Dwight, Voorhis & Perry, where he showed a keen talent for the business and was made a partner. In 1938, he bought the firm, renaming it Dwight, Voorhis & Helmsley. In the early stages of his career, his portfolio consisted mainly of smaller properties in less-affluent parts of New York City, though it was extensive and highly profitable.

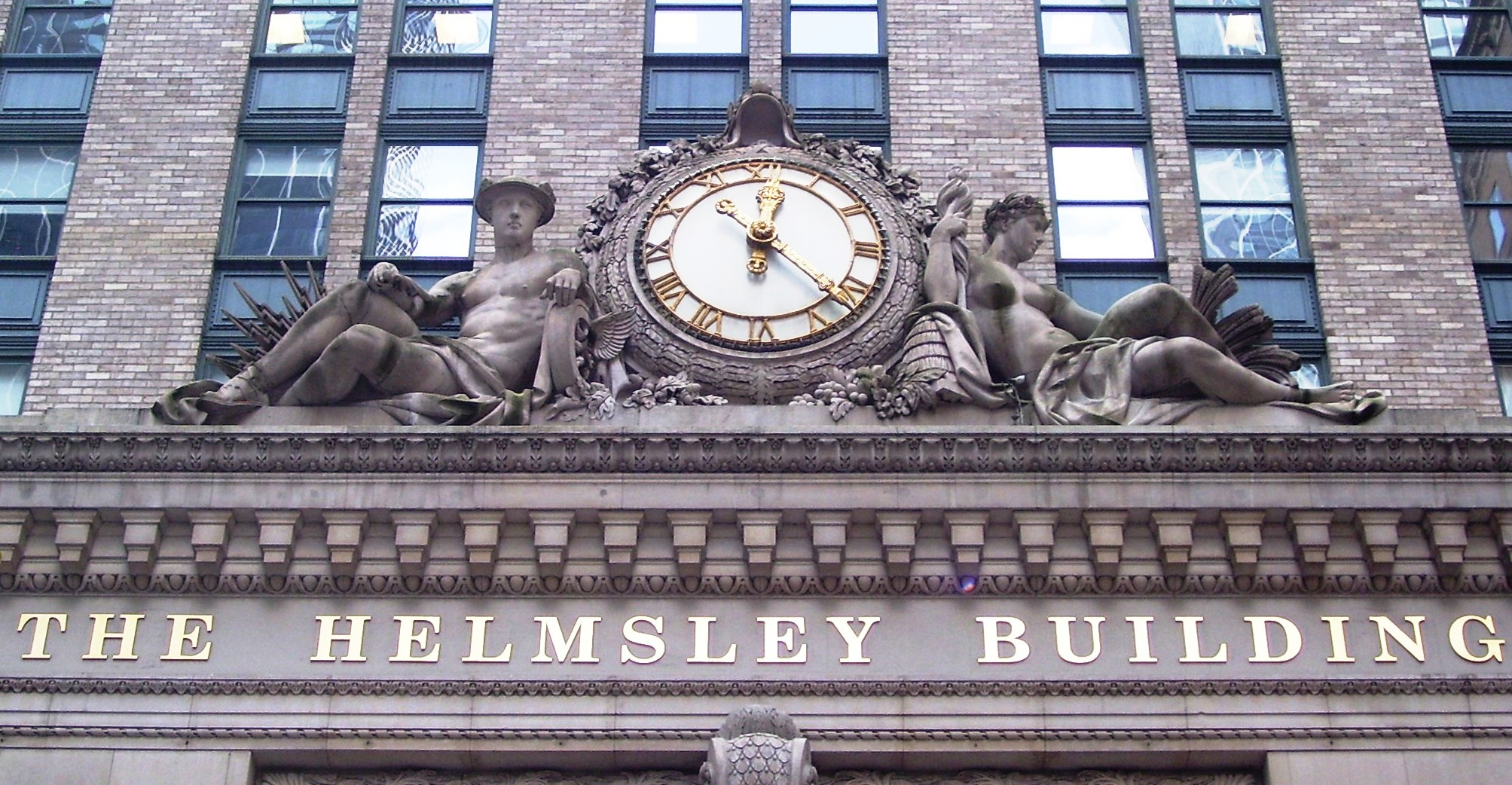
The ornate facade of the Helmsley Building on Park Avenue in New York City

== Notable properties and companies ==
In 1954, Helmsley bought the Lincoln Building, a major office skyscraper on Forty-second Street. A year later, he bought a real estate management company owned by Leon Spear, and the firm became known as Helmsley-Spear.

In 1961, Helmsley bought the Empire State Building—then the tallest building in the world—despite warnings that the maintenance costs would be too high. Other notable New York office properties that Helmsley owned during his career included the Helmsley Building (230 Park Avenue), the Graybar Building (420 Lexington Avenue), the Flatiron Building (175 Fifth Avenue), the Fisk Building (250 West 57th Street), the Toy Center (200 Fifth Avenue) and 1350 Broadway. He also invested in large residential properties including Park West Village on Manhattan's west side, Tudor City on the east side, and in Fresh Meadows in Queens and Parkchester in the Bronx. Industrial properties included the Starrett-Lehigh Building in Manhattan and Bush Terminal in the Bronx.

During the 1970s and 1980s, Helmsley began investing in hotels. Among his holdings were the Helmsley Windsor Hotel (West 58th Street), the Park Lane Hotel (Central Park South) and the Helmsley Palace, which he built behind the Villard Houses on Madison Avenue between 50th and 51st Streets.

In addition to Helmsley-Spear, which had 450 employees by 1980, he also owned Brown Harris Stevens, Inc., a residential brokerage firm. Helmsley bought Brown Harris Stevens in 1964. In addition to its high-end residential brokerage business, the company managed residential buildings, including some of the most prestigious co-ops on Park and Fifth Avenues and Central Park West. When Helmsley sold the business in 1995, the company managed 128 buildings.

Helmsley became known as the most influential real estate magnate in the city. In addition to his activities in Manhattan, in the early 1970s Helmsley built the Palace on Brickell, a 254-unit residential condominium tower located along Miami's prestigious Brickell Avenue.

Helmsley's success was attributed largely to a gift for salesmanship, a willingness to delegate authority, and a less-usual acquisition policy of long-term fixed-rate mortgages during a slump and cash purchases when interest rates were low. This policy has since become standard in real estate.

== Marriage to Leona ==
In 1938, he had married a widow, Eve Ella Sherpick Green. In 1971, he divorced her and the next year married Leona Roberts, vice president of one of his many companies. She was a high-profile manager, dynamic but abrasive ("Queen of Mean"), and she demanded a luxurious lifestyle, quite unlike the modest private life he had been living until then. Basing themselves in a penthouse in the Helmsley-owned Park Lane Hotel on Central Park South, they moved into hotel construction and operation on a big scale, diversifying beyond New York for the first time, to many other big centres. Their portfolio included The Helmsley Middletowne Hotel, the New York Helmsley Hotel (also known as the New York Harley), The Helmsley Windsor Hotel, the St. Moritz (now the Ritz-Carlton), the Carlton House hotels, the Harley Hotel chain and The Helmsley Building in New York City. In 1980, Harry received The Hundred Year Association of New York's Gold Medal Award "in recognition of outstanding contributions to the City of New York."

His crown jewel was New York's 50-story Helmsley Palace Hotel on Madison Avenue at 50th Street. The hotel opened in 1980 to great fanfare and soon became known as the city's most elegant venue. However, it marked the beginning of financial and legal troubles that would dog the marriage until Harry's death. Partly due to Leona's extravagant plans and frequent demands for changes, the cost of the building skyrocketed, and it was proved that they had contracted some work out to their own subsidiaries at inflated prices. In 1988, they were also charged with major tax evasion based on false accounting. By this time, Harry was judged too frail to plead but Leona served 18 months in prison, in addition to being heavily fined.

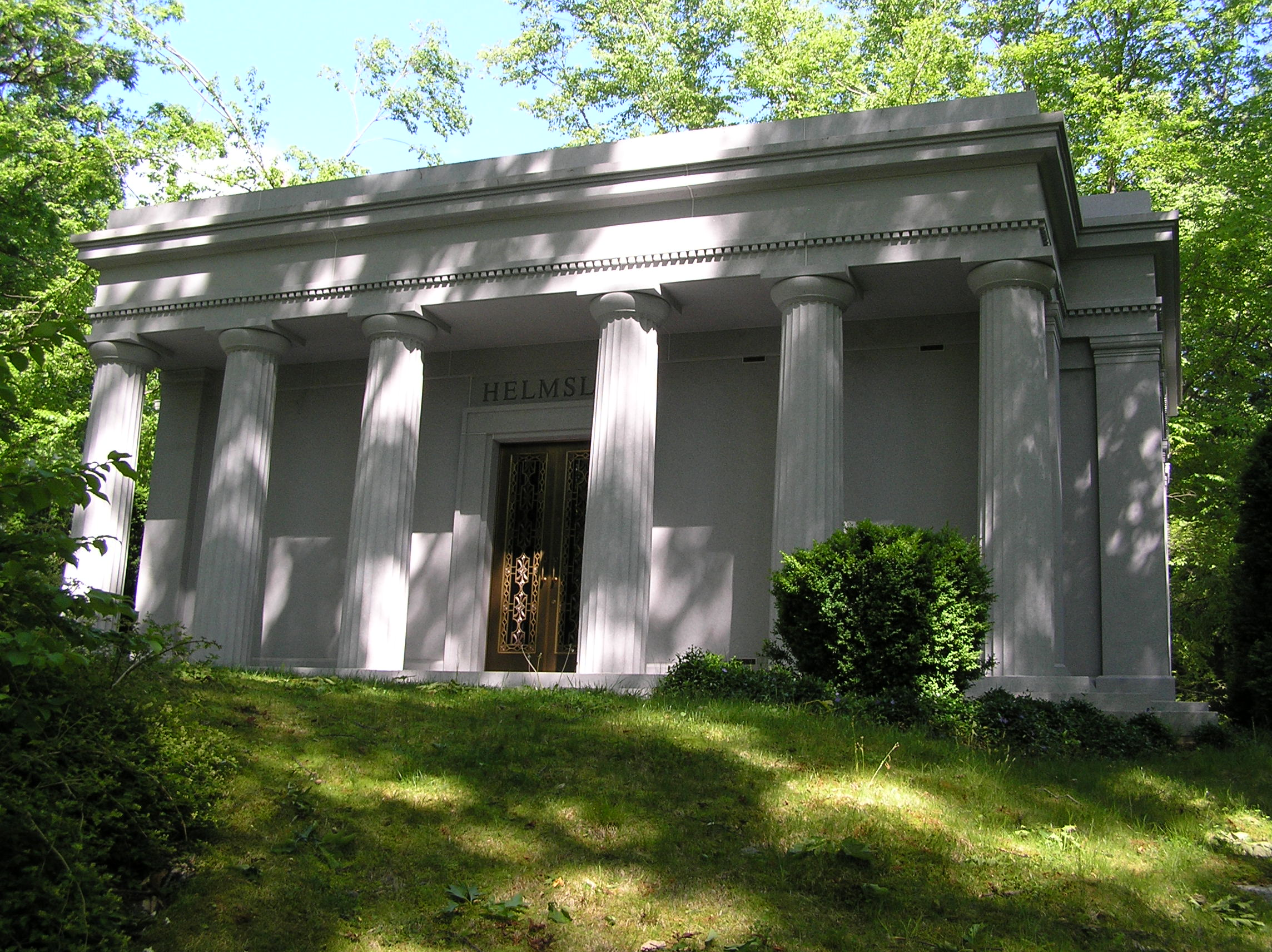
The mausoleum of Harry Helmsley

== Death ==
Helmsley died of pneumonia at age 87 at a hospital in Scottsdale, Arizona, and left all of his empire ($5.5 billion) to his wife, Leona. His remains were initially entombed at Woodlawn Cemetery in the Bronx, New York, but later moved to Sleepy Hollow Cemetery in Sleepy Hollow, New York.

== In popular culture ==
Helmsley's marriage to Leona was dramatized in the 1990 TV movie Leona Helmsley: The Queen of Mean, which starred Lloyd Bridges as Harry and Suzanne Pleshette as Leona. Pleshette was nominated for an Emmy Award and a Golden Globe Award for the portrayal.

== See also ==
- The Leona M. and Harry B. Helmsley Charitable Trust
