= Old Nassau County Courthouse (New York) =

- U.S. National Register of Historic Places
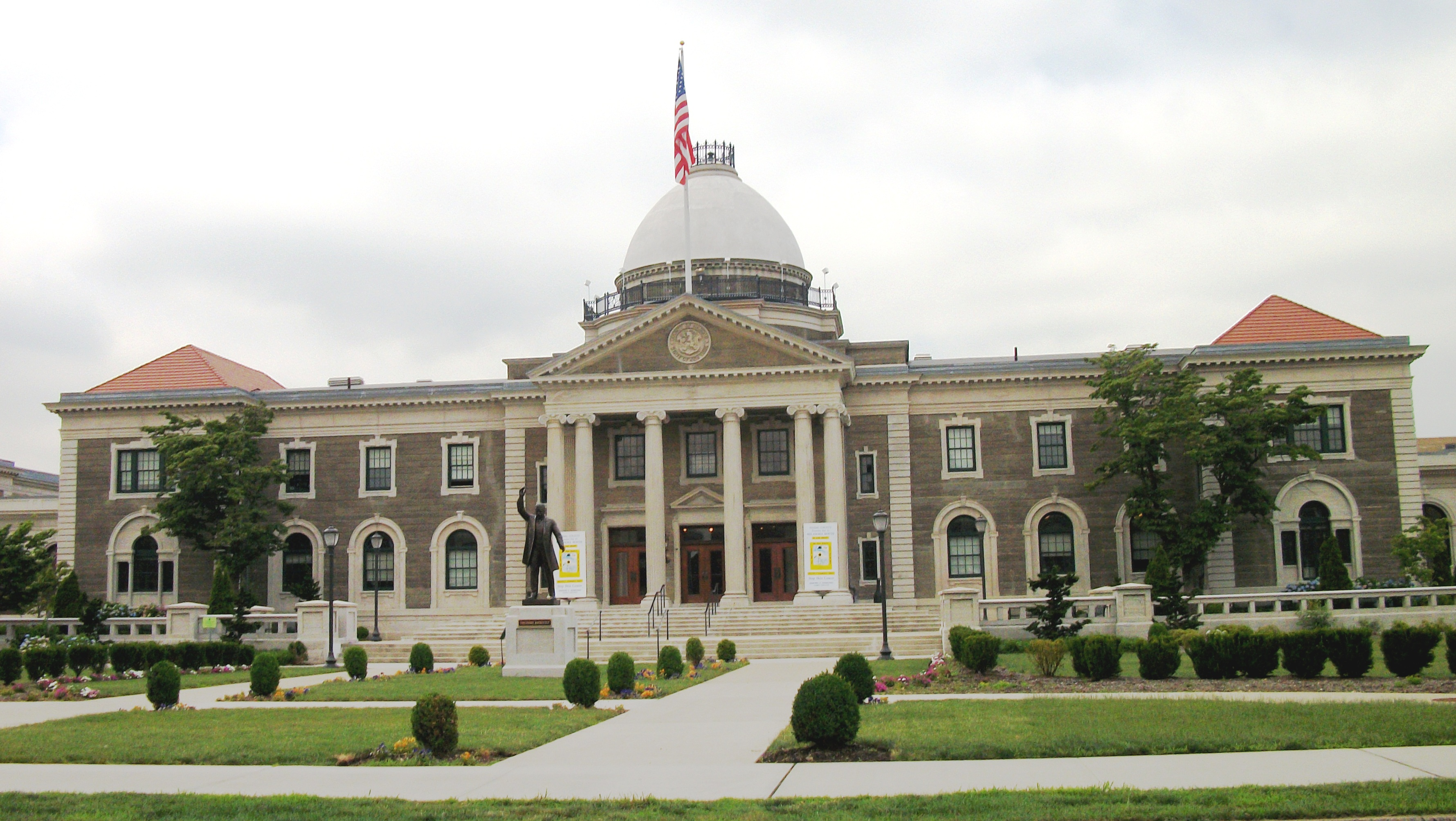

- Location within New York Location within the United States
- Interactive map showing the location of Old Nassau County Courthouse
- Location: 1550 Franklin Ave., Garden City, New York
- Coordinates: 40°44′16″N 73°38′24″W
- Area: 5 acres (2.0 ha)
- Built: 1900-1901
- Architect: William B. Tubby
- Architectural style: Classical Revival
- NRHP reference No.: 78001863
- Added to NRHP: February 17, 1978

The Old Nassau County Courthouse, also known as the Nassau County Courthouse and the Historic Nassau County Courthouse, is a two-story courthouse building located at 1550 Franklin Avenue in Garden City, New York, United States. Formerly the courthouse for Nassau County on Long Island, it is listed on the National Register of Historic Places.

== History ==
Designed by noted New York City architect William B. Tubby in the Classical Revival style of architecture with a grand rotunda capped by a white dome, it was built of poured-in-place reinforced concrete. Then governor Theodore Roosevelt laid its cornerstone in 1900 and it was finished in 1901. Wings designed by Tubby were added in 1916. Later additions and renovations were 1924-1928 under the supervision of architect William J. Beardsley, who had designed the Dutchess County Court House in Poughkeepsie.

In the late 1930s and early 1940s, a new courthouse and other county buildings were built nearby. Some interior alterations to the old building were done in the 1940s and 1950s, but by the time it was added to the National Register of Historic Places in 1978, it was in a state of neglect.

In 2002 the firm of John G. Waite Associates restored the dome to its former glory. Renovations continued until 2008, when county executive Thomas Suozzi presided over a ceremony to celebrate the building, now known as the Theodore Roosevelt Executive and Legislative Building.

== See also ==
- National Register of Historic Places listings in Hempstead (town), New York
