= The Palace (Miami) =

Residential building in Florida, United States

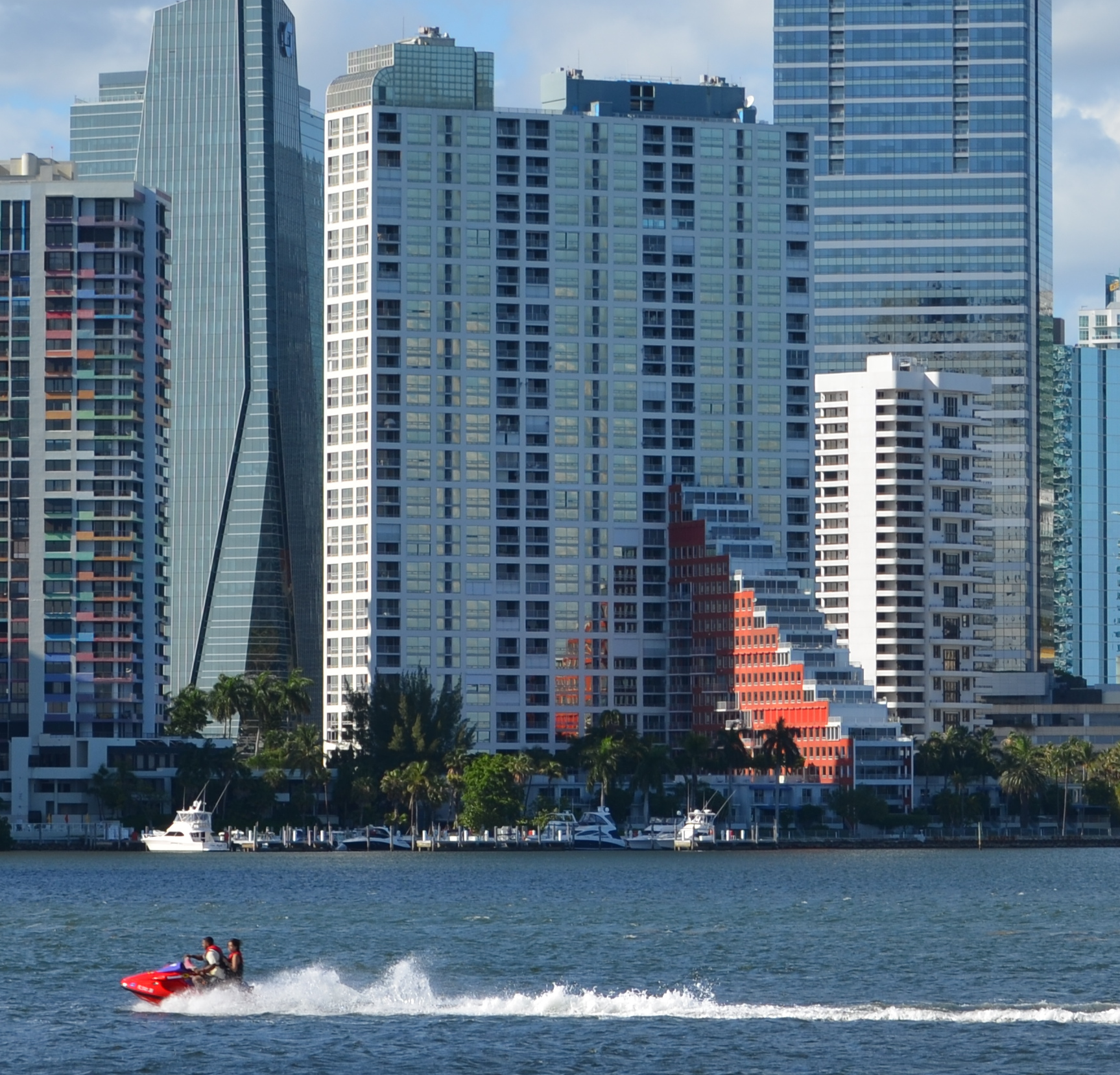
- Interactive map of the The Palace area

General information
- Type: Residential
- Location: 1541 Brickell Avenue, Miami, Florida, United States
- Coordinates: 25°45′23″N 80°11′33″W
- Construction started: 1978
- Completed: 1981
- Opening: 1981

Height
- Roof: 400 ft (120 m)

Technical details
- Floor count: 42

Design and construction
- Architect: Arquitectonica
- Engineer: Franyie Engineers

The Palace is a residential high-rise building located in the Brickell neighborhood of Miami, Florida, United States. Standing at 400 feet (120 meters), the building is currently the 74th-tallest building in the city. The building is located at 1541 Brickell Avenue. The Palace houses 42 floors, and was completed in 1981 by real estate magnate Harry Helmsley. The building was designed by the renowned Arquitectonica architectural firm, and MEP engineering services were provided by Franyie Engineers, Inc.. The building was the first condominium high-rise tower to be exclusively represented and sold by real estate broker Alicia Cervera, founder and chairman of Cervera Real Estate.

== See also ==
- List of tallest buildings in Miami
