= USS Druid =

Patrol vessel of the United States Navy

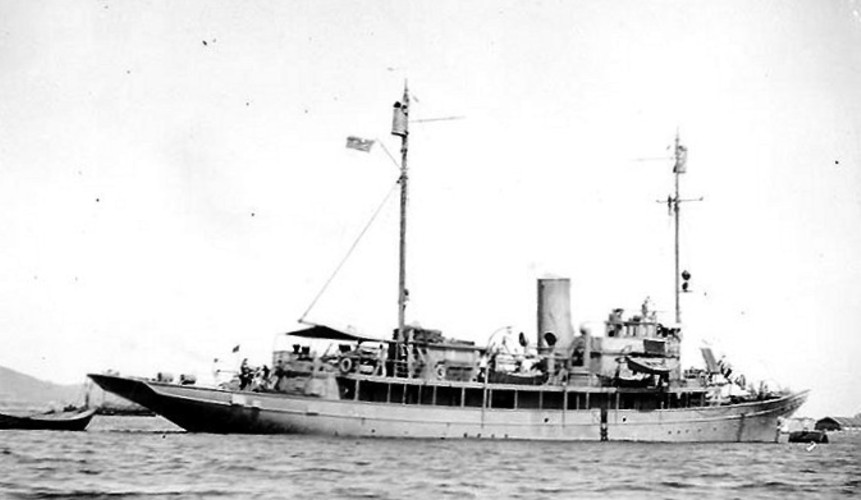
- USS Druid (SP-321) moored in harbor, probably in European waters in 1918.

History

United States
- Name: Rheclair; Nirvana; Druid; USS Druid; Maracay
- Namesake: A member of a religious order in ancient Gaul, Britain, and Ireland (previous name retained)
- Owner: Daniel G. Reid; Nelson W. Aldrich; Rodman Wanamaker; Walter W. Dwyer; U.S. Navy; Carl K. MacFadden
- Builder: Burlee Dry Dock Company of Staten Island, New York
- Yard number: 234
- Launched: 10 February 1902
- Completed: 1902
- Acquired: 2 June 1917
- Commissioned: 17 September 1917
- Decommissioned: 28 May 1919
- Stricken: 17 May 1919
- Identification: 111412
- Fate: Sold 10 September 1919

General characteristics
- Type: Patrol vessel
- Tonnage: 539 GRT
- Length: 217 ft (66 m)
- Beam: 28 ft 6 in (8.69 m)
- Draft: 13 ft 6 in (4.11 m)
- Propulsion: Steam engine
- Speed: 17 knots (31 km/h; 20 mph)
- Complement: 113
- Armament: 2 × 3 in (76 mm) guns; 2 machine guns

USS Druid (SP-321) was a private yacht launched 10 February 1902 as Rheclair that was built for Daniel G. Reid. Reid sold the yacht to Senator Nelson W. Aldrich who renamed the yacht Nirvana only just over a year before his death. Aldrich's estate chartered Nirvana to John Wanamaker until it was bought by his son Rodman Wanamaker who used the yacht for cruising until a fire on 14 December 1916, just before a cruise south, severely damaged the vessel. He chartered an alternate vessel for his trip south and, after full repairs, the yacht was sold to Walter W. Dwyer who gave it the name Druid with intentions to sell the yacht to the government in order to finance a shipyard venture in Pensacola, Florida.

Druid was purchased for $90,000 by the United States Navy, commissioned USS Druid on 17 September 1917 and converted into a patrol vessel in commission from 1917 to 1919. She was sent to the European coast and the Mediterranean to protect Allied shipping from German submarines and other dangers.

After a little over four months in reserve Druid was decommissioned on 28 May 1919 and sold on 10 September 1919 to Carl K. MacFadden who renamed the vessel Maracay and sold it to Venezuelan buyers by 30 June 1922 when the List of Merchant Vessels of the United States shows it among those changing to foreign interest.

== Construction and specifications ==
The yacht was built in 1902 as a private steam yacht Rheclair designed by Clinton H. Crane of Tams, Lemoine & Crane and built by the Burlee Dry Dock Company of Staten Island, New York as hull number 234 for Daniel G. Reid, Commodore of the Atlantic Yacht Club. (Note: Vessel registers show the name spelling as Rheclair but some news and other reports use Reclair.) Rheclair was launched on 10 February 1902 and assigned the official number of 111412 and the call letters KRQN on registration.

Registered dimensions and specifications were tonnage of 367 NRT and 539 GRT, 195 ft 6 in (59.6 m) registered length, 213 ft (64.9 m) length overall, and 183 ft (55.8 m) at the waterline with an extreme breadth of 27 ft 2 in (8.3 m). Ship's depth was 15 ft 9 in (4.8 m) with a draft of 13 ft 9 in (4.2 m). Ships' Data U.S. Naval Vessels, recorded upon entry to naval service, shows slightly different measurements, methods vary and the vessel had undergone ownership changes, with length of 217 ft (66.1 m), beam of 28 ft 6 in (8.7 m) and a mean draft of 13 ft 6 in (4.1 m). That Navy information shows a top speed of 17 knots (31 km/h; 20 mph), cruising speed of 10 knots (19 km/h; 12 mph) and an endurance of 4,800 nautical miles (8,900 km; 5,500 mi). Four Almy boilers provided steam for two vertical triple expansion engines with an 2,400 indicated horsepower (1,800 kW) on trial driving two screws. Electrical power was provided by two General Electric generating sets rated at 18 and 4 kilowatts (24.1 and 5.4 hp) at 120 volts. A 1-kilowatt wireless set was also installed.

A continuous steel deck house covered in teak with a lounge forward, dining room, galley, pantry and smoking room with a passageway connecting all compartments to avoid necessity of going on the open deck. Seven staterooms, each with bathroom, for owner and guests were fore and aft of the machinery space on the second deck. The electric plant provided for ice machines, refrigeration and machinery such as windlasses as well as lighting.

== Private yacht ==
=== Rheclair ===
The yacht was the flagship of the Atlantic Yacht Club and led the club's annual cruises. Reid was also a member of the New York Yacht Club with Rheclair having the private signal of a swallowtail pennant with a red cross on white with a blue "R" in the upper left quadrant. The magazine Sail and Sweep featured a full page photo of Rheclair in its June, 1904 issue. In 1906 the yacht was fitted with new propellers. The yacht participated in the massive two-week Hudson–Fulton Celebration and the River during September–October 1909. Rheclair was present for the Inaugural Naval Parade on 25 September.

In 1914 Daniel G. Reid sold Rheclair to Senator Nelson W. Aldrich who renamed the yacht Nirvana.

=== Nirvana ===
Senator Aldrich had chartered steam yachts for summer use but after his retirement to Providence, Rhode Island, bought the yacht that had ten staterooms and carried a crew of thirty-five. The vessel was to be refurbished and altered in New York before being brought to Narragansett Bay. Aldrich died the next year, 16 April 1915, and the yacht was chartered to John Wanamaker by the estate.

John Wanamaker's son Rodman Wanamaker bought Nirvana from the estate, keeping the name, using the yacht for cruising. On 14 December 1916 a fire severely damaged Nirvana while fitting out for a southern cruise. The fire started in the engine room, spread to the forecastle and endangered other large yachts nearby. The damage was to be quickly repaired, but Wanamaker chartered the houseboat Osiris for his cruise.

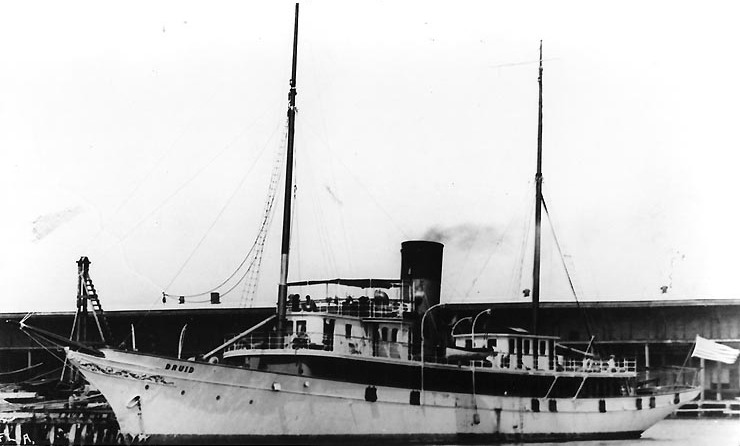
Druid as a private yacht after rename spring of 1917.

Shortly after, by April 1917, Wanamaker had sold Nirvana to Walter W. Dwyer with the repaired yacht sent south.

=== Druid ===
By 1 May 1917 the Dwyer brothers had renamed the yacht and taken Druid to Pensacola, Florida with plans to sell the yacht to the government for naval service and invest the proceeds in a site and construction of a shipyard in Pensacola.

== World War I service ==
Druid was purchased for $90,000 by the Navy in Havana, Cuba, from her owner, W. W. Dwyer of New York City, on 2 June 1917. The Navy began outfitting Druid for World War I "distant service" and commissioned her as USS Druid on 17 September 1917. The ship was fitted with two 3-inch 50 caliber guns and two machine guns.

On 1 November 1917 Druid departed Newport News, Virginia for Gibraltar by way of Bermuda and the Azores in company with USS Cythera (SP-575) and USS Lydonia (SP-700). The ship spent the rest of the war performing patrol, escort, and towing duties in the western Mediterranean, the Strait of Gibraltar, and off the coast of Portugal.

Coast Guard Captain Leroy Reinburg of USS Druid engaged enemy submarines near the Strait of Gibraltar in November 1918. The Druid was operating as part of the Gibraltar Barrage, a squadron of American and British ships assigned to keeping enemy U-boats from passing from the Mediterranean into the Atlantic. On 8 November 1918, men aboard USS Druid sighted three surfaced submarines going through the strait. The weather was foul and the seas rough but the barrage squadron attacked anyway, first with gunfire and then with depth charges. HMS Privet reported that she shot a hole through one of the submarines' conning towers with a 4-inch (100 mm) gun but other than that no other damage was thought to have occurred. USS Druid and her compatriots were successful in defending the strait and on the following day the Americans helped rescue the British crew of the battleship HMS Britannia which had been torpedoed by SM UB-50 while passing through Gibraltar into the Mediterranean. The war ended three days later on 11 November. Captain Reinburg was awarded the Navy Cross for his distinguished service commanding Druid.

Druid returned to the United States following the armistice with Germany, which took place on 11 November 1918.

== Post-war disposition ==
Druid was placed in reserve in New London, Connecticut, on 3 January 1919 and decommissioned on 28 May 1919. She was sold on 10 September 1919.

The 13 November 1920 issue of The Nautical Gazette has a legal notice that under the authority of the Commissioner of Navigation the application of Carl K. MacFadden to change the name of the steam yacht, official number 111412, from Druid to Maracay has been approved. In 1921 registers the yacht's home port is shown as New York but in 1922 the report for the year ended 30 June 1922 shows Maracay as Venezuelan in the list of vessels abandoned, sold to aliens or otherwise changing in nature of registration.
