= Park Lane Hotel (Manhattan) =

Hotel in Manhattan, New York

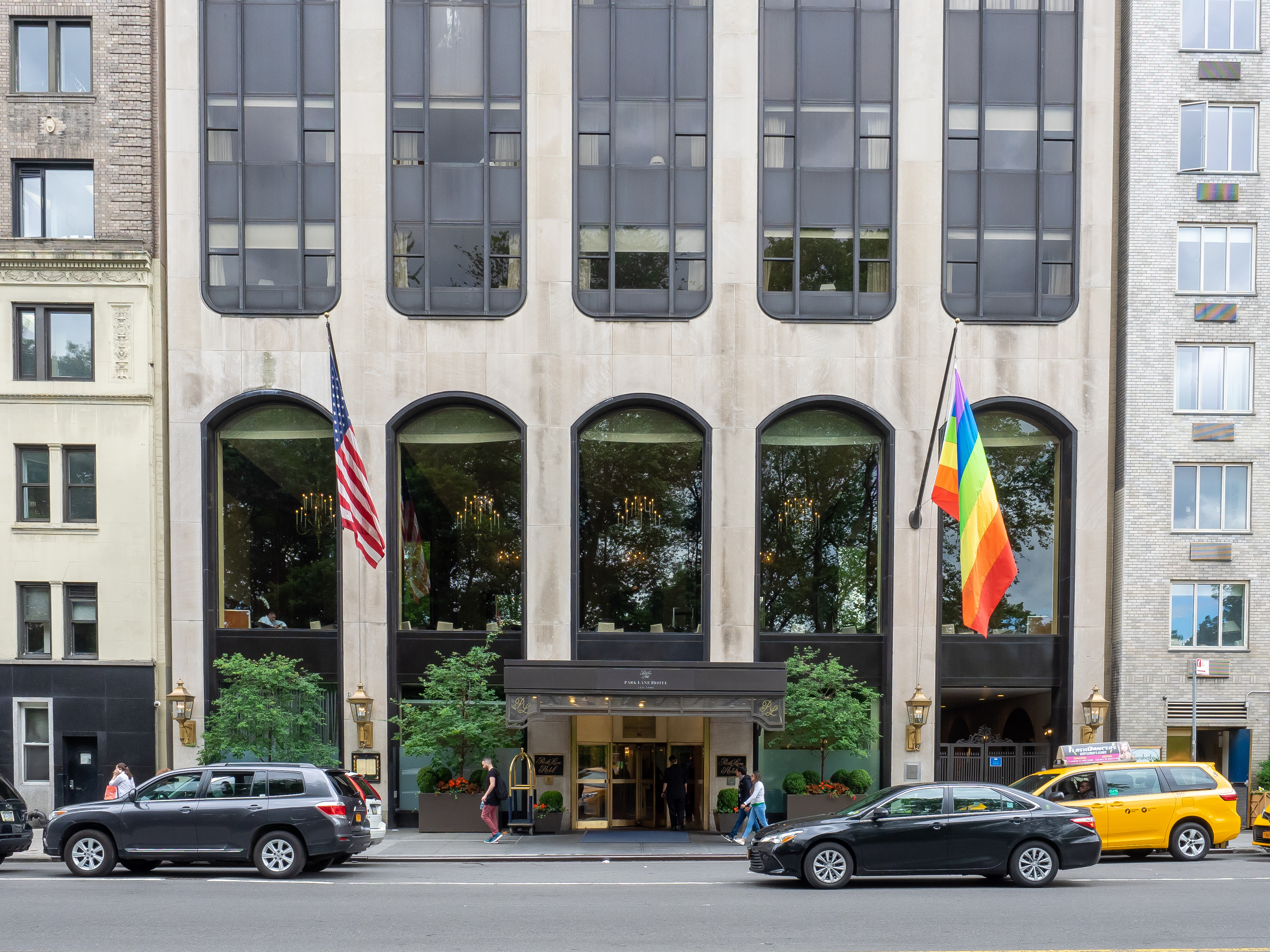
- Entrance as seen from Central Park South
- Interactive map of the Park Lane Hotel area

General information
- Location: 36 Central Park South, Manhattan, New York, United States
- Coordinates: 40.76484°N 73.97535°W
- Opened: 1971; 55 years ago
- Owner: Qatar Investment Authority

Technical details
- Floor count: 46

Design and construction
- Architect: Emery Roth & Sons
- Developer: Harry Helmsley

Other information
- Number of rooms: 628
- Number of restaurants: 2

Website
- parklanenewyork.com

The Park Lane Hotel is a luxury hotel at 36 Central Park South, between Fifth and Sixth Avenues in Midtown Manhattan, New York City. Constructed in 1971, the hotel was designed by Emery Roth & Sons for real estate developer Harry Helmsley. The hotel was owned by Helmsley-Spear, the real estate development company run by Harry and wife Leona Helmsley, until it was sold to Steve Witkoff's Witkoff Group in 2013. Witkoff proposed a supertall skyscraper for the site but later canceled these plans. Following a fraud investigation involving a co-owner, Jho Low, a stake in the hotel was sold to the Mubadala Investment Company in 2019. The Qatar Investment Authority (QIA) bought the hotel in 2023.

== History ==
=== Early years ===
In the early 20th century, several notable hotels were built to cater to the area's affluent visitors, including the JW Marriott Essex House (Frank Grad, 1930), The Pierre (Schultze & Weaver, 1930), the Plaza Hotel (Henry Hardenbergh, 1905–1907), and the Sherry-Netherland Hotel (Schultze & Weaver with Buchman & Kahn, 1926–1927). These hotels adjoined the green expanse of Central Park and sit on parcels that have long been desirable for the development of luxury hotels. The Helmsley Park Lane Hotel was a modern addition to this highly historic and coveted Luxury Hotel district of Central Park South.

The Helmsley Park Lane Hotel's construction spanned from 1967 to its final completion in 1971, during a mid-century building boom that began around 1960 and ended with the collapse of financial markets in 1969. The Park Lane reflects the unbridled, post-war optimism inherent in New York's growth as a world financial and cultural center, and catered to affluent guests from around the world. The hotel also attracted a new class of business travelers who appreciated high-end luxury hotels, versus the convention trade focused hotels of the time period.

=== Preservation and proposed redevelopment ===
The Helmsley Park Lane Hotel was owned and operated by Helmsley-Spear, Inc., the real estate development company run by Harry and wife Leona Helmsley, until it was sold to Steve Witkoff's Witkoff Group in 2013, following Leona's death in 2007.

The Park Lane Hotel structure, at the center of a preservation battle between Witkoff and architects, was purchased by the former in 2013 for $660 million. Witkoff ultimately won the battle, and the structure did not gain landmark status. In 2014, a grassroots effort stemming from architectural enthusiast and community members, Save Park Lane NY, was formed with the goal of preserving the hotel and presenting a case for historic preservation to the Landmarks Preservation Commission of New York City. Save Park Lane NY was to present the request for landmark preservation of the Park Lane Hotel to Community Board 5 on October 6, 2014. Witkoff Group proposed 1 Park Lane, a 1,210-foot supertall skyscraper, on the hotel's site, to be designed by Handel Architects. If built, the building would have ranked among the tallest in New York City. The building would have contained eighty-eight condominiums, with a library, a pool, a spa, and a restaurant.

In early 2016, Witkoff announced that plans for the tower had been put on hold. and Greenland Group of Shanghai bought a 41% stake in the building that year. Co-owner Jho Low failed to pay his share of the hotel's mortgage in July 2016, and the United States Department of Justice (DOJ) began investigating corruption allegations against him. A judge ruled in early 2017 that the entire hotel should be put up for sale to address the DOJ's forfeiture complaint against Low, and the building was thus placed for sale in May 2017. The hotel had an asking price of $1 billion, but all of the bids for the hotel were for a much lower price. The DOJ obtained a $140 million ownership stake in the hotel in December 2018 from Low. Early the next year, this stake was transferred to Mubadala Investment Company. Witkoff refinanced the building in 2019 with a $615 million loan from Deutsche Bank and JPMorgan Chase.

In August 2023, the Qatar Investment Authority bought the Park Lane Hotel from Witkoff for $623 million. QIA announced plans in 2025 to redevelop the Park Lane Hotel as a luxury hotel and condominium residences.

== Architecture ==
The Park Lane's design bridges the gap between modernism and post modernism. Guestrooms and suites at the Park Lane capture unobstructed panoramic views of Central Park from sleek black windows that span the entire vertical height of the limestone forty-six story structure. The hotel is composed of a vertical slab rising above a two-story, L-shaped base. Emery Roth & Sons specialized in high-rise commercial buildings and worked in partnership with many other major real estate developers such as the Durst Organization, Tishman Construction, and the Uris Corporation. Significant examples of their work in New York include the MetLife Building (1963), 600 Lexington Avenue (1984), and the Lotte New York Palace Hotel (1980).
