= Leona Helmsley =

American businesswoman (1920–2007)

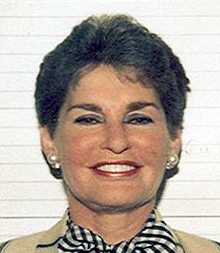
- Helmsley in 1988
- Born: Lena Mindy Rosenthal; July 4, 1920; Marbletown, New York, U.S.
- Died: August 20, 2007 (aged 87); Greenwich, Connecticut, U.S.
- Other names: Lee Roberts; Mindy Roberts; Leni Roberts; Lena Rosenthol
- Education: Abraham Lincoln High School
- Occupations: Hotelier; Real estate investor
- Spouses: Leo Panzirer (m. 1938; div. 1952) Joseph Lubin (twice divorced) Harry Helmsley (m. 1972; died 1997)

Leona Roberts Helmsley (born Lena Mindy Rosenthal; July 4, 1920 – August 20, 2007) was an American businesswoman. After allegations of non-payment were made by contractors hired to improve Helmsley's Connecticut home, she was investigated and convicted of federal income tax evasion and other crimes in 1989. Although having initially received a sentence of 4 years, she was required to serve only 19 months in prison and two months under house arrest. During the trial, a former housekeeper testified that she had heard Helmsley say: "We don't pay taxes; only the little people pay taxes". This quote was identified with her for the rest of her life. Helmsley's flamboyant personality and reputation for tyrannical behavior, especially towards her employees, earned her the nickname Queen of Mean.

== Early life ==
Helmsley was born Lena Mindy Rosenthal in Marbletown, New York, to Polish-Jewish immigrants, Ida Popkin, a homemaker, and Morris Rosenthal, a hatmaker. Her family moved to Brooklyn while she was still a girl, and moved six more times before settling in Manhattan. After dropping out of Abraham Lincoln High School to seek her fortune, she changed her name several times over a short period—from Lee Roberts, Mindy Roberts, and Leni Roberts—before finally going by Leona Mindy Roberts and having her surname legally changed to Roberts.

Roberts' first husband was attorney Leo Panzirer, whom she divorced in 1952. Their only son died of heart failure at age 42. Leona was twice married to and divorced from her second husband, garment industry executive Joseph Lubin. After a brief period at a sewing factory, she joined a New York real estate firm, where she eventually became vice-president. Roberts was a chain smoker, consuming several packs a day. She would later claim that she appeared in billboard ads for Chesterfield cigarettes, but her claim remains unsubstantiated.

== Career as a hotelier ==
In 1968, while Roberts was working as a condominium broker, she met and began her involvement with the then-married real estate entrepreneur Harry Helmsley. Two years later, she joined one of Harry's brokerage firms—Brown Harris Stevens—as a senior vice-president. At that time, she was already a millionaire in her own right. Harry divorced his wife of 33 years and married Roberts on April 8, 1972. The marriage may well have saved her career, as several of her tenants had sued her the year before for forcing them to buy condominiums. They won, and she was forced not only to compensate the tenants but to give them three-year leases. Her real estate license was also suspended, so she focused on running Harry's growing hotel empire.

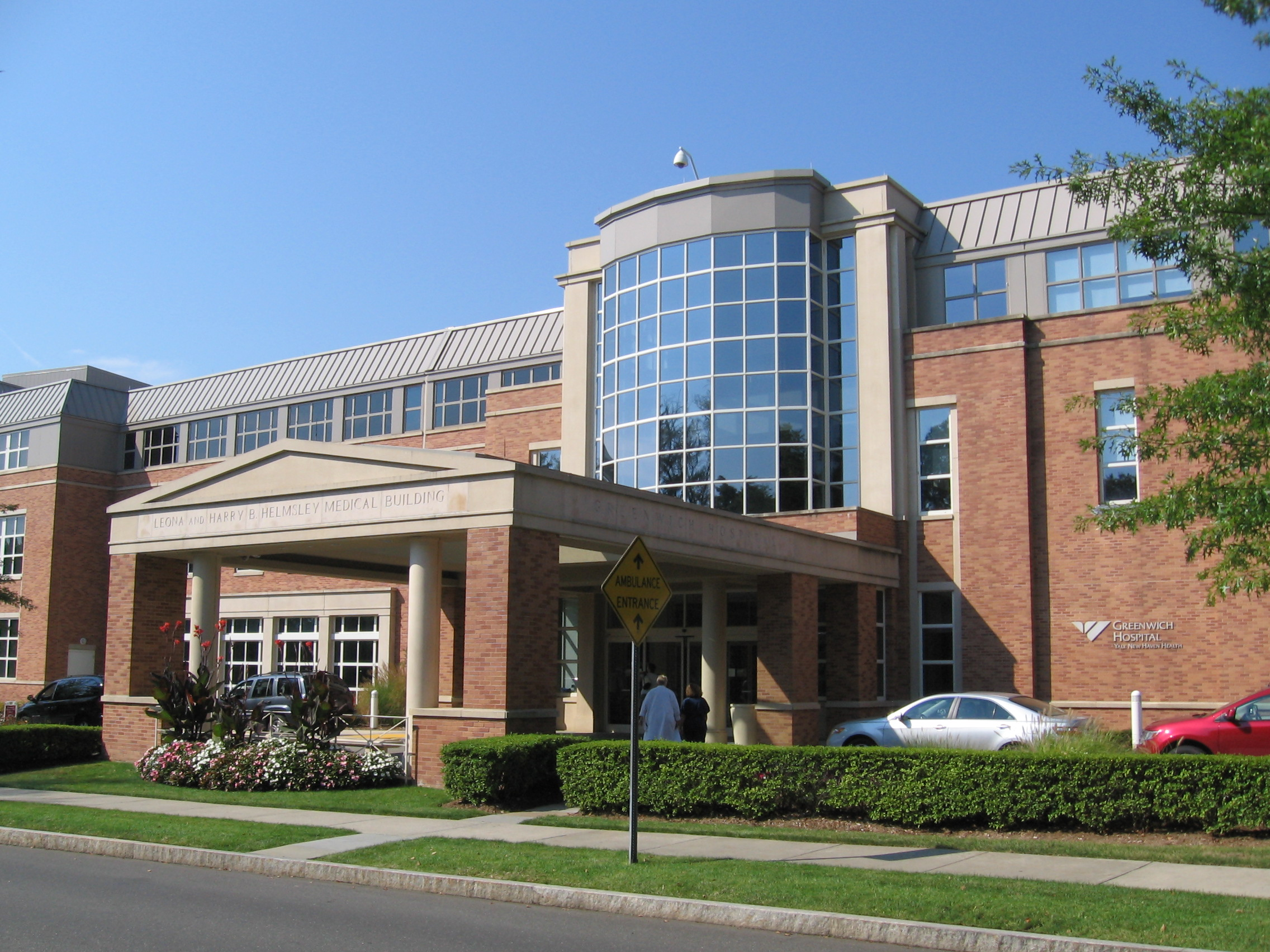
The Leona and Harry B. Helmsley Medical Building of Greenwich Hospital in Greenwich, Connecticut

Supposedly under her influence, Harry began a program of conversion of apartment buildings into condos. He later concentrated on the hotel industry, building the Helmsley Palace Hotel on Madison Avenue. Together, the Helmsleys built a New York real estate empire that included 230 Park Avenue, the Empire State Building, and the Tudor City apartment complex on the East Side, as well as Helmsley-Spear Inc., their management and leasing business. The couple also developed properties that included the Helmsley Palace Hotel, the New York Helmsley Hotel, the Park Lane Hotel, and hotels in Florida and other states. By the beginning of 1989, twenty-three hotels in the chain were directly controlled by Leona Helmsley.

Helmsley was featured in an advertising campaign portraying her as a demanding "queen" who wanted nothing but the best for her guests. The slightest mistake was usually grounds for firing, and Helmsley was known to shout insults and obscenities at targeted employees just before they were fired. On March 31, 1982, Helmsley's only child, Jay Panzirer, died of a heart attack resulting from arrhythmia. Her son's widow, who lived in a property that Helmsley owned, received an eviction notice shortly after his funeral. Helmsley successfully sued her son's estate for money and property that she claimed he had borrowed, and she was ultimately awarded $146,092.

== Tax-evasion conviction ==
Despite the Helmsleys' net worth totalling over $1 billion, they were known for disputing payments to contractors and vendors. In 1983, the Helmsleys bought Dunnellen Hall, a 21-room mansion in Greenwich, Connecticut, to use as a weekend retreat. The property cost $11 million but the Helmsleys wanted to make it even more luxurious. The work included a $1 million dance floor, a silver clock and a mahogany card table. The remodeling bills came to $8 million, which the Helmsleys were loath to pay. A group of contractors sued the Helmsleys for non-payment and the Helmsleys eventually paid off most of the debt owed to the contractors. In 1985, during court proceedings in relation to the lawsuit, the contractors revealed that most of their work was being illegally billed to the Helmsleys' hotels as business expenses. The contractors sent a stack of the falsified invoices to the New York Post to prove that the Helmsleys were trying to avoid tax liabilities. The resulting Post story led to a federal criminal investigation. Jeremiah McCarthy, the Helmsleys' executive engineer, also alleged that Leona repeatedly demanded that he sign invoices to bill personal expenses to Helmsley-Spear and, when McCarthy declined to do so, exploded with tyrannical outbursts, shouting, "You're not my fucking partner! You'll sign what I tell you to sign." In 1988, then-U.S. Attorney Rudy Giuliani indicted the Helmsleys and two of their associates on several tax-related charges, as well as extortion.

The trial was delayed until the summer of 1989 due to numerous motions by the Helmsleys' attorneys, most of them related to Harry's health. He had begun to appear feeble shortly after the beginning of his relationship with Leona years before and had recently suffered a stroke on top of a pre-existing heart condition. Ultimately, he was ruled mentally and physically unfit to stand trial and Leona would face the charges alone. At trial, a former Helmsley-Spear executive, Paul Ruffino, said that he refused to sign phony invoices billing the company for work done on the Connecticut mansion. Ruffino, originally employed to assist Harry through the Hospitality Management Services arm, said that Leona fired him on several occasions for refusing to sign the bills, only for Harry to usually tell him to ignore her and come back to work.

Another one of the key witnesses was a former housekeeper at the Helmsley home, Elizabeth Baum, who recounted Leona telling her, "We don't pay taxes. Only the little people pay taxes." Leona denied saying this. By then, however, the trial was already highlighting her abusive and micromanaging behavior towards family members, employees, contractors and even senior executives. Former employees testified at trial "about how they feared her, with one recalling how she casually fired him while she was being fitted for a dress". Most legal observers felt that Helmsley's hostile personality, arrogance, and "naked greed" alienated the jurors. On August 30, Helmsley was convicted of one count of conspiracy to defraud the United States, three counts of tax evasion, three counts of filing false personal tax returns, sixteen counts of assisting in the filing of false corporate and partnership tax returns, and ten counts of mail fraud. She was, however, acquitted of extortion—a charge that could have sent her to prison for the rest of her life. Helmsley was instead originally sentenced to four years in prison, which was eventually reduced to 18 months after resentencing. Nonetheless, when it was clear that she was going to prison, Helmsley collapsed outside the courthouse. She was later diagnosed with a heart irregularity and hypertension. Helmsley's new lawyer, retained to appeal the judgment, was Alan Dershowitz. Following the appeal, which resulted in a reduced sentence, she was ordered to report to prison on tax day, April 15, 1992. She was released from custody on January 26, 1994, after serving twenty-one months.

== After prison ==
Helmsley's later years were apparently spent in isolation, especially after Harry died in 1997. He left her his entire fortune, including the Helmsley hotels, the Helmsley Palace and the Empire State Building, estimated to be worth well in excess of $5 billion. Her few friends included Patrick Ward and Kathy and Rick Hilton. A 2001 Chicago Sun-Times article depicted her as estranged from her grandchildren and with few friends, living alone in a lavish apartment with her dog. Helmsley was forced to give up control of her hotel empire, since most of her hotels had bars, and New York does not allow convicted felons to hold alcohol licenses. She spent her final years at her penthouse atop the Park Lane Hotel. In 2002, Helmsley was sued by Charles Bell, a former employee who alleged that he was discharged solely for being gay. A jury agreed and ordered Helmsley to pay Bell $11,200,000 in damages. A judge subsequently reduced this amount to $554,000.

Although Helmsley had a reputation as the "Queen of Mean", some considered her generous in her charitable contributions after her prison term. After the 9/11 attacks, Helmsley donated $5 million to help the families of New York City firefighters and police. Other contributions included $25 million to New York–Presbyterian Hospital for medical research in 2006 through a charitable trust fund. The donations eventually grew to $65 million to establish the Center for Advanced Digestive Care at the hospital in 2009.

== Death ==
Helmsley died of congestive heart failure at the age of 87, on August 20, 2007, at Dunnellen Hall. Cardiovascular disease ran in her family, having killed her father, son and one of her sisters. After a week at the Frank E. Campbell Funeral Chapel, she was entombed next to Harry Helmsley in a mausoleum constructed for $1.4 million and set on 0.75 acres (3,000 m^{2}) in Sleepy Hollow Cemetery, Westchester County, New York. Among the few distinctive features of the mausoleum are three wall-embedded stained-glass windows, in the style of Louis Comfort Tiffany, showing the skyline of Manhattan. Leona Helmsley was known for not liking dirt, and left $3 million for the 1,300-square-foot (120 m^{2}) family mausoleum to be "washed or steam-cleaned at least once a year".

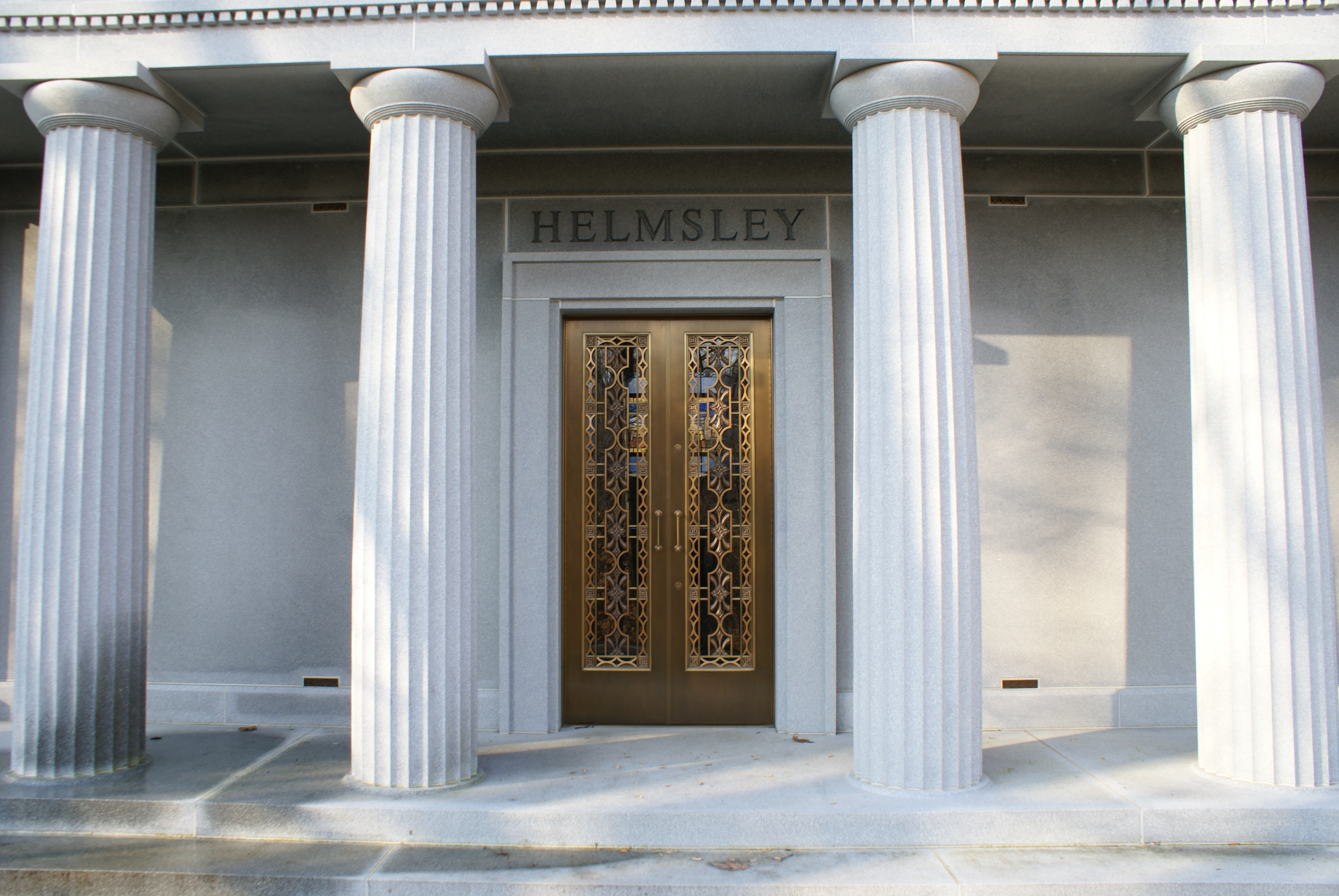
The mausoleum of Harry Helmsley in Sleepy Hollow Cemetery

Helmsley left the bulk of her estate—estimated at more than $4 billion—to the Leona M. and Harry B. Helmsley Charitable Trust. In addition to providing directly for her own dog in her will, she left separate instructions that the trust, now valued at $5 billion, be used to benefit dogs. The courts have since ruled that the trust is not legally bound to wishes separate from the trust documents.

The will left her Maltese dog, Trouble, a $12 million trust fund. This sum was subsequently reduced to $2 million as excessive to fulfill its purpose. Her choice was branded 3rd in Fortune magazine's "101 Dumbest Moments in Business" of 2007. Trouble lived in Florida with Carl Lekic, the general manager of the Helmsley Sandcastle Hotel. Lekic stated that $2 million would pay for the dog's maintenance for more than 10 years—the annual $100,000 for full-time security (several death threats against the dog had been received), $8,000 for grooming and $1,200 for food. Lekic was paid a $60,000 annual guardianship fee.

Trouble died at age twelve in December 2010, at which time the remainder of the funds reverted to the Leona M. and Harry B. Helmsley Charitable Trust. Although Helmsley's wishes were to have the dog interred with her in the mausoleum, New York state law prohibits interment of pets in human cemeteries and the dog was subsequently cremated.

Helmsley had four grandchildren. Two of them each received $5 million in trust and $5 million in cash, under the condition that they visit their father's grave site once each calendar year. Their signing a registration book would prove that they had visited the grave. Her other two grandchildren, Craig and Meegan Panzirer, received nothing.

In a 2008 judgment, Manhattan Surrogate Court Judge Renee Roth ruled that Helmsley was mentally unfit when she executed her will. Roth reduced the $12 million trust fund for the pet Trouble to $2 million. Of the $10 million originally bequeathed to Trouble, $4 million was awarded to the charitable trust, and $6 million was awarded to Craig and Meegan Panzirer, who had been disinherited in the will. The ruling requires the Panzirers to keep silent about their dispute with their grandmother and deliver to the court any documents they have about her. She left $15 million for her brother Alvin Rosenthal. Helmsley also left $100,000 to her chauffeur, Nicholas Celea.

== Reputation ==
Helmsley acquired the moniker "Queen of Mean", reportedly inspired after an advertising campaign promoting her as the "Queen of the Palace" of the Helmsley Palace Hotel. Helmsley became known by this nickname in the mainstream press. Helmsley was known for "tyrannizing her employees". Alan Dershowitz, while having breakfast with her at one of the Helmsley hotels, received a cup of tea with a tiny bit of water spilled on the saucer. Helmsley grabbed the cup from the waiter and smashed it on the floor, then told him to beg for his job. In another account of Helmsley's behavior, she had a barbecue pit constructed for her home. The work was performed by Eugene Brennan, a friend of Jeremiah McCarthy, the chief engineer of Helmsley-Spear. When the final bill came to $13,000, she refused to pay, claiming shoddy workmanship. When McCarthy pleaded with her to honor the bill, citing the favor done on his behalf and informing her that Brennan had six children to support, Helmsley replied, "Why didn't he keep his pants on? Then he wouldn't need the money."

== Legacy ==
The 1990 TV film Leona Helmsley: The Queen of Mean starred Suzanne Pleshette as Helmsley. Pleshette was nominated for the Primetime Emmy Award for Outstanding Lead Actress in a Limited or Anthology Series or Movie and the Golden Globe Award for Best Actress – Miniseries or Television Film. In 1989, a biography entitled The Queen of Mean: The Unauthorized Biography of Leona Helmsley was published by Bantam Books.
