= The Leona M. and Harry B. Helmsley Charitable Trust =

American nonprofit foundation

The Leona M. and Harry B. Helmsley Charitable Trust is a foundation established in 1999 and administered by four trustees selected by Leona Helmsley. The Trust supports a wide range of organizations, with a major focus on health and medical research, in addition to conservation, education, social services and cultural access.

Since 2009, the trust has spent over $850 million on rural health care in the Midwest and Rocky Mountain regions of the US, focusing on psychiatric, cardiac and cancer care.

In April 2022, The Leona M. and Harry B. Helmsley Charitable Trust, announced a $22.5 million donation to the Neglected tropical diseases fund, The END Fund. The aim of the donation was to aid in the supporting 1.7 billion people affected by EDN's such as onchocerciasis (river blindness) and lymphatic filariasis (LF) across Ethiopia, Sudan and South Sudan.
