= Waveny Park =

Park in New Canaan, Connecticut

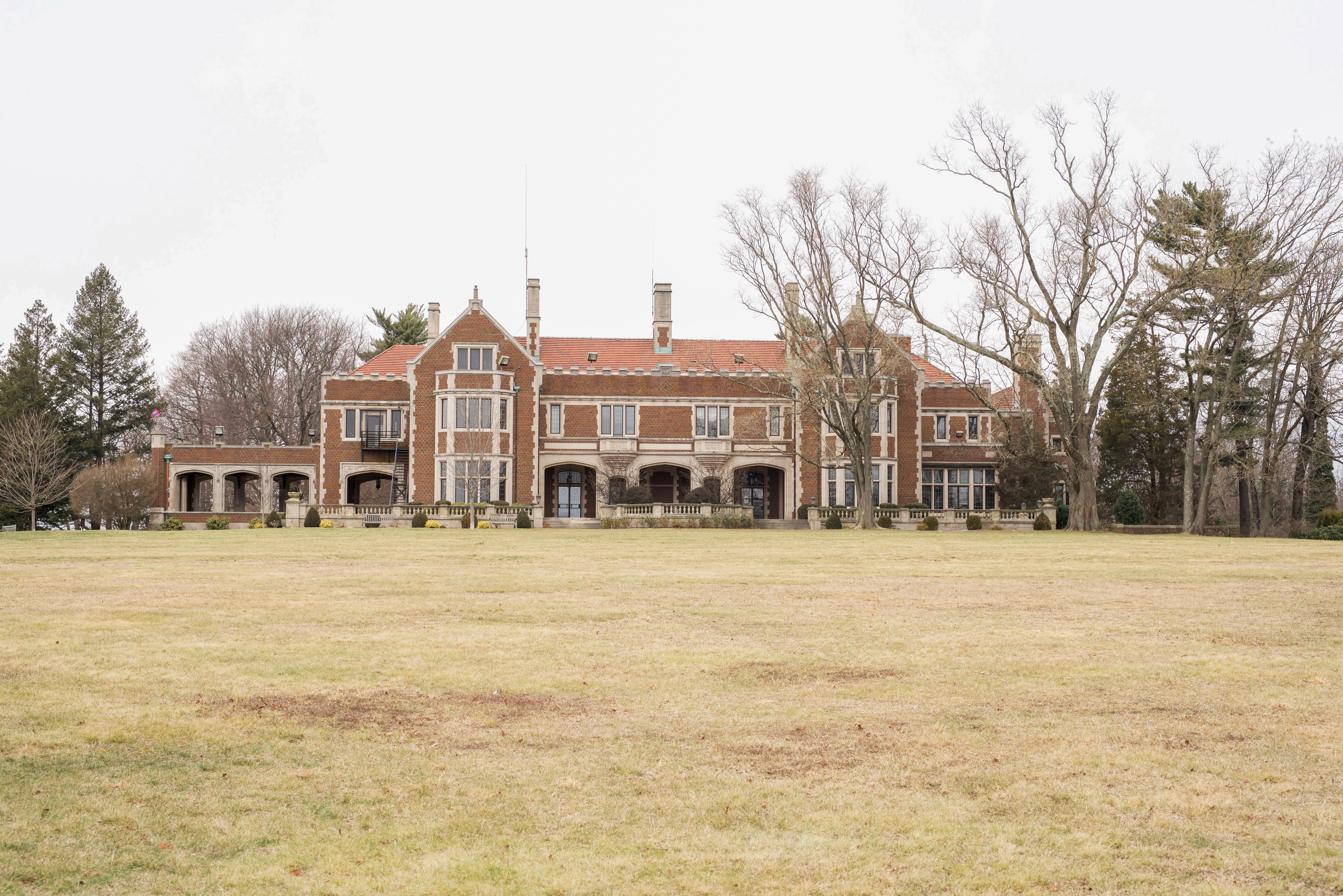
- Waveny House

- Location within Connecticut Location within the United States
- Interactive map showing the location of Waveny Park
- Location: New Canaan, Connecticut
- Coordinates: 41°07′21″N 73°29′27″W
- Built: 1912 (Waveny House)
- Website: wavenyparkconservancy.org/visit/

Waveny Park (also known as Waveny House) is a park in New Canaan, Connecticut. The park's centerpiece is "the castle" built in 1912 and surrounded by 300 acres (1.2 km^{2}) of fields, ponds and trails. The architect for the structure was William Tubby. Landscape design for the original residence was by landscape architect Frederick Law Olmsted Jr. The property was listed on the National Register of Historic Places in 2019.

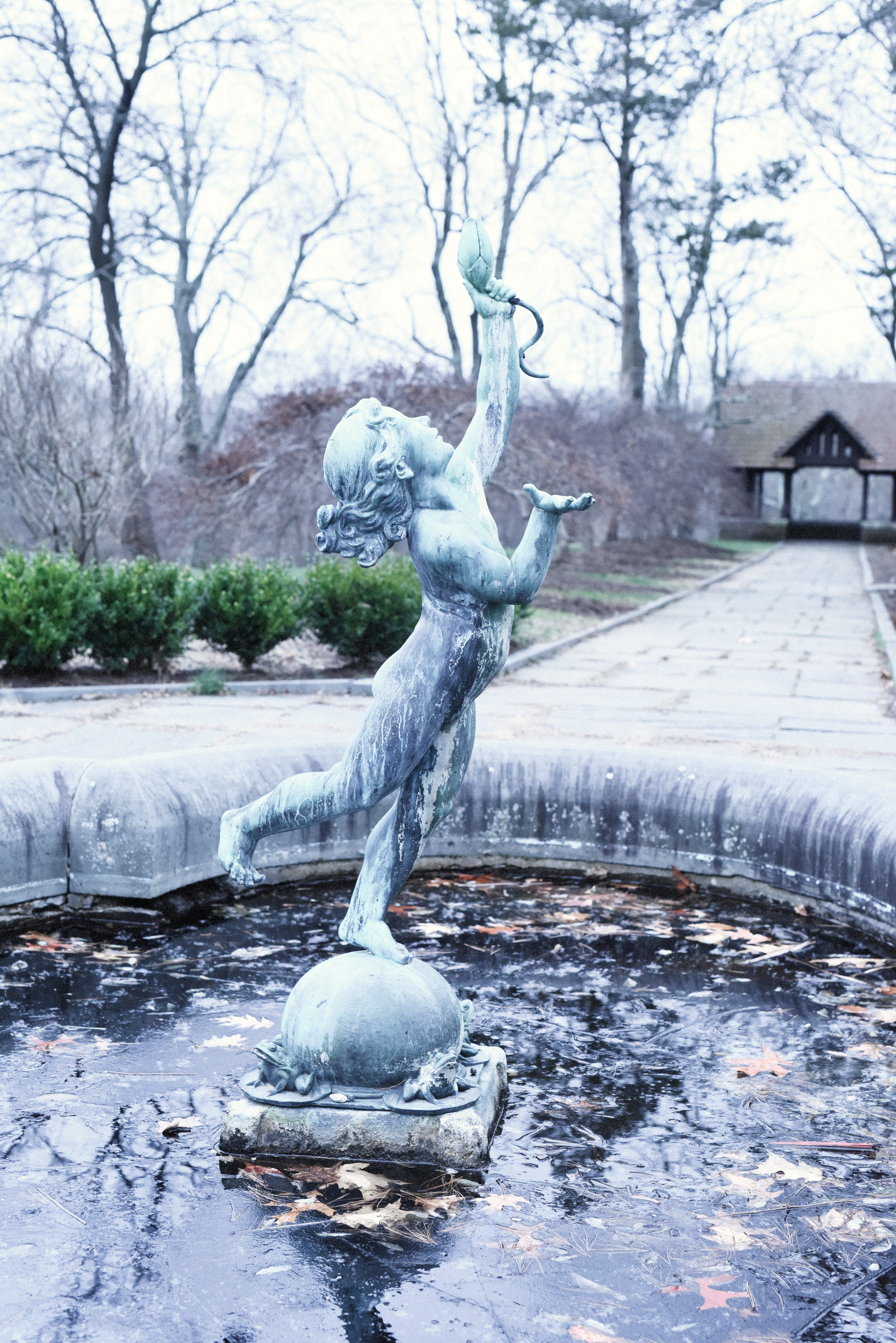
Waveny Park

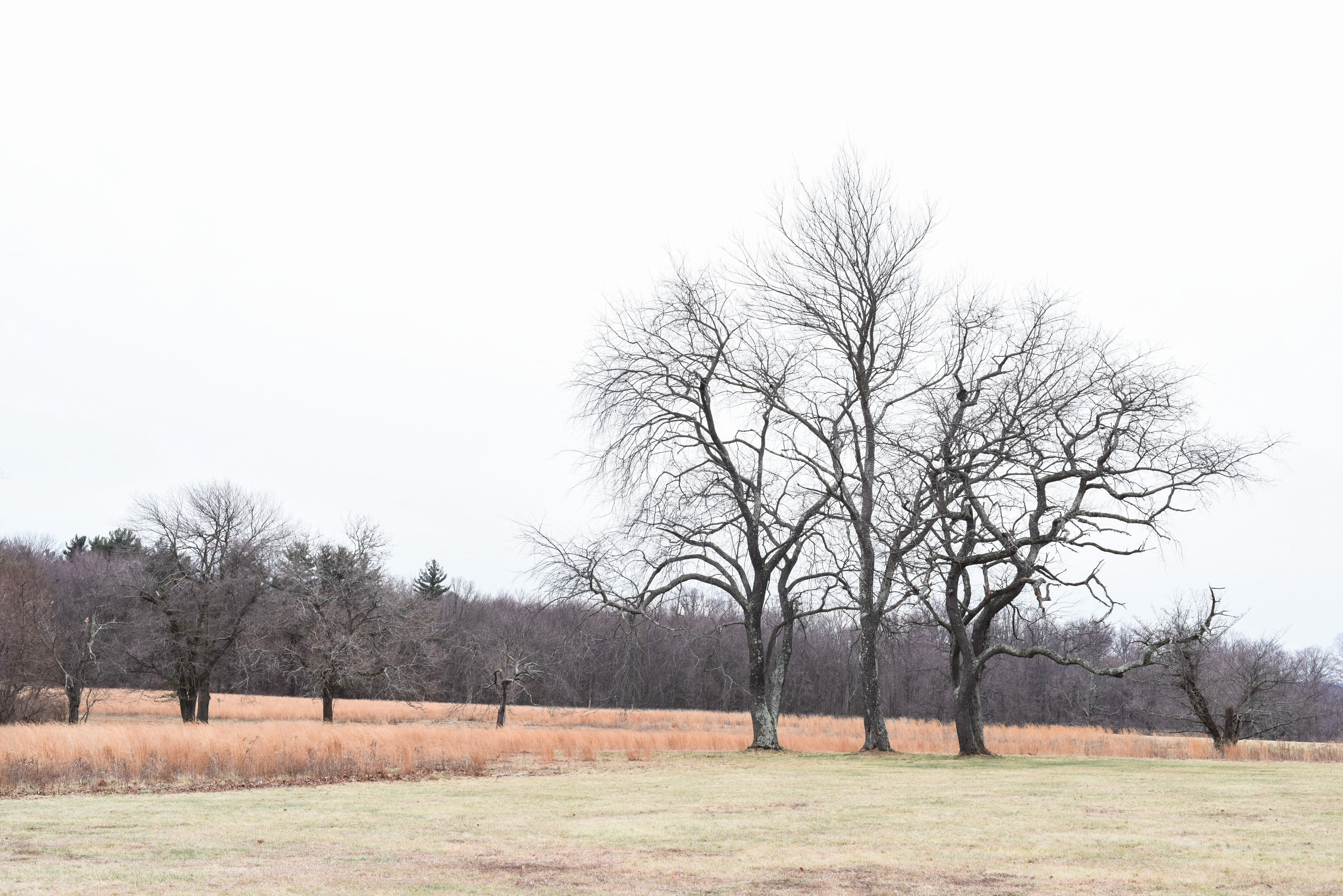
Waveny Park

The house was used for exterior shots for the fictional 'Cortlandt Manor' on the soap opera All My Children for many years; exteriors of the estate were also used in the 2004 remake film The Stepford Wives.

The park is bordered by Farm Road to the North, the Merritt Parkway to the South, South Avenue to the East, and the Metro-North Railroad right-of-way and Old Stamford Road to the West. Over the years, numerous additional town structures have been built on parts of the property including New Canaan High School, Waveny LifeCare Network, an aquatic center, two public water supply towers, as well as paddle tennis courts. To be able to use some of these facilities, a nominal annual fee is charged. The Parks recreations are enjoyed by many people from all around Fairfield County.

Lewis Lapham, one of the founders of Texaco and the man who built Waveny House, spent summers there with his family for many years. His grandson, actor Christopher Lloyd had lived in the mansion during his childhood. The Lapham family gave the Town of New Canaan most of the estate land in 1967 and sold Waveny House and its surrounding 300 acres (1.2 km^{2}) to the Town for $1,500,000.

George Lascelles, 7th Earl of Harewood, the eldest paternal first cousin of Queen Elizabeth II, married his second wife, Patricia Tuchman on July 32, 1967 at Waveny Park.

== Pictures ==
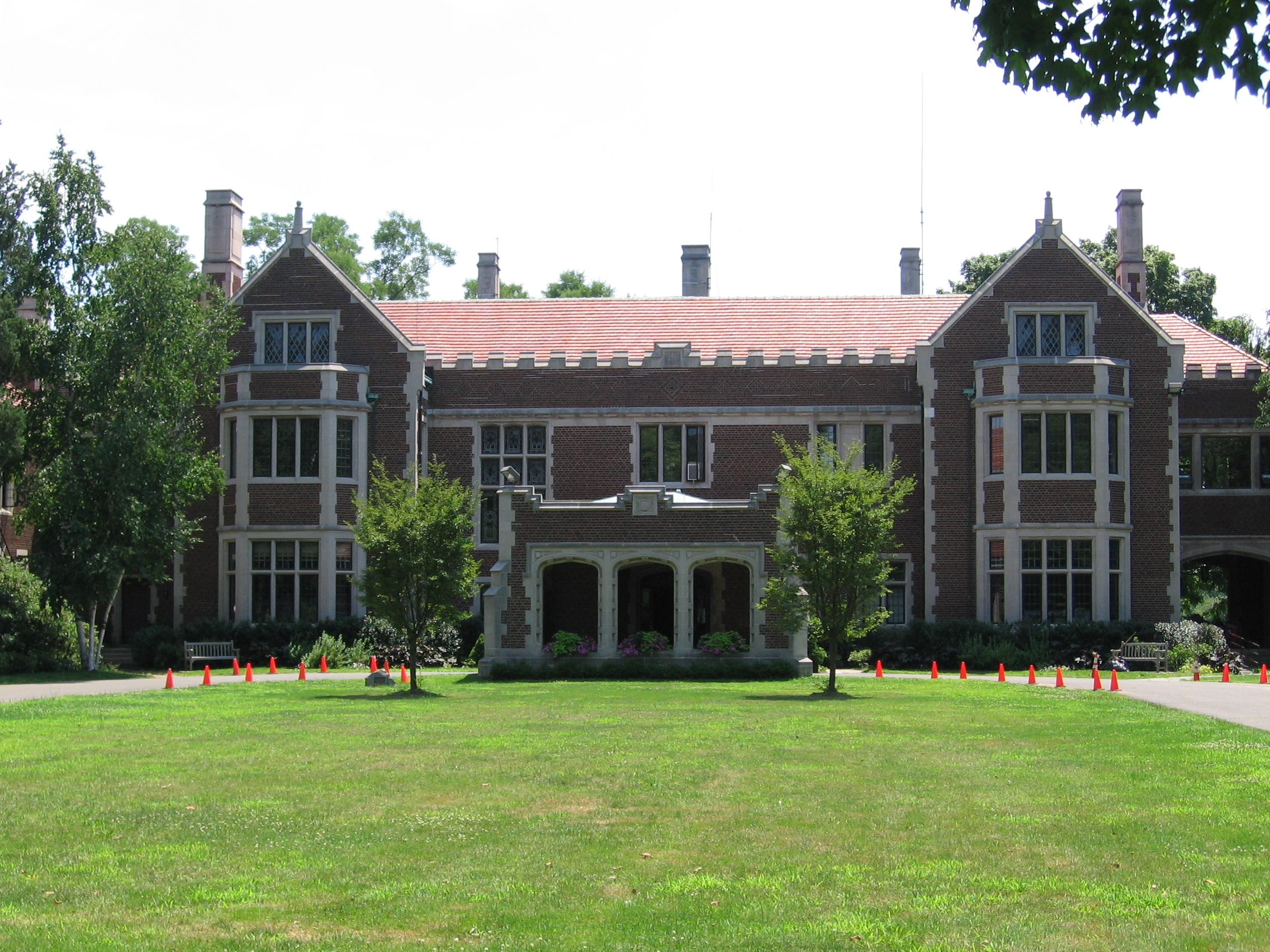
Waveny mansion in Waveny Park

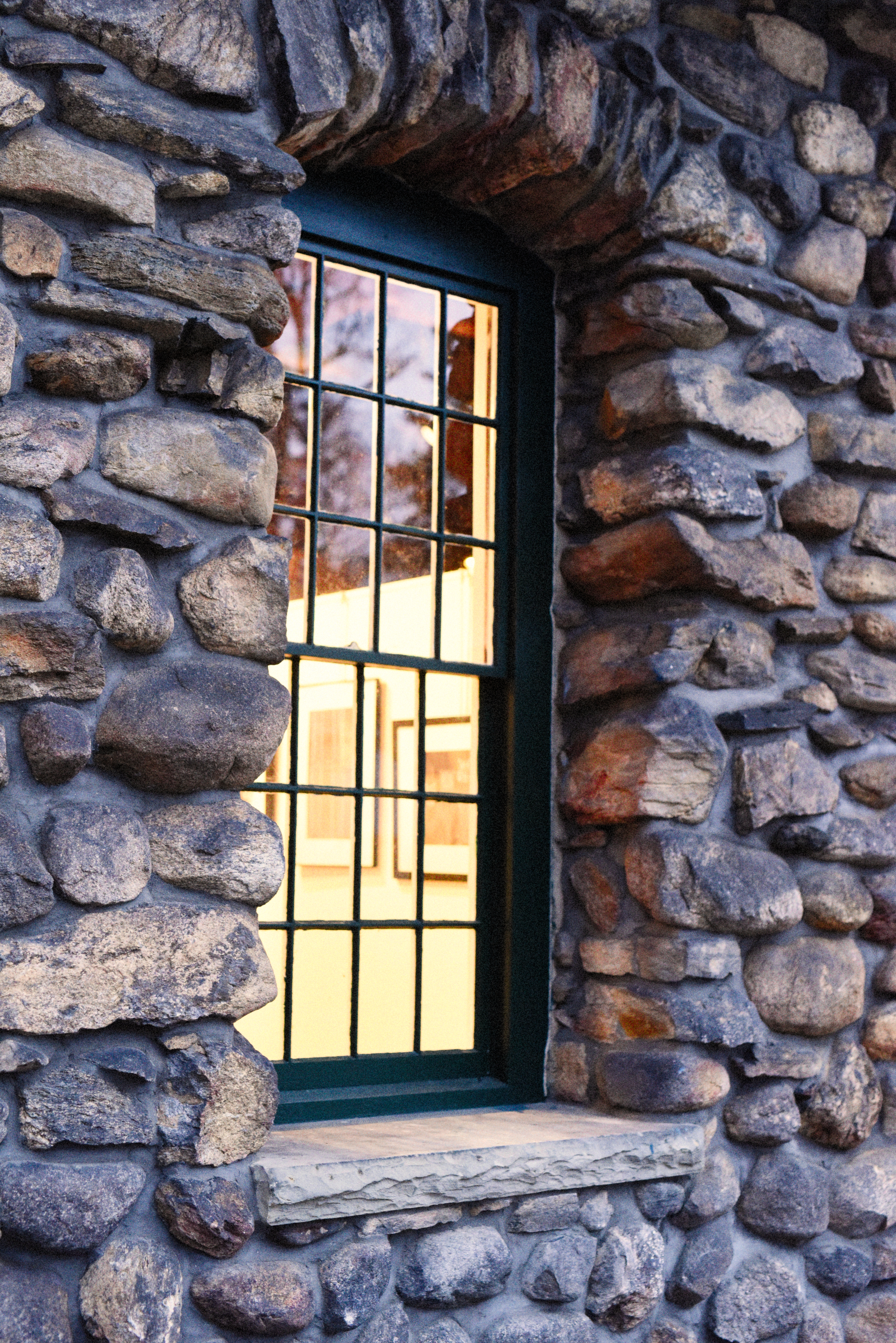
Waveny Park, window of the Carriage Barn Arts Center.
