= Dunnellen Hall =

Mansion in Connecticut, United States

- Estate grounds c. 2009
- Interactive map of the Dunnellen Hall area

General information
- Type: Mansion
- Architectural style: Jacobean
- Location: 521 Round Hill Road; Greenwich, Connecticut
- Coordinates: 41°6′44.33″N 73°39′56.92″W
- Completed: 1918
- Cost: US$1 million (1918)
- Owner: Private

Technical details
- Floor area: 17,000 ft^{2} (1,600 m^{2})

Design and construction
- Architect: William B. Tubby

Dunnellen Hall is a private mansion located at 521 Round Hill Road in Greenwich, Connecticut, USA. It was sold by the estate of Leona Helmsley for $35 million, down from the original asking price of $125 million when it was first put up on the market in 2008.

Dunnellen Hall was built for New York City financier Daniel G. Reid as a gift for his daughter in 1918. Dunnellen Hall was built for approximately $1 million. The approximately 23,000-square-foot (2,100 m^{2}) mansion originally sat on over 200 acres (0.81 km^{2}), but is currently situated on just over 40. It was purchased in 1983 by Leona Helmsley and her husband Harry for US$11 million. Leona Helmsley would live in Dunnellen Hall until her death in 2007. According to the Greenwich Historical Society, Dunnellen Hall is one of the last intact historic estates left in Greenwich.

== 21st century renovations ==
Between 2011 and 2014, the mansion's square footage was decreased from 23,000 square feet (2,100 m^{2}) to approximately 17,000 square feet (1,600 m^{2}) due to renovations including the demolition of the indoor pool covered by a dance floor constructed by the Helmsleys. Two outdoor fountains, including a large external front entrance one, were also removed. Many of the interior rooms were refurbished and/or updated to a more modern appearance, removing the darker mahogany wood tones of the Helmsley era. The once grand dual staircase is now a singular staircase structure opening from the main entrance to the second floor.

As of October 2019, the estate was listed for sale for US$16.5 million.
