= National Register of Historic Places listings in Hempstead (town), New York =

This is a list of all National Register of Historic Places listings in the Town of Hempstead in Nassau County, New York. The locations of National Register properties for which the latitude and longitude coordinates are included below, may be seen in an online map.

== Listings ==
| | Name on the Register | Image | Date listed | Location | City or town | Description |
|---|---|---|---|---|---|---|
| 1 | Bellerose Village Municipal Complex | Bellerose Village Municipal Complex | September 28, 2006 (#06000889) | 50 Superior Road and Magee Plaza; 40°43′21″N 73°43′01″W | Bellerose | |
| 2 | Denton Homestead | Denton Homestead | November 12, 2014 (#14000913) | 60 Denton Ave. 40°38′33″N 73°39′54″W | East Rockaway | Built Ca 1795 as a tavern, it later become a residence |
| 3 | Haviland-Davison Grist Mill | Haviland-Davison Grist Mill | April 21, 1998 (#98000352) | Jct. of Woods and Denton Avenues; 40°38′47″N 73°39′49″W | East Rockaway | |
| 4 | House at 251 Rocklyn Avenue | House at 251 Rocklyn Avenue | November 7, 2008 (#07001454) | 251 Rocklyn Avenue; 40°39′07″N 73°39′54″W | Lynbrook | |
| 5 | House at 474 Ocean Avenue | House at 474 Ocean Avenue | November 7, 2008 (#07001455) | 474 Ocean Avenue; 40°39′15″N 73°39′29″W | Lynbrook | |
| 6 | House at 73 Grove Street | House at 73 Grove Street | January 23, 2008 (#07001453) | 73 Grove Street; 40°39′54″N 73°40′02″W | Lynbrook | |
| 7 | John Jackson II House | | January 19, 2022 (#100007370) | 1419 Wantagh Ave. 40°41′16″N 73°30′34″W | Wantagh | |
| 8 | Samuel and Elbert Jackson House | Samuel and Elbert Jackson House | July 14, 2006 (#06000563) | 1542 Wantagh Avenue; 40°41′04″N 73°30′39″W | Wantagh | |
| 9 | Franklin Square National Bank | Franklin Square National Bank | November 10, 2015 (#15000776) | 952 Hempstead Turnpike; 40°42′27″N 73°40′39″W | Franklin Square | 1926 bank building expanded at midcentury under leadership of Arthur T. Roth, who made many consumer-friendly innovations such as an outdoor teller's window and a bank credit card |
| 10 | Hempstead Town Hall | Hempstead Town Hall | May 7, 2018 (#100002384) | 350 Front Street; 40°42′23″N 73°37′12″W | Hempstead | 1918 Town Hall replaced by building on 1 Washington Street in 1967. Both buildings are still in use. |
| 11 | Jerusalem District No. 5 Schoolhouse | Jerusalem District No. 5 Schoolhouse | March 1, 1996 (#96000204) | Old Jerusalem Road; 40°42′08″N 73°30′27″W | Levittown | One room schoolhouse |
| 12 | Jones Beach State Park, Causeway and Parkway System | Jones Beach State Park, Causeway and Parkway System | April 28, 2005 (#05000358) | Ocean, Wantagh, Meadowbrook and Loop State Parkways; 40°36′51″N 73°32′10″W | Wantagh | Early Robert Moses project in late 1920s opened Long Island beaches to public and led to many more Long Island state parks and parkways |
| 13 | George Sumner Kellogg House | George Sumner Kellogg House | August 18, 2017 (#100001486) | 960 Merrick Rd. 40°39′03″N 73°36′31″W | Baldwin | |
| 14 | Lynbrook Public Library | | August 27, 2025 (#100012187) | 56 Eldert Street; 40°39′15″N 73°40′27″W | Lynbrook | |
| 15 | Mitchel Air Base and Flight Line | Mitchel Air Base and Flight Line | May 4, 2018 (#100002385) | Roughly Charles Lindbergh Blvd., Ellington Ave., East & West Rds. 40°43′51″N 73°35′46″W | Garden City | One of the first U.S. airbases established in 1918; since decommissioning in 1961 has been redeveloped into part of Nassau Community College campus and Cradle of Aviation Museum |
| 16 | Nassau County Courthouse | Nassau County Courthouse | March 2, 2021 (#100006213) | 262 Old Country Rd. 40°44′21″N 73°38′05″W | Mineola | |
| 17 | Old Nassau County Courthouse | Old Nassau County Courthouse | February 17, 1978 (#78001863) | 1550 Franklin Avenue; 40°44′16″N 73°38′24″W | Garden City | |
| 18 | Pagan-Fletcher House | Pagan-Fletcher House | September 8, 1983 (#83001715) | 143 Hendrickson Avenue; 40°40′12″N 73°41′52″W | Valley Stream | |
| 19 | Rectory of St. George's Episcopal Church | Rectory of St. George's Episcopal Church | May 3, 1988 (#88000510) | 217 Peninsula Boulevard; 40°42′18″N 73°37′18″W | Hempstead | |
| 20 | Rock Hall | Rock Hall | November 21, 1976 (#76001230) | 199 Broadway; 40°36′32″N 73°44′05″W | Lawrence | |
| 21 | Rockville Cemetery and Bristol and Mexico Monument | Rockville Cemetery and Bristol and Mexico Monument | November 16, 2015 (#15000801) | 45 Merrick Road; 40°39′31″N 73°39′41″W | Lynbrook | Burial ground started in 1799, for many early Near Rockaway settlers. Monuments to two nearby 1840s shipwrecks mark mass grave of 139 passengers, mostly Irish immigrants. |
| 22 | St. George's Church | St. George's Church | March 7, 1973 (#73001211) | 319 Front Street; 40°42′24″N 73°37′23″W | Hempstead | |
| 23 | St. Paul's German Presbyterian Church and Cemetery | St. Paul's German Presbyterian Church and Cemetery | September 26, 2008 (#08000931) | 525 Elmont Rd. 40°41′48″N 73°42′54″W | Elmont | |
| 24 | A. T. Stewart Era Buildings | A. T. Stewart Era Buildings | November 14, 1978 (#78001864) | 4th, 5th, and 6th Streets, Cathedral and Cherry Valley Avenues; 40°43′21″N 73°38′27″W | Garden City | |
| 25 | US Post Office-Freeport | US Post Office-Freeport | May 11, 1989 (#88002517) | 132 West Merrick Road; 40°39′13″N 73°35′10″W | Freeport | |
| 26 | US Post Office-Garden City | US Post Office-Garden City | May 11, 1989 (#88002521) | 600 Franklin Street; 40°43′29″N 73°38′04″W | Garden City | |
| 27 | US Post Office-Hempstead | US Post Office-Hempstead | November 17, 1988 (#88002499) | 200 Fulton Avenue; 40°42′26″N 73°37′43″W | Hempstead | |
| 28 | US Post Office-Rockville Centre | US Post Office-Rockville Centre | May 11, 1989 (#88002425) | 250 Merrick Road; 40°39′22″N 73°38′48″W | Rockville Centre | |
| 29 | Wantagh Railroad Complex | Wantagh Railroad Complex | June 30, 1983 (#83001716) | 1700 Wantagh Avenue; 40°40′49″N 73°30′38″W | Wantagh | |

== See also ==
- National Register of Historic Places listings in New York
- National Register of Historic Places listings in Nassau County, New York
