= Suzanne Luna =

American producer and director

- Born: Long Island, New York
- Education: Adelphi University
- Occupations: producer, director, writer
- Years active: 1988 – present
- Organization: Unperfect Productions
- Notable work: The Ellen DeGeneres Show; Momhead
- Awards: Daytime Emmy Award for Outstanding Talk Show/Entertainment (2014) (2015) (2017)

Suzanne Luna is an American producer and director best known for The Ellen DeGeneres Show.

== Early life and influences ==
Luna was born in Queens, NY and raised on Long Island, New York, where she attended Lynbrook Senior High School in Long Island, New York. She then earned a degree at Adelphi University with a major in film and television and a minor in French.

== Career ==
Luna is best known for producing The Ellen DeGeneres Show. In 2010, she served as the field segment director on four episodes before producing the series for the following seven years. In 2014, 2015, and 2017, she won the Daytime Emmy Award for Outstanding Talk Show/Entertainment for producing and directing the show.

She began her career in New York City, where she directed full-length plays on Off-Broadway and Off-Off Broadway and served as script supervisor for top commercial directors in both New York and Los Angeles. She then transitioned to filmmaking and began her own directing career.

In 2003, Luna was named by Boards Magazine as "One of the Next 20 Directors to Watch". Jonathan Whitehead stated in an interview, "Suzanne Luna's body of work is all light hearted, tongue in cheek, humor. She has a touch for getting a great performance and good comedic timing out of a talent performance project."

In 2013, Unperfect Productions, the all-female production company formed by Suzanne Luna and Johanna Stein, produced the 24-episode series Life of Mom with Johanna Stein for Yahoo!. In 2014, they produced the viral video Momhead. Luna directed and edited the 2014 viral comedy video Momhead. It received over 2.7 million views on YouTube and was featured on CNN, The TODAY Show, The Huffington Post, and The Doctors.

In 2016, they produced the 18-episode series JoJoHead in collaboration with Warner Bros.' Blue Ribbon Content digital studio, for which Luna served as director and executive producer. The show features comedic vignettes about the life of an everyday woman and is a prequel to Momhead. Both Momhead and JoJoHead were filmed from a bird's eye view using a GoPro camera on top of Stein's head. JoJoHead was released on CW Seed, The CW's streaming platform, in 2016. It was also promoted through weekly Instagram Stories on the CW Seed's Instagram account. That same year, Unperfect Productions also produced One in a Million, a public service announcement to raise awareness about domestic violence.

In 2017, Luna produced It's Illogical, a series of public service announcements that highlight the illogicality of sexual assault. The series was produced by 101-North for It's On Us, the organization created by Joe Biden to stop sexual assault. The spots received over 15 million views globally.

== Filmography ==
=== Film ===
| Year | Title | Role | Note(s) |
|---|---|---|---|
| 1988 | Last Rites | Production Assistant | |
| 2005 | Beautiful Things | Director, producer | Short Film |
| 2008 | Ellen's Even Bigger Really Big Show | Segment Director | TV movie |
| 2009 | Ellen's Bigger, Longer, and Wilder Show | Field Producer | TV movie |
| 2011 | Untitled Bethenny Frankel Talk Show | Producer | TV movie |
| 2013 | Life of Mom with Johanna Stein | Director, executive producer | Video |
| 2014 | Momhead | Director, editor | Video |
| 2016 | One in a Million PSA | Director, writer (lyrics), producer | Video / PSA |
| 2017 | It's Illogical PSA | Producer | Video / PSA |

=== Television ===
| Year | Title | Role | Note(s) |
|---|---|---|---|
| 2010–17 | The Ellen DeGeneres Show | Producer (TV series), Field Segment Director | 134 episodes Won: Daytime Emmy Award for Outstanding Talk Show/Entertainment (2014) (2015) (2017) |
| 2014 | Kevin Nealon's Laugh Lessons | Supervising Producer | Episode: "Adam Sandler" |
| 2016 | JoJoHead | Director, executive producer | 18 episodes |

== Awards and nominations ==
| Year | Nominee / work | Award | Result |
|---|---|---|---|
| 2014 | The Ellen DeGeneres Show | Daytime Emmy Award for Outstanding Talk Show/Entertainment | Won |
| 2015 | The Ellen DeGeneres Show | Daytime Emmy Award for Outstanding Talk Show/Entertainment | Won |
| 2017 | The Ellen DeGeneres Show | Daytime Emmy Award for Outstanding Talk Show/Entertainment | Won |
