= Lynbrook Senior High School =

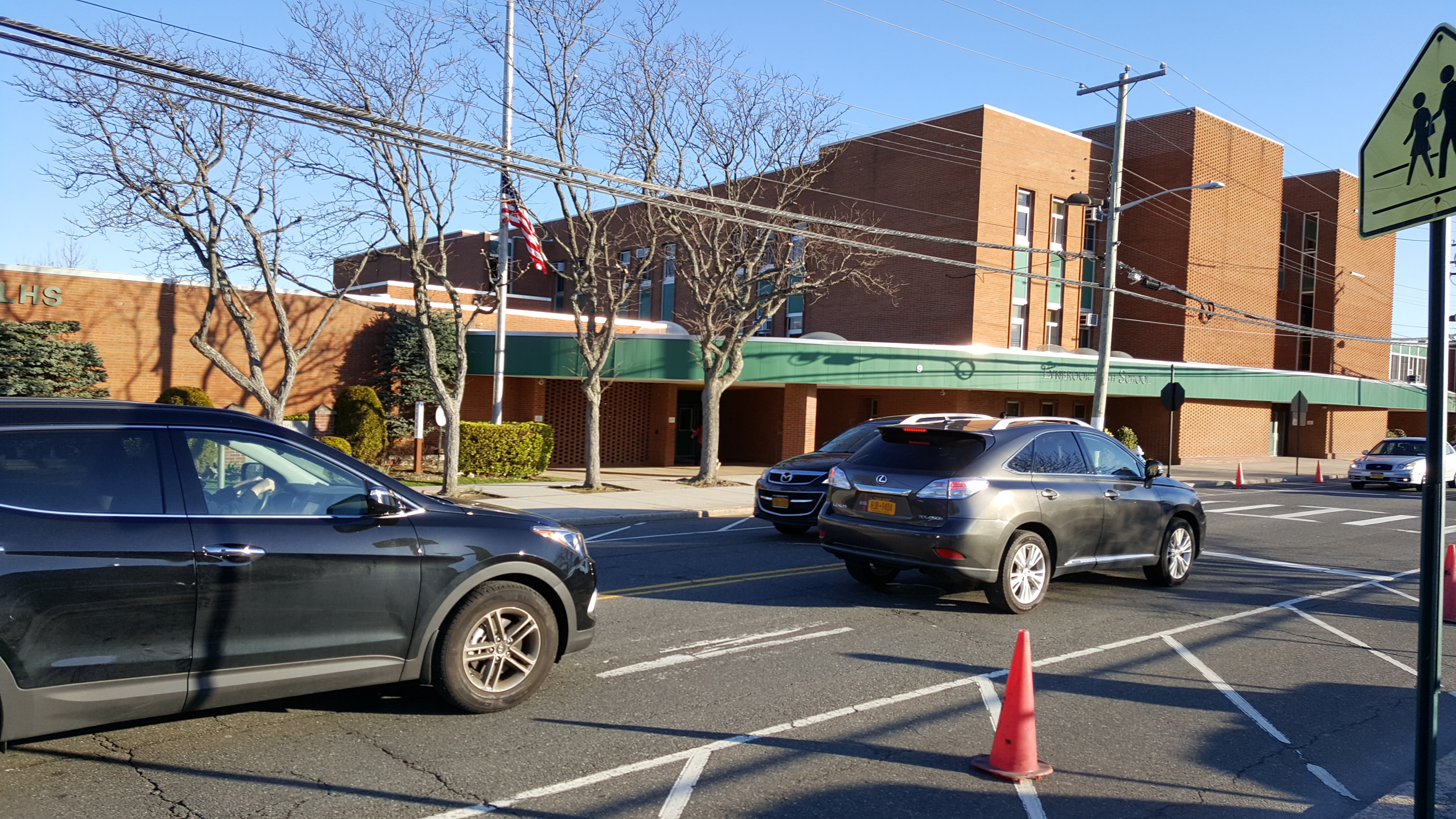

Location
- Coordinates: 40°39′14″N 73°40′21″W

Information
- Type: Public
- Opened: 1922
- School district: Lynbrook Union Free School District
- Superintendent: Paul J. Lynch
- Principal: Matthew Sarosy
- Teaching staff: 81.18 (FTE)
- Grades: 9-12
- Enrollment: 835 (2023–2024)
- Student to teacher ratio: 10.29
- Colors: Green and Gold
- Mascot: Owl
- Team name: Owls
- Website: lhs.lynbrookschools.org.

Lynbrook Senior High School (commonly known as Lynbrook High School) is the four-year public high school located in the village of Lynbrook, New York in Nassau County on Long Island. The school district serves the Village of Lynbrook, as well as parts of neighboring Hewlett, Hewlett Harbor, East Rockaway, as well as small portions of Malverne and Valley Stream.

As of the 2014-15 school year, the school had an enrollment of 906 students and 73.9 classroom teachers (on an FTE basis), for a student–teacher ratio of 12.3:1. There were 79 students (8.7% of enrollment) eligible for free lunch and 15 (1.7% of students) eligible for reduced-cost lunch.

Lynbrook High School was recognized by the United States Department of Education in the 1990-1991 school year as a Blue Ribbon School of Excellence.

Lynbrook Senior High School offers a wide range of academics, and class sizes are typically small, with an average of 250 to 300 students per grade.

The school produces many All-County athletes and musicians, has won many county and state team sport championships, and has an award-winning high school newspaper, Horizon.

== District history ==
The first school serving the area was built on the present site of the East Rockaway Town Hall. The first school in what is now the Lynbrook School District, then Pearsall's Corner, was built most probably in 1855 (a picture of the first school house is dated c. 1865) and expanded in 1874. The Union Free School District was established in 1892 and construction was begun near the site now occupied by the Administrative Offices. Professor Charles D. Vosburgh was its first Superintendent. In 1909 a new brick building was built next to the old building. It served grades 1–12. In 1922, a new high school was built across the street. It is still the core of the present Lynbrook High School, the oldest continually occupied high school on Long Island. It has been modified and expanded a number of times. Some older, former high school buildings exist, but have been repurposed.

== Notable alumni ==
- Alan Colmes (graduated 1968), talk show host
- Pamela Geller (graduated 1976), blogger, author, political activist, and commentator
- Richard Ned Lebow (graduated 1959), political scientist, author, and professor
- Suzanne Luna, producer and director
- Raymond J. Barry, actor
- Harloe (graduated 2010), singer and songwriter
