= Mineola Fairgrounds =

Former fairgrounds and racing venue in Garden City, New York

- Address: Old Country Road and Washington Avenue
- Location: Garden City, Nassau County, New York, U.S.
- Operator: Queens County Agricultural Society
- Type: Fairgrounds and racing venue
- Surface: Dirt (racing track)
- Acreage: 65
- Current use: Nassau County Court Complex

Construction
- Opened: 1866

Mineola Fairgrounds was a fairground and exhibition center located in present-day Garden City, Nassau County, New York, United States. Established in 1866, the grounds hosted agricultural fairs and various sporting events before being redeveloped into the Nassau County Courthouse.

== History ==
=== Founding and early years ===
The land that became known as the Mineola Fairgrounds was acquired in 1866 by the Queens County Agricultural Society, which had been established in 1841 to sponsor local agricultural exhibitions. It was situated on Old Country Road at Washington Avenue, in present-day Garden City, New York. The original fairgrounds were funded through public subscriptions and included livestock barns, carriage sheds, a business office, and an exhibition hall. Additional land was added to the fairgrounds in 1884. In 1893, the Queens County Agricultural Society enlarged the Mineola Fairgrounds again by buying 26 acres from the Garden City Company for $10,000. The tract covered an area from the western boundary of the fairgrounds to within a few feet of the railroad between Mineola and Garden City. The purchase brought the total size of the fairgrounds to 65 acres.

=== County Fair ===
Originally known as the Queens County Fair, the first agricultural exhibition was held at the Mineola Fairgrounds in 1866. Much of Long Island was farmland at the time, and its residents began bringing their best crops and livestock to the Mineola Fairgrounds for the event. Farmers from Brooklyn to the East End of Long Island were attracted to the fairgrounds to see the latest farming equipment and take part in competitions. When Nassau County was formed in 1899, the fair was renamed from the Queens County Fair to the Mineola Fair.

The site served as fairgrounds for over 80 years. The final fair held at the Mineola Fairgrounds took place in September 1952, before the event moved to Roosevelt Raceway. It later became known as the Long Island Fair.

=== Sporting events ===
The first polo match held on Long Island took place in the infield of the Mineola Fairgrounds track in 1879, with Thomas Hitchcock Sr. among the players. Members of the community continued playing at the Mineola Fairgrounds, eventually forming the Meadowbrook Polo Club, which was formally incorporated in 1881.

The Nassau Driving Club, a group of harness racing enthusiasts based in Nassau and Queens counties, held its first matinee races on the Mineola Fairgrounds track on May 29, 1909. Several hundred spectators witnessed the five events on the card which featured trotting and pacing.

Annie Oakley gave her final shooting exhibition at the Mineola Fairgrounds racetrack on July 3, 1922. Vaudeville performer Fred Stone participated alongside Oakley.

=== Greyhound racing ===
Nightly Greyhound races were inaugurated at the Mineola Fairgrounds track on May 29, 1929. Approximately 5,000 people were in attendance for the opening of the 90-day meeting held by the Nassau Kennel Club. The venue became a dog racing center in the New York metropolitan area with spectators coming from Nassau, Queens, Suffolk, and Kings counties, as well as the Bronx, Manhattan, and New Jersey. Percy Campbell Reed was owner of the dog-racing track at the Mineola Fairgrounds.

In June 1937, eight years of greyhound racing at the Mineola Fairgrounds came to an end following action by New York Governor Herbert Lehman against dog racing. Local efforts were led by Martin W. Littleton, then District Attorney of Nassau County. P. C. Reed, proprietor of the Nassau Kennel Club, was arrested on gambling charges over the track's use of the "option" betting system. The Mineola track was closed indefinitely with the closure affecting approximately 225 employees.

== Sale and redevelopment ==
The Queens–Nassau Agricultural Society transferred the deed to the 65-acre Mineola Fairgrounds to Nassau County for $50,000 in June 1938. Since the society had struggled to operate the annual fair at a profit, its board of directors believed that transferring the property would help preserve the fairgrounds for public use. The society retained the use of land south of a boundary drawn 150 feet north of the racetrack. It was also permitted to continue holding the county fair on the grounds for at least 10 years. County Executive J. Russell Sprague announced plans to eventually establish a civic center on the grounds. A selection of the pre-existing buildings on the fairgrounds were demolished and others moved to new sites to clear the area to be controlled by the county government. Groundbreaking ceremonies were held for a new government building on August 2, 1938. A year later, the cornerstone of the new $2,600,000 Nassau County Courthouse building was laid on the premises during the summer of 1939. The rest of the fairgrounds were demolished in 1951 to be replaced by the present-day Nassau County Court Complex.
