= St. Paul's German Presbyterian Church and Cemetery =

Historic church and cemetery in Nassau County, New York

- U.S. National Register of Historic Places
- New York State Register of Historic Places
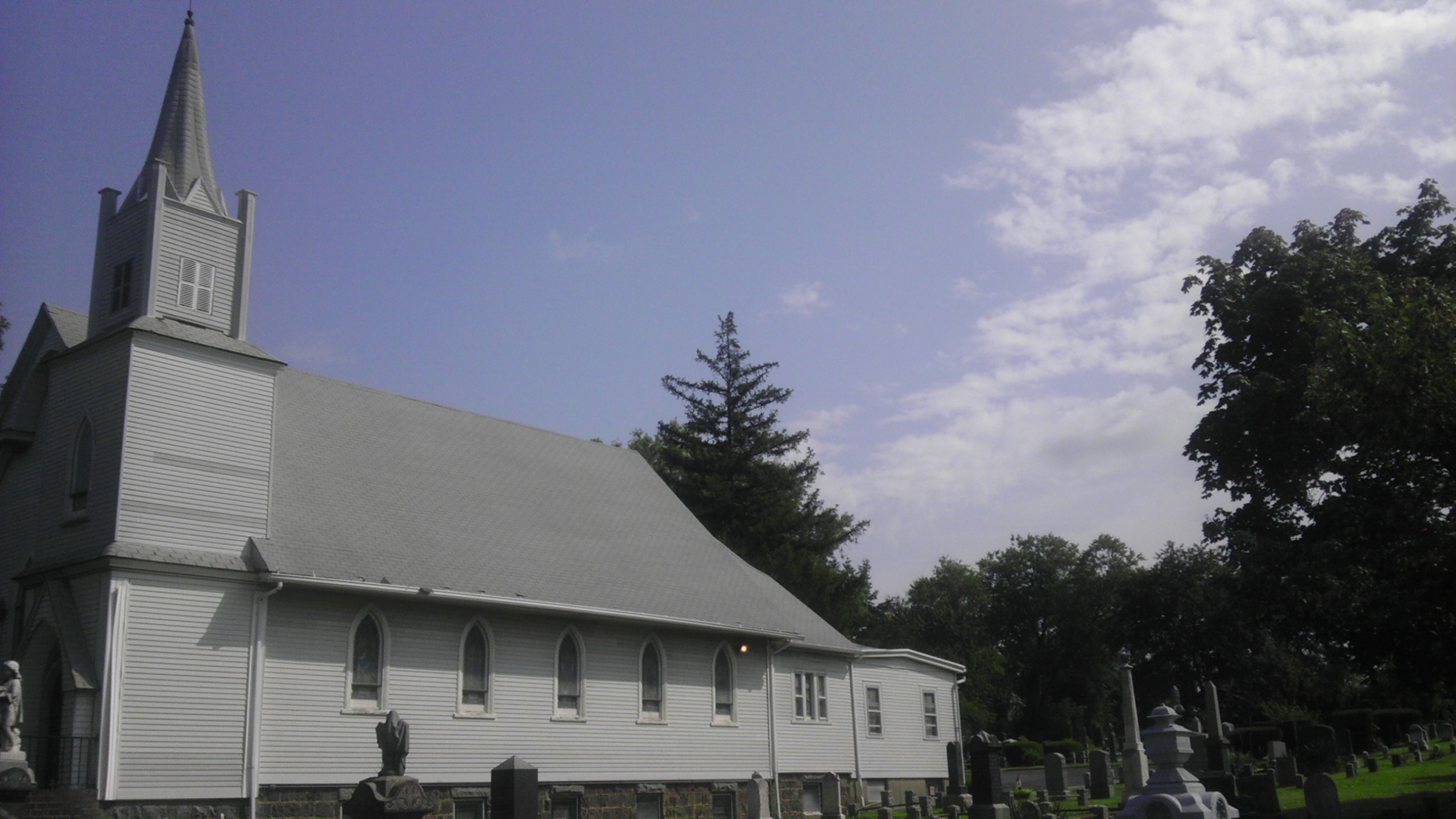

- Location within New York Location within the United States
- Location: 525 Elmont Road, Elmont, New York
- Coordinates: 40°41′47″N 73°42′51″W
- Area: 1.6 acres (0.65 ha)
- Built: 1904
- Architectural style: Gothic
- NRHP reference No.: 08000931

Significant dates
- Added to NRHP: September 26, 2008
- Designated NYSRHP: July 30, 2008

The St. Paul's German Presbyterian Church and Cemetery is a historic place in Elmont, New York. It was added to the New York State and National Registers of Historic Places in 2008.

It is one of just a few buildings that remain from the area's longstanding German community.

== See also ==
- National Register of Historic Places listings in Hempstead (town), New York
- Jamaica First German Presbyterian Church
