= East Rockaway High School =

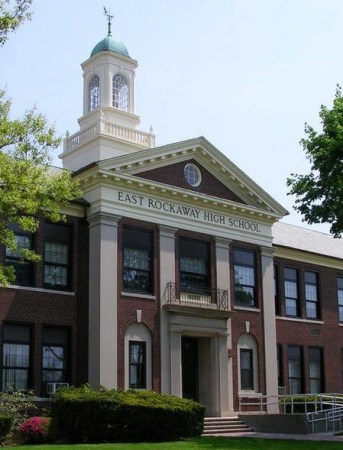

Location
- 443 Ocean Avenue; East Rockaway, (Nassau County), New York 11518; United States; 40°38′46″N 73°39′26″W

Information
- Type: Public secondary school
- School district: East Rockaway School District
- NCES School ID: 360996000769
- Principal: Richard Schaffer
- Staff: 57.29 (FTE)
- Grades: 7–12
- Enrollment: 577 (2023–2024)
- Student to teacher ratio: 10.07
- Colors: Orange and Black
- Team name: Rocks
- Feeder schools: Centre Ave., Rhame Ave., and St. Raymond elementary schools
- Website: Official website

East Rockaway Junior-Senior High School (ERHS) is a six-year public secondary school in East Rockaway, New York, and the sole high school in East Rockaway School District. As of the 2023-24 school year, the school enrolled 577 students.

== Athletics ==
East Rockaway High School's athletic teams are known as the "Rocks" (and the "Lady Rocks") and have Division IV teams in American football, baseball, volleyball, softball, basketball, and track and field. The school's soccer and lacrosse teams are shared between itself and Malverne Senior High School. The school's mascot, The Rockman, is visually based on The Thing of the Fantastic Four. The school's colors are orange and black.

== Musicals ==
Every year, the students of ERHS, often inviting elementary students, stage a musical production. These productions include You're a Good Man, Charlie Brown (1989), Little Shop of Horrors (1990 and 2014), The Wizard of Oz (1991, 2010, and 2020), Peter Pan (1992 and 2002), Annie (1993 and 2004), Godspell (1994), The Sound of Music (1995 and 2011), Cinderella (1996), Bye Bye Birdie (1997 and 2019), Oliver! (1998 and 2009), Guys and Dolls (1999), The Music Man (2000), Mame (2001), Grease (2003), Hello, Dolly! (2005), Damn Yankees (2006), West Side Story (2007), City of Angels (2008), Crazy for You (2012), Seussical (2013), Willy Wonka and the Chocolate Factory (2015), Mary Poppins (2016), Shrek the Musical (2017), and The Little Mermaid (2018).

== Notable alumni ==
- Brian Keith, actor
- Don Murray, actor
