= Lynbrook Union Free School District =

School district in the U.S. state of New York

The Lynbrook Union Free School District is a public school district serving portions of the southwestern part of the Town of Hempstead. The school district includes most of the Village of Lynbrook and parts of the unincorporated areas of Lynbrook as well as portions of East Rockaway, Hewlett, Hewlett Harbor, and Valley Stream.

At one time the East Rockaway School District proposed paying the Lynbrook district to have East Rockaway students in grades 7 through 12 attend public schools in Lynbrook; the Lynbrook district rejected the offer.

== Schools ==
- Lynbrook Kindergarten Center
- West End Elementary School
- Waverly Park Elementary School
- Marion Street Elementary School
- Lynbrook North Middle School
- Lynbrook South Middle School
- Lynbrook Senior High School
