= Madagascar: A Little Wild =

2020s animated TV series

- Also known as: A Little Wild
- Genre: Comedy; Adventure
- Based on: Madagascar by Tom McGrath and Eric Darnell
- Developed by: Dana Starfield
- Voices of: Tucker Chandler; Amir O'Neil; Shaylin Becton; Luke Lowe
- Composer: Frederik Wiedmann
- Country of origin: United States
- Original language: English
- No. of seasons: 8
- No. of episodes: 50

Production
- Executive producer: Johanna Stein
- Producer: Dana Starfield
- Running time: 23 minutes
- Production company: DreamWorks Animation Television

Original release
- Network: Hulu; Peacock
- Release: September 7, 2020 – June 30, 2022

Madagascar: A Little Wild (also known as A Little Wild) is an American animated television series produced by DreamWorks Animation Television and animated by Mainframe Studios. The series, which is a prequel to the 2005 film, features Alex the Lion, Marty the Zebra, Gloria the Hippo, and Melman the Giraffe residing in a rescue habitat at the Central Park Zoo as children. The series premiered on Hulu and Peacock on September 7, 2020.

Unlike The Penguins of Madagascar and All Hail King Julien, the series features all four zoo animals (here called the Zoosters) in main roles (both prior series had only Alex appear in guest roles), and does not feature an appearance in any form from either the Penguins, the Lemurs, or the Chimps.

== Characters ==
=== Main ===
- Alex (voiced by Tucker Chandler) is a lion cub and is the leader of the Zoosters. He loves performing for big crowds and is always excited about going on big adventures with his friends.
- Marty (voiced by Amir O'Neil) is a zebra foal and is Alex's best friend. He's very well-organized and is very strict about safety and following the rules. He dreams of being a ranger horse someday.
- Gloria (voiced by Shaylin Becton) is a hippopotamus calf and is the only female Zooster. Like Alex, she loves to perform, which is mostly dancing and swimming. She is very kind and caring and also serves as the muscle of the Zoosters, though she often gets distracted by other things that interest her.
- Melman (voiced by Luke Lowe) is a giraffe calf. Unlike the rest of his friends, he tends to be in his own little world and tends to get the most enjoyment out of things that other Zoosters may find boring. He tends to love Kate the most as he appreciates everything she does to take care of him. He also has a fear of butterflies.

=== Supporting ===
- Ant'ney (voiced by Eric Petersen) is a street-wise adult pigeon who is friends with the Zoosters. He delivers any big news to the Zoosters that he hears on the streets of New York City and sometimes helps them out on their adventures. His favorite activity is finding food laying on the ground and eating it.
- Pickles and Dave (both voiced by Candace Kozak) are brother and sister chimpanzees who live in the trees in the same habitat as the Zoosters. Pickles is a very tomboyish monkey, while her brother, Dave, is deaf and communicates through American Sign Language. They have a secret lever in their tree that they use to open a secret tunnel allowing the Zoosters to go out into the city, but only after the Zoosters pay them a toll. They are based on Phil and Mason from the movies.
- Kate (voiced by Jasmine Gatewood) is the Zookeeper of the New York Zoo. It's her duty to take care of all the animals at the zoo as best she can. Alex, Marty, Gloria and Melman are her favorites, with Melman being the one who loves her back the most.

=== Recurring ===
- Carlos (voiced by Eric Lopez) is another employee in the zoo who often acts as Kate's second-in-command, but oftentimes, he doesn't know what he's doing.
- Ranger Hoof (voiced by Da'Vine Joy Randolph) is a military horse who often visits the New York Zoo. Marty idolizes her and dreams of being a ranger horse just like her.
- Lucia (voiced by Myrna Velasco) is a sloth who was introduced in Season 3 of the show. She's very excitable and loves to teach the Zoosters about things she learned in her homeland, but she also loves to learn new things as well.
- Lala (voiced by Grace Lu) is a Chinese litter frog tadpole who was introduced in Season 3. She is very optimistic about having new experiences and ends up becoming Gloria's best friend, but Gloria is a bit obsessed and overprotective with her.
- Murray (voiced by Charlie Adler) and Millie (voiced by Johanna Stein) are an old married couple who live around the city. Murray is the only human in New York City who notices the Zoosters whenever they're out on the town, but his wife, Millie, doesn't ever believe him.

== Episodes ==
=== Series overview ===
| Season | Episodes | Originally released |
|---|---|---|
| 1 | 6 | September 7, 2020 |
| Special | | October 21, 2020 |
| 2 | 6 | December 11, 2020 |
| 3 | 7 | May 27, 2021 |
| 4 | 6 | August 6, 2021 |
| 5 | 6 | November 11, 2021 |
| Special | | November 26, 2021 |
| 6 | 6 | January 13, 2022 |
| 7 | 6 | April 4, 2022 |
| 8 | 7 | June 30, 2022 |

=== Season 1 (2020) ===
| No. overall | No. in season | Title | Directed by | Written by | Original release date |
|---|---|---|---|---|---|
| 1 | 1 | "The Bear Necessities" | Erik Kling | Dana Starfield | September 7, 2020 |
Set sometime after the flashback in the second movie, a kid loses his favorite teddy bear. The gang goes on a wild adventure through New York City to return it to him – and in the process Marty learns that some things in life can't be found in an instruction manual. (The episode title is a reference to the song The Bare Necessities from the Disney's The Jungle Book.) Song: Keep Going
| 2 | 2 | "Melman at the Movies" | Naz Ghodrati-Azadi | Roxy Simons | September 7, 2020 |
Melman finds a lucky flower and is convinced that today will be his Best Day Ever! But when a series of unlucky events threaten to ruin his day, he's faced with the choice to drown in his sorrows or “take back the day”! Song: Just Dust It Off
| 3 | 3 | "Everybody Loves a (Sea) Lion" | Erik Kling | Laura Zak | September 7, 2020 |
When the happy-go-lucky sea lions draw crowds away from his show, Alex decides that he needs to act like the Sea Lions. When Alex's attempts to compete with them don't bring back the crowds, he learns to be true to himself rather than try to be someone he's not (i.e. fish gotta swim, birds gotta fly, and lions gotta roar… and do backflips on land). Song: Spread Joy With Me & Gotta Make Them Roar
| 4 | 4 | "Hippo Lake" | Naz Ghodrati-Azadi & Robert Briggs | Roxy Simons | September 7, 2020 |
When Gloria sneaks into the NY Ballet to audition for "Swan Lake" and gets rejected (not for her dancing, but because she's a hippo), Gloria's belief in herself is tested. With some help from her friends, Gloria learns that she doesn't need someone else to decide she's a prima hipporina – she already is one, no matter what anyone thinks! Song: Shine & Swan Lake
| 5 | 5 | "Best Fans Forever" | Erik Kling | Benjamin Lapides | September 7, 2020 |
The gang heads to "Best Fans Day" at NY's Giraffe Stadium, where Alex gets caught up in the attention of rooting for the winning team. When his behavior ends up hurting Marty's feelings, Alex comes to learn that the only team that matters is the one that's made up of his friends. Song: Let’s Go Team!
| 6 | 6 | "Gloriasaurus" | Craig George | Adam Wilson & Melanie Wilson LaBracio | September 7, 2020 |
The gang heads to the Museum of Dinosaurs to help Kate with a big presentation. But Gloria becomes so obsessed with her handheld video game that she misses out on what's right in front of her, and ends up creating a disaster of colossal size! Song: What If, Gotta Win This Game & Do The Dino

=== Halloween Special (2020) ===
| Title | Directed by | Written by | Original release date |
|---|---|---|---|
| "A Fang-Tastic Halloween" | Erik Kling | Roxy Simons | October 21, 2020 |
After hearing spooky rumors about the new habitat resident — a bat! — Marty is determined to protect his friends from the newcomer. But when the bat helps him out of a tough situation, Marty learns it's better to get to know someone rather than judge them on false stereotypes. Song: Scary Fun & Lead The Way

=== Season 2 (2020) ===
| No. overall | No. in season | Title | Directed by | Written by | Original release date |
|---|---|---|---|---|---|
| 7 | 1 | "A Tale Of Two Kitties" | Robert Briggs | Drew Champion & Jacob Moffat | December 11, 2020 |
Alex is mistaken for a Maine Coon and takes over its life in the penthouse; despite being very comfortable at first with his fancy-schmancy new life, Alex begins to miss his old life and learns that it's lonely at the top. Song: I Could Get Used To This
| 8 | 2 | "Fire Marshall Melman" | Robert Briggs | Laura Zak | December 11, 2020 |
On Junior Marshals' Day at the fire station, Melman gets stuck in a fire truck on its way to a real emergency; with Alex's help, Melman must overcome his fear of heights to help save a stuck cat and learn that even heroes get scared sometimes. Song: Shine (with Joey Lawrence vocals and one octave higher.)
| 9 | 3 | "Fancy Fifths" | Craig George | Lindsay Kerns | December 11, 2020 |
When Marty accidentally steals a pair of slippers from a department store, he plans an elaborate heist to return them; in doing so, he learns that in the end, owning up to one's mistakes is easier than trying to cover them up. Song: Fancy Fifths
| 10 | 4 | "Hedgehog Sitters Club" | Craig George | Kristy Grant | December 11, 2020 |
When a litter of hedgehogs is temporarily relocated to the habitat, Alex, Marty, Melman and Gloria become their babysitters; the mischievous hedgies quickly wreak total havoc in the habitat. Song: Your’e Already A Star
| 11 | 5 | "CupKate" | Erik Kling | Roxy Simons | December 11, 2020 |
Everyone has something amazing planned for Kate's birthday, but Melman's worried that his homemade gift won't measure up; while on a quest to get Kate her favorite cupcakes, Melman learns the gift doesn't matter as long as it comes from the heart. Song: The Sweetest Gift Comes From You
| 12 | 6 | "Pest Side Story" | Craig George | Dave Polsky | December 11, 2020 |
Gloria becomes determined to earn her Queen of Kindness Kidizen badge and welcomes some free-spirited rats who need a place to stay into the habitat before learning that it's okay to say no. Song: I Got You! & G.L.O.R.I.A

=== Season 3 (2021) ===
| No. overall | No. in season | Title | Directed by | Written by | Original release date |
|---|---|---|---|---|---|
| 13 | 1 | "Alex and the Behemoth" | Naz Ghodrati-Azadi & Robert Briggs | Sam Bissonnette | May 27, 2021 |
Alex heads to a Coney Island roller coaster and proves there are advantages to being small. Song: I’m Ready For The Big Time
| 14 | 2 | "I Love Lucia" | Craig George | Laura Zak | May 27, 2021 |
Marty gets jealous when Lucia the sloth arrives but then must keep her from leaving the habitat. (The episode’s title is a reference to the 1950’s comedy sitcom I Love Lucy). Song: Pura, Vida & We Miss You Lucia!
| 15 | 3 | "Happy Snooze Year" | Craig George | Roxy Simons | May 27, 2021 |
Melman misses his bedtime to watch the ball drop on New Year's Eve with his friends and have fun. Song: We Celebrate & Life Of The Party
| 16 | 4 | "A Tadpole Tale" | Robert Briggs & Naz Ghodrati-Azadi | Maria Escobedo | May 27, 2021 |
When a tadpole named Lala shows up in Gloria's tank, Gloria must learn to manage different friendships. Song: New Friends, Old Friends & Old And New Friends Mashup
| 17 | 5 | "Groundhog Day" | Craig George | Laura Zak | May 27, 2021 |
Gloria tries to make spring come early so that she can get the missing tail for her mermaid doll, but learns to embrace other plans. Song: I Write My Name In The Sky & Heat It Up
| 18 | 6 | "Whatever Floats Your Float" | Robert Briggs & Naz Ghodrati-Azadi | Laura Zak | May 27, 2021 |
Marty tries to figure out which float their new friend Odee Eliot should ride in the Animal Pride Parade. Note: This episode is based on Pride Month, and the special pride month song "Be Proud" was released on Apple Music and Spotify on May 28, 2021.
| 19 | 7 | "A Roar Is Born" | Erik Kling | Dana Starfield & Johanna Stein | May 27, 2021 |
Alex lands a role in a big Hollywood movie with his idol Harley Horns (Eric Stonestreet), but his idol is not who he seems. Song: I’m Ready For The Big Time & You Are Our Star

=== Season 4 (2021) ===
| No. overall | No. in season | Title | Directed by | Written by | Original release date |
|---|---|---|---|---|---|
| 20 | 1 | "The First Lost Tooth" | Erik Kling | Roxy Simons | August 6, 2021 |
When Melman loses his first tooth, he goes into the city to find it so he can get his present from the tooth fairy. Song: You Won My Heart Over
| 21 | 2 | "The Lone Park Ranger" | Erik Kling | Roxy Simons | August 6, 2021 |
Ranger Hoof invites Marty on a Junior Ranger trot, and he's determined to prove he has what it takes. Song: Follow My Lead
| 22 | 3 | "Year Of The Lion" | Robert Briggs and Mike Kunkel | Stacey Evans Morgan | August 6, 2021 |
Alex tries to become a star of the lunar new year show as a dragon. Song: Being A Star
| 23 | 4 | "A Froglet Tale" | Robert Briggs | Lindsay Kerns | August 6, 2021 |
After growing legs, Lala is ready to go on a big adventure with her friends; Lala meets a shark named Oggie (Michael Leon Wooley) and tries to help him get out of a net. Song: Let’s Find A Way To Help & Try Something New
| 24 | 5 | "Snow Day" | Craig George | Laura Zak | August 6, 2021 |
When a snowstorm blocks Kate from accessing the zoo, Melman tries to fill in for her. Song: Taking Lead & Keep Going
| 25 | 6 | "Hermit Fab" | Craig George & T.J. Sullivan | Laura Zak | August 6, 2021 |
Gloria meets Starlene (Alanis Morissette), a shy hermit crab with a big talent; Gloria tries to help her show off her amazing talent to the animals of NYC. Song: Go Big Or Go Home (in the tune and melody of Bang Bang (Jessie J, Ariana Grande and Nikki Minaj song.) but slight slower and jazzy.) & Ocean Calling featuring Alanis Morissette with Shaylin B in a duet

=== Season 5 (2021) ===
| No. overall | No. in season | Title | Directed by | Written by | Original release date |
|---|---|---|---|---|---|
| 26 | 1 | "A Frog Tale" | Erik Kling | Roxy Simons | November 11, 2021 |
After Lala has feet and is now heading to a bigger pond, Gloria tries to find a new tankmate to play with.
| 27 | 2 | "A Little Too Wild" | Erik Kling | Laura Zak | November 11, 2021 |
Melman is very nervous about his first Sleepover with his friends at a campout in a vacant part of the zoo.
| 28 | 3 | "Journey to the Secret Playground" | Mike Kunkel | Roxy Simons | November 11, 2021 |
The group gets bored of their old toys, but then they discovered a map to a secret playground, and they tried to find it before time runs out.
| 29 | 4 | "The Losing Game" | Erik Kling | Roxy Simons | November 11, 2021 |
The gang does a basketball tournament to see who's the best, but Gloria keeps on cheating so that she could win.
| 30 | 5 | "Pizza Pigeon" | Erik Kling | Lindsay Kerns | November 11, 2021 |
Alex prepares for a performance he always wanted, but Ant'ney's pizza problem made him viral, and invited to do the show but not Alex.
| 31 | 6 | "Library Lockout" | Craig George | Sam Bissonnette | November 11, 2021 |
When the gang asks Marty to read their new favorite mystery book to them, he doesn't want to because it would embarrass him badly.

=== Christmas Special (2021) ===
| Title | Directed by | Written by | Original release date |
|---|---|---|---|
| "Holiday Goose Chase" | Chad Van De Keere | Laura Zak | November 26, 2021 |
During the holiday time in the habitat, Melman is determined to add one more sticker to his yearly "Nice" list, but when he meets a gander who has been separated from his family, he and his gang embark on a wild goose chase around the city.

=== Season 6 (2022) ===
| No. overall | No. in season | Title | Directed by | Written by | Original release date |
|---|---|---|---|---|---|
| 32 | 1 | "Lost and Pound" | Craig George & Chad Van De Keene | Dave Polsky | January 13, 2022 |
Marty finds an arctic wolf puppy and tries to locate its owner before it's too late.
| 33 | 2 | "Strictly Salsa" | Mike Kunkel | Laura Zak | January 13, 2022 |
Gloria tries so hard to reunite a salsa loving parrot with her partner and learns a lesson in finding people.
| 34 | 3 | "King of the Humble" | Mike Kunkel | Roxy Simons | January 13, 2022 |
Alex thinks he's "King of the Jungle" by leading the gang to find Bartholomew the Bat but learns a lesson in helping his friends.
| 35 | 4 | "Ambulance Ambush" | Erik Kling | Roxy Simons | January 13, 2022 |
On the night of a toy car race in the park, Melman discovers his toy ambulance has a popped tire.
| 36 | 5 | "'Gloria's Got 'Em All'" | Craig George & Chad Van De Keere | Sam Bissonette | January 13, 2022 |
The gang gets some Critter Cards, NYC's latest craze, and Gloria wants to collect them all, but learns a lesson about finding toys when she tries to find Melman's missing card.
| 37 | 6 | "What About Bill" | Craig George & Chad Van De Keere | Lindsay Kerns | January 13, 2022 |
Bill the Flamingo moves into the guest habitat and finds the gang seeing Alex in an audition for a show.

=== Season 7 (2022) ===
| No. overall | No. in season | Title | Directed by | Written by | Original release date |
|---|---|---|---|---|---|
| 38 | 1 | "The Pigeon and The Egg" | Mike Kunkel | Laura Zak | April 4, 2022 |
With the help of the Zoo Crew, Ant'ney wants to prove to his Ma that he's responsible enough to move to his own nest by taking care of an egg.
| 39 | 2 | "Race to the Rangers" | Erik Kling | Roxy Simons | April 4, 2022 |
Ranger Hoof invites Marty to Junior Ranger Horse training to see how well he does, but Marty likes to do it by book.
| 40 | 3 | "Fine Art Flop" | Mike Kunkel | Sam Bissonette | April 4, 2022 |
At a painting exhibition at the NYC Art Museum, Melman worries that his style isn't up to snuff, so he seeks help form a fancy rat named Andre Jean.
| 41 | 4 | "The Daily Glo" | Mike Kunkel | Roxy Simons | April 4, 2022 |
Gloria's taking a new job as a minted journalist by creating a podcast, "The Daily Glo" so that she can get all the attention she needs.
| 42 | 5 | "The Secret of the Dumpling" | Craig George | Laura Zak | April 4, 2022 |
Alex decides to become a celebrity chef, but worries his food might not be the best.
| 43 | 6 | "A Lil Baa Country" | Erik Kling | Sam Bissonette | April 4, 2022 |
After hearing Melman sing an original country song, Ant'ney signs him up for a concert, but Melman's anxiety gets bigger, and he worries couldn't do it.

=== Season 8 (2022) ===
| No. overall | No. in season | Title | Directed by | Written by | Original release date |
|---|---|---|---|---|---|
| 44 | 1 | "Rats" | Mike Kunkel | Roxy Simons | June 30, 2022 |
When Rocky asks Alex to direct his musical about his great grandma, Alex accepts it despite that he doesn't have any experience with them.
| 45 | 2 | "Ant'Ney's Got Talent" | Erik Kling | Laura Zak | June 30, 2022 |
Ant'ney dreams of becoming a corner crooner on the ledge, but he must hide his true passion from his family with the help of his friends.
| 46 | 3 | "Beached" | Erik Kling | Dave Polsky | June 30, 2022 |
Gloria enters a surf festival at Jones Beach, and Marty spearheads a beach cleanup day to get another Junior Ranger badge.
| 47 | 4 | "Odd Frog Out" | Mike Kunkel | Sam Bissonnette | June 30, 2022 |
Gloria spends a day at the Central Park Pond with her friend Lala and meets her frog friends from her hibernation.
| 48 | 5 | "A Bronx (Zoo) Tale" | Craig George | Sam Bissonnette | June 30, 2022 |
Melman and his friends don't seem to be the same, so he finds a herd that looks just like him, but then realizes that his old friends also have his back no matter what.
| 49 | 6 | "Marty's Big Break" | Craig George | Roxy Simons | June 30, 2022 |
Marty decides to skip junior ranger training and become the first Zebra Ranger Horse to celebrate Earth Day but learns way more than what being a Ranger Horse is.
| 50 | 7 | "The Final Furtier" | T.J Sullivan | Laura Zak | June 30, 2022 |
Alex decides to go on an epic space adventure just like Thelma the Space Monkey (Mindy Sterling) so that he'll have a busy schedule like his friends and learns about the bond of friendship.

== Production ==
The series was first announced for Hulu and Peacock on January 17, 2020.

== Broadcast ==
Outside of the United States, it aired on Family Jr. in Canada on January 9, 2021 and on TiJi in France on September 3, 2022. The series aired on DreamWorks Channel Asia as part of the DW Jr. block in 2022. The series is available for Latin America, on HBO Max. The series is available for Australia, on Stan. It started airing on Cartoon network on October 4, 2022 in the Cartoonito generation in Turkey. The show aired on TV2 in Malaysia in 2023, however after its 4th season aired it got replaced with the show “Adventurous Fins.” And later in October the show came back.
