= JoJoHead =

- Genre: Comedy
- Created by: Johanna Stein
- Written by: Johanna Stein
- Directed by: Suzanne Luna
- Starring: Johanna Stein
- Composer: Danny Weinkauf
- Country of origin: United States
- Original language: English
- No. of seasons: 1
- No. of episodes: 18

Production
- Executive producers: Johanna Stein; Suzanne Luna
- Producer: Nicole Ettinger
- Editor: Cory Livingston
- Camera setup: GoPro
- Running time: 2 minutes
- Production companies: Blue Ribbon Content; Unperfect Productions

Original release
- Network: CW Seed

JoJoHead is a 2016 American comedy web series written and created by Johanna Stein, which debuted on October 14, 2016, on The CW's online streaming platform, CW Seed. It stars creator Johanna Stein as JoJo and features numerous guest stars over 18 episodes. The series is directed by Stein's producing partner, Suzanne Luna.

== Cast ==
=== Series regulars ===
- Johanna Stein as JoJo

=== Guest stars ===
- James Grace
- Timothy A. Bennett
- Brian Blondell
- Alison Martin
- Claire Proctor
- Christine Mini Chang
- Lori Collins
- Ali Elk
- Nicole Ettinger
- David Gassman
- Joy Gohring
- Brian Konowal
- Jerry Lambert
- Ellison Hinnen
- Fisher Hinnen
- Kate James
- Beth Littleford
- Brian Majestic
- Caisha Williams
- Brian Jordan Alvarez
- David Bock
- Tyler Booth
- Tom Choi
- Annie Chow
- Olivia Chow
- Michael Coleman
- Darius Delacruz
- J Ferguson
- Thomas Fowler
- Peter A. Hulne
- Carol Locatell
- Jane Morris
- Lori Nasso
- Apul Patel
- Tony Rodriguez
- Joe Shamel
- John Spezzano
- Michael Terrence
- Tracy Vilar
- Katherine Wallace
- Juzo Yoshida

== Production and release ==
JoJoHead was produced by Warner Bros.' Blue Ribbon Content digital studio and the all-female production company Unperfect Productions in 2016. The show features comedic vignettes about the life of an everyday woman and is a prequel to the creator's viral YouTube video Momhead in 2014 which received 2.7 million views. Both series were filmed from a bird's eye view using a GoPro camera on top of Stein's head. Johanna Stein likened the lead character JoJo, based on her life, to a female Mr. Bean.

The series was released on CW Seed, The CW's streaming platform, in 2016. It was also promoted through weekly Instagram Stories on the CW Seed's Instagram account.
