= Johanna Stein =

Canadian screenwriter

- Born: Winnipeg, Manitoba, Canada
- Education: American Film Institute; University of Winnipeg
- Occupations: Screenwriter, producer, director, actress, comedian
- Years active: 1991–present
- Organization: Unperfect Productions
- Website: http://jojostein.com

Johanna Stein is a Canadian screenwriter, director, animation showrunner, and actress.

== Early life ==
Stein was born and raised in Winnipeg, Manitoba, where she attended St. John's High School and the University of Winnipeg. She then relocated to the United States to attend the American Film Institute.

== Television and film projects ==
As an actress Stein has appeared on TV series including The Late Late Show, Curb Your Enthusiasm, and Madagascar: A Little Wild, and in feature films including Shoot or Be Shot and Mulholland Drive. As a writer, she has written for TV series, including Odd Squad, Kung Fu Panda: The Paws of Destiny, Home: Adventures with Tip and Oh, Spirit Riding Free, The Emperor's New School, WordGirl, American Dragon: Jake Long, O'Grady, G-Spot, and Breaker High.

In 2006, Stein was nominated for an Annie Award for Best Writing in an Animated Television Production for Nickelodeon's O'Grady. In 2015, she was nominated for a Primetime Emmy Award for Outstanding Short-Form Animated Program for Disney XD's Wander Over Yonder.

Stein directed and co-produced We're with the Band (2003), a 30-minute mockumentary that followed Alanis Morissette and her band around the country, and which was subsequently optioned and ordered to pilot by Comedy Central.

Stein was Executive Producer and Showrunner on Madagascar: A Little Wild (2018), a 52-episode prequel to DreamWorks' animated film franchise, Madagascar. The series was noted for its representation of Deaf characters and Deaf culture. The series was nominated the 2022 GLAAD Media Award for Outstanding Children's Programming. It was also nominated for and won Kidscreen Awards in 2020, 2021, and 2022.

In 2021, it was announced that Stein would develop an animated TV series for DreamWorks Animation based on Jimmy Fallon's children's books, Your Baby's First Word Will Be Dada and Everything is Mama.

== Literary projects ==
In 2014, Stein's book, How Not to Calm a Child on a Plane: And Other Lessons in Parenting from a Highly Questionable Source was published by Da Capo Press. How Not to Calm a Child on a Plane was optioned by Will Arnett's production company, Electric Avenue, as the basis of a sitcom for the CBS television network.

Stein's comedic essays have been published in the New York Times, Parents, Jezebel, and have appeared in anthologies including, Mortified: Love is a Battlefield and Afterbirth: Stories You Won't Read in a Parenting Magazine.

== Internet projects ==
Stein wrote, produced, and starred in Momhead, a comedy video which was filmed from a bird's eye view using a GoPro camera mounted on top of Stein's head. The video chronicled all of the ways that Stein's 4-year-old daughter insulted her in a typical day. It received a Silver Pencil award from The One Club.

Momhead was adapted into a short-form series, Jojohead (2016). Stein wrote, produced, and starred in the 18-episode series which was a co-production of Unperfect Productions and Blue Ribbon Content (a subsidiary of Warner Bros. Television Studios). Jojohead was released on The CW's streaming platform, CW Seed, and was the first scripted series to be promoted through Instagram's Weekly Stories.

Stein wrote and directed It's Illogical (2017), a series of short films about sexual assault victim blaming. The PSA's, which were released by then-VP Joe Biden's initiative, It's On Us, received over 15 million views globally, and received a Communication Arts Award of Excellence.

== Filmography ==
=== Film ===
Year	Title	Role	Notes
1991	True Confections	Girl	TV movie
1994	The Silence of the Hams	Assistant (Mr. Greggio)	
1995	Bushwhacked	Assistant (Mr. Stern)	
1996	Iris and Nathan	Iris	Short Film
1997	Alanis Morissette: Jagged Little Pill (Live)	Additional Photographer	Video
2000	Radio Free Steve	Actress	
2001	Porno Outtakes	Writer, producer, Director, Editor, Script Supervisor	Video
2001	Mulholland Drive	Woman in #12	
2002	Shoot or Be Shot	Rachel	
2002	Le mime	Writer, The Mime	Short Film
2004	Alanis Morissette: We're with the Band	Director, executive producer, Writer	TV movie
2006	I Want Someone to Eat Cheese With	Co-Executive Producer	
2013	Life of Mom with Johanna Stein	Writer (creator), Executive Producer, Herself	Video
2014	Momhead	Writer, director, Producer, Herself	Video
2016	One in a Million PSA	Producer	Video / PSA
2017	It's Illogical PSA	Writer, director	Video / PSA

=== Television ===
Year	Title	Role	Notes
1996	Quick Witz	Herself	
1997–1998	Breaker High	Writer (staff writer)	
2000	Ripe Tomatoes	Writer (creator), Actress	
2000–2003	Seven Little Monsters	Writer	
2002	The Late Late Show with Craig Kilborn	Herself	Episode: 12 March 2002
2002	Comedy Central Canned Ham	Austin Girl Wannabe / Host	2 episodes
2004	The 33rd Annual Juno Awards	Director (comedy short segments), Writer	TV special
2004	Last Laugh '04	Consultant	
2004–2005	O'Grady	Writer	3 episodes
2005	Toupou	Writer (head writer)	25 episodes
2005	Curb Your Enthusiasm	Wife #2	Episode: "The Korean Bookie"
2007	Shorty McShorts' Shorts	Writer	Episode: "Too Many Robots"
2007	American Dragon: Jake Long	Writer	Episode: "Shaggy Frog"
2007	WordGirl	Writer	Episode: "Coupon Madness/When Life Gives You Potatoes..."
2007	The Emperor's New School	Writer	2 episodes
2009	G-Spot	Writer	5 episodes
2013–2014	Wander Over Yonder	Writer (story), Writer	14 episodes
2014	KCAL 9 News Weekend Report	Herself (guest)	Episode: May 11, 2014
2016	JoJoHead	JoJo, Executive Producer, Writer	18 episodes
2017	Home: Adventures with Tip & Oh	Writer (staff writer), Writer (story by)	22 episodes
2018–2019	Kung Fu Panda: The Paws of Destiny	Writer	4 episodes
2019	Spirit Riding Free: Pony Tales	Writer	Episode: "The Frontier Fillies Summer Outdoor Jubilee"
2020	Spirit Riding Free: Riding Academy	Writer	4 episodes
2020–2021	Madagascar: A Little Wild	Actress, Writer	28 episodes

== Awards and nominations ==
Year	Nominee / work	Award	Result
2006	Nickelodeon's O'Grady (Episode: "Old Cold")	Annie Award for Best Writing in an Animated Television Production	Nominated
2015	Disney XD's Wander Over Yonder (Episode: "The Gift 2: The Gifting"	Primetime Emmy Award for Outstanding Short-Form Animated Program	Nominated
