= Lynbrook, New York =

Village in New York, United States

- Village
- Incorporated Village of Lynbrook
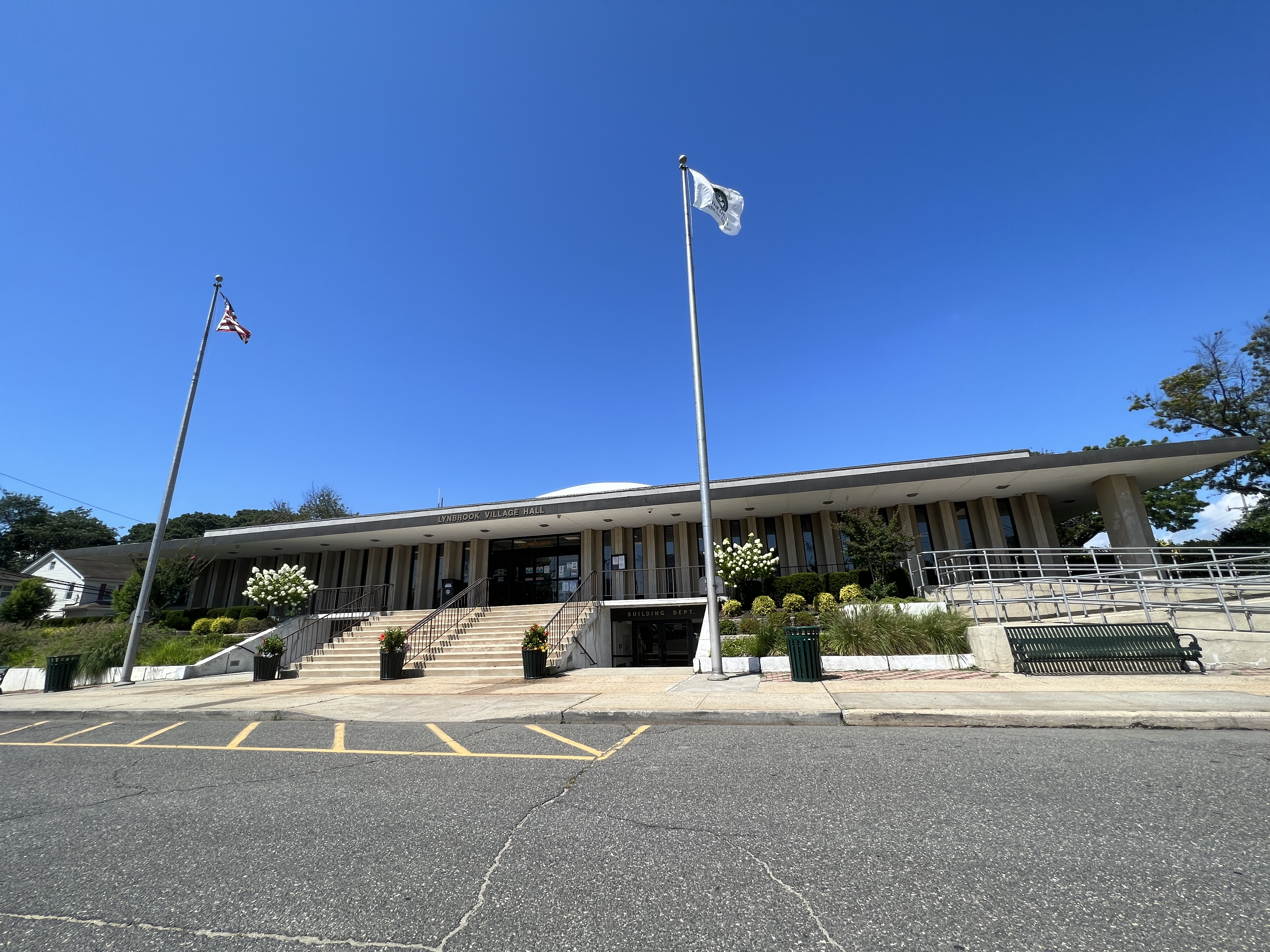
- Lynbrook Village Hall in 2022

- Official seal and letterhead
- Motto: “The Village That Leads the Way”
- Location in Nassau County and the state of New York

- Location on Long Island Location within the state of New York
- Coordinates: 40°39′30″N 73°40′22″W
- Country: United States
- State: New York
- County: Nassau
- Town: Hempstead
- Incorporated: 1911

Government
  - Mayor: Alan C. Beach
  - Deputy Mayor: Michael N. Hawxhurst

Area
  - Total: 2.01 sq mi (5.21 km^{2})
  - Land: 2.01 sq mi (5.21 km^{2})
  - Water: 0 sq mi (0.00 km^{2})
- Elevation: 20 ft (6 m)

Population (2020)
  - Total: 20,438
  - Density: 10,153.8/sq mi (3,920.42/km^{2})
- Time zone: UTC-5 (Eastern (EST))
  - Summer (DST): UTC-4 (EDT)
- ZIP codes: 11563-11564
- Area codes: 516, 363
- FIPS code: 36-43874
- GNIS feature ID: 2390951
- Website: lynbrookvillage.gov

Lynbrook is a village located within the Town of Hempstead in Nassau County, on the South Shore of Long Island, in New York, United States. The population was 20,438 at the time of the 2020 census.

== History ==
The area currently known as Lynbrook has had other names, including Rechquaakie (originally), Parson's Corners, and Bloomfield. It was later named Pearsall's Corners, after Mr. Pearsall's General Store, because this store became a famous stagecoach stop for travelers coming from New York City to Long Island. Alternatively, it was called "Five Corners" because the stagecoach stop was at the crossing of Hempstead Avenue, Merrick Road, and Broadway. It became known as Lynbrook in 1894 and the village was incorporated in 1911. The name "Lynbrook" is derived by dividing "Brooklyn" into its syllables and transposing them, a tribute to the original home of many of the town's turn-of-the-century residents.

Since 1912, Lynbrook has been served by the Lynbrook Police Department. The Chief of the Department is Brian Palladino. Since 1879, the Lynbrook Volunteer Fire Department has served Lynbrook. The department has six firehouses around Lynbrook. The Chief of the Department is Connor Ambrosio. Lynbrook is also served by its own Department of Public Works, which provides sanitation management. The superintendent is Phil Healey.

In 2008, three houses in Lynbrook were listed on the National Register of Historic Places: House at 251 Rocklyn Avenue, House at 474 Ocean Avenue, and House at 73 Grove Street. The Rockville Cemetery was listed in 2015. The Lynbrook Public Library was subsequently added to the NRHP in 2025.

== Geography ==
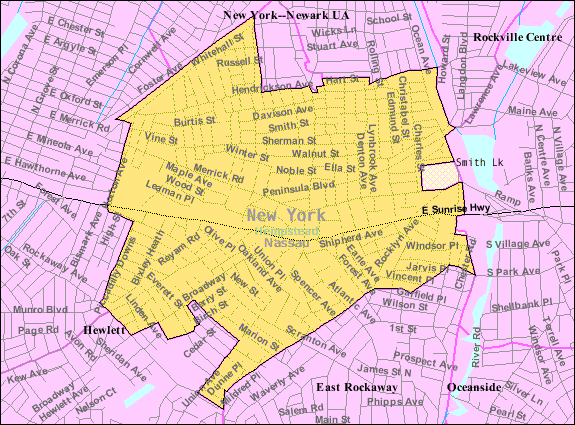
U.S. Census map of Lynbrook

According to the United States Census Bureau, the village has a total area of 2.0 square miles (5.2 km^{2}), all land.

Lynbrook neighbors Malverne to the north, Valley Stream to the west, Hewlett to the southwest, East Rockaway to the southeast, and Rockville Centre to the east.

== Demographics ==
Historical population
| Census | Pop. | Note | %± |
|---|---|---|---|
| 1920 | 4,371 | | — |
| 1930 | 11,993 | | 174.4% |
| 1940 | 14,557 | | 21.4% |
| 1950 | 17,314 | | 18.9% |
| 1960 | 19,881 | | 14.8% |
| 1970 | 23,151 | | 16.4% |
| 1980 | 20,424 | | −11.8% |
| 1990 | 19,208 | | −6.0% |
| 2000 | 19,911 | | 3.7% |
| 2010 | 19,427 | | −2.4% |
| 2020 | 20,438 | | 5.2% |
U.S. Decennial Census

=== Racial and ethnic composition ===
Lynbrook village, New York – Racial and ethnic composition Note: the US Census treats Hispanic/Latino as an ethnic category. This table excludes Latinos from the racial categories and assigns them to a separate category. Hispanics/Latinos may be of any race.
| Race / Ethnicity (NH = Non-Hispanic) | Pop 2000 | Pop 2010 | Pop 2020 | % 2000 | % 2010 | % 2020 |
|---|---|---|---|---|---|---|
| White alone (NH) | 17,285 | 15,090 | 13,210 | 86.81% | 77.68% | 64.63% |
| Black or African American alone (NH) | 174 | 648 | 1,345 | 0.87% | 3.34% | 6.58% |
| Native American or Alaska Native alone (NH) | 5 | 8 | 22 | 0.03% | 0.04% | 0.11% |
| Asian alone (NH) | 593 | 867 | 1,270 | 2.98% | 4.46% | 6.21% |
| Native Hawaiian or Pacific Islander alone (NH) | 0 | 0 | 1 | 0.00% | 0.00% | 0.00% |
| Other race alone (NH) | 38 | 61 | 154 | 0.19% | 0.31% | 0.75% |
| Mixed race or Multiracial (NH) | 168 | 219 | 589 | 0.84% | 1.13% | 2.88% |
| Hispanic or Latino (any race) | 1,648 | 2,534 | 3,847 | 8.28% | 13.04% | 18.82% |
| Total | 19,911 | 19,427 | 20,438 | 100.00% | 100.00% | 100.00% |

=== 2020 census ===
As of the 2020 census, Lynbrook had a population of 20,438. The median age was 42.5 years. 21.2% of residents were under the age of 18 and 19.2% of residents were 65 years of age or older. For every 100 females there were 90.3 males, and for every 100 females age 18 and over there were 87.1 males age 18 and over.

100.0% of residents lived in urban areas, while 0.0% lived in rural areas.

There were 7,459 households in Lynbrook, of which 32.6% had children under the age of 18 living in them. Of all households, 53.2% were married-couple households, 14.7% were households with a male householder and no spouse or partner present, and 27.2% were households with a female householder and no spouse or partner present. About 25.7% of all households were made up of individuals and 13.1% had someone living alone who was 65 years of age or older.

There were 7,798 housing units, of which 4.3% were vacant. The homeowner vacancy rate was 1.1% and the rental vacancy rate was 4.2%.

Racial composition as of the 2020 census
| Race | Number | Percent |
|---|---|---|
| White | 13,900 | 68.0% |
| Black or African American | 1,449 | 7.1% |
| American Indian and Alaska Native | 63 | 0.3% |
| Asian | 1,282 | 6.3% |
| Native Hawaiian and Other Pacific Islander | 2 | 0.0% |
| Some other race | 1,645 | 8.0% |
| Two or more races | 2,097 | 10.3% |
| Hispanic or Latino (of any race) | 3,847 | 18.8% |

=== 2010 census ===
As of the 2010 census the population of the village was 85.3% White, 77.7% Non-Hispanic White, 3.7% African American, 0.1% Native American, 4.5% Asian, 4.3% from other races, and 2.1% from two or more races. Hispanic or Latino of any race were 13% of the population.

=== 2000 census ===
As of the census of 2000, there were 19,911 people, 7,369 households, and 5,239 families residing in the village. The population density was 9,960.8 inhabitants per square mile (3,845.9/km^{2}). There were 7,570 housing units at an average density of 3,787.0 per square mile (1,462.2/km^{2}). The racial makeup of the village was 92.08% White, 0.92% African American, 0.06% Native American, 2.99% Asian, 2.51% from other races, and 1.44% from two or more races. Hispanic or Latino of any race were 8.28% of the population.

There were 7,369 households, out of which 30.5% had children under the age of 18 living with them, 58.4% were married couples living together, 9.9% had a female householder with no husband present, and 28.9% were non-families. 24.8% of all households were made up of individuals, and 11.9% had someone living alone who was 65 years of age or older. The average household size was 2.66 and the average family size was 3.20.

In the village, the population was spread out, with 22.5% under the age of 18, 6.1% from 18 to 24, 30.4% from 25 to 44, 23.4% from 45 to 64, and 17.7% who were 65 years of age or older. The median age was 40 years. For every 100 females, there were 89.7 males. For every 100 females age 18 and over, there were 86.0 males.

The median income for a household in the village was $68,373, and the median income for a family was $88,023. Males had a median income of $50,795 versus $36,545 for females. The per capita income for the village was $27,211. About 2.5% of families and 4.2% of the population were below the poverty line, including 3.6% of those under age 18 and 7.5% of those age 65 or over.

== Government ==
=== Village government ===
As of November 2025, the Mayor of Lynbrook is Alan C. Beach, the Deputy Mayor is Michael N. Hawxhurst, and the Village Trustees are Robert Boccio, Michael Habert, Michael N. Hawxhurst, and Ann Marie Reardon.

=== Representation in higher government ===
==== Town representation ====
Lynbrook is located in the Town of Hempstead's 4th Council District, which as of November 2025 is represented on the Hempstead Town Council by Laura A. Ryder (R–Lynbrook).

==== County representation ====
Lynbrook is located in Nassau County's 14th Legislative district, which as of November 2025 is represented in the Nassau County Legislature by C. William Gaylor III (R–Lynbrook).

==== New York State representation ====
===== New York State Assembly =====
Lynbrook is located in the New York's 21st State Assembly District, which as of November 2025 is represented in the New York State Assembly by Judy Griffin (D–Rockville Centre).

===== New York State Senate =====
Lynbrook is located in the New York State Senate's 9th State Senate district, which as of November 2025 is represented in the New York State Senate by Patricia Canzoneri-Fitzpatrick (R–Malverne)

==== Federal representation ====
===== United States Congress =====
Lynbrook is located in New York's 4th Congressional District, which as of November 2025 is represented in the United States Congress by Laura Gillen (D–Rockville Centre).

===== United States Senate =====
Like the rest of New York, Lynbrook is represented in the United States Senate by Charles Schumer (D) and Kirsten Gillibrand (D), as of November 2025.

== Education ==
=== Public education ===
School-aged children residing within the Village are eligible to attend one of the five public school districts that are within its boundaries: the East Rockaway Union Free School District, the Hewlett–Woodmere Union Free School District, the Malverne Union Free School District, the Lynbrook Union Free School District, and Valley Stream's school districts (including Valley Stream Central High School District), depending on where they reside within the village.

=== Private education ===
The village is also home to Our Lady of Peace Roman Catholic Elementary School.

== Transportation ==
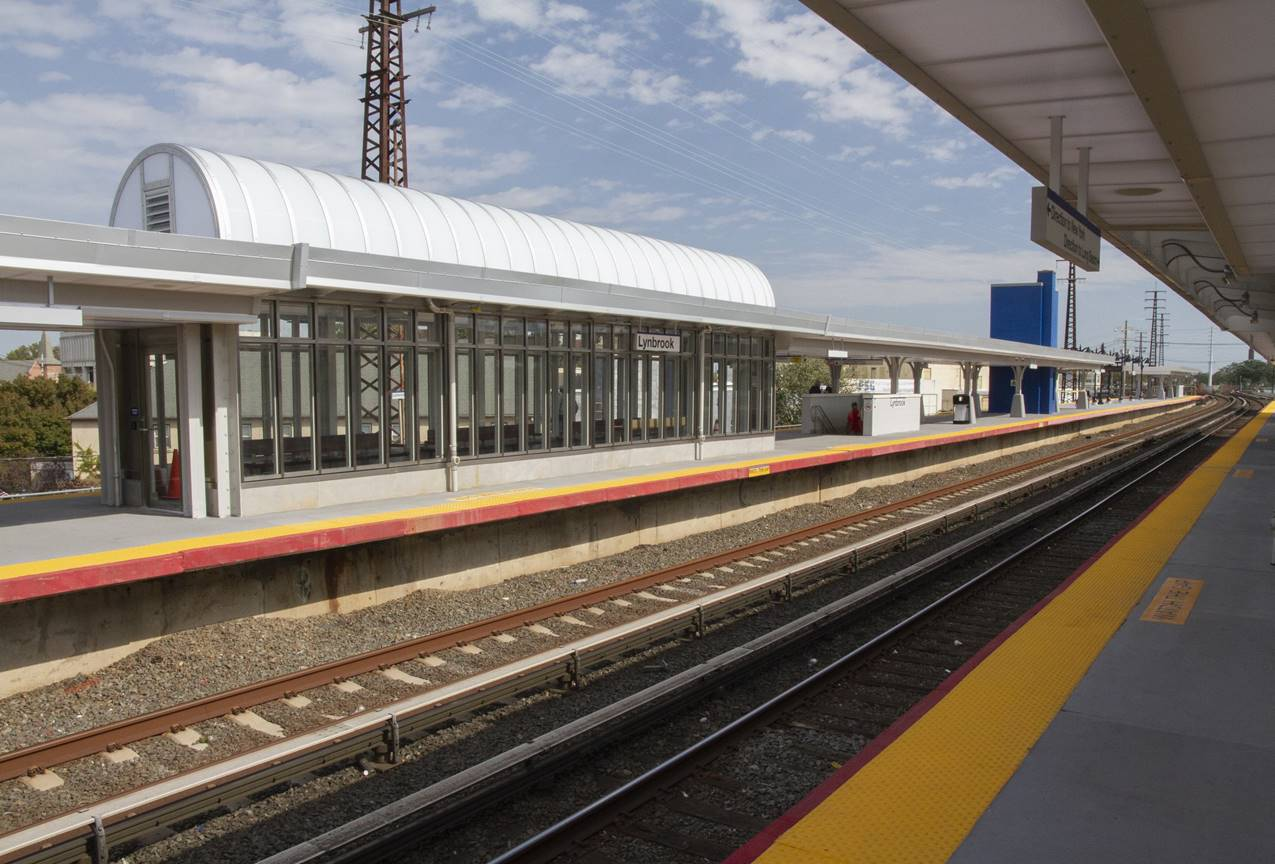
The Lynbrook LIRR station in 2020

Long Island Rail Road service to the New York City boroughs of Manhattan, Queens and Brooklyn is available at the Lynbrook station, located off Sunrise Highway between Peninsula Boulevard and Broadway in the heart of the village. There is also the Westwood station, located off Whitehall Street; the station straddles the Lynbrook–Malverne border.

Lynbrook is also served by the n4, n25, n31, and n32 bus routes. All four routes are operated by Nassau Inter-County Express (NICE) and travel through the village.

== In popular culture ==
=== Television appearances ===
- The sitcom Everybody Loves Raymond is set in Lynbrook. The fictional Marie and Frank Barone reside at 319 Fowler Avenue. Their son Raymond Barone and his family reside across the street at 320 Fowler Avenue, a real street in the center of town. The filming took place at Warner Bros. Burbank Studios in Burbank, California.
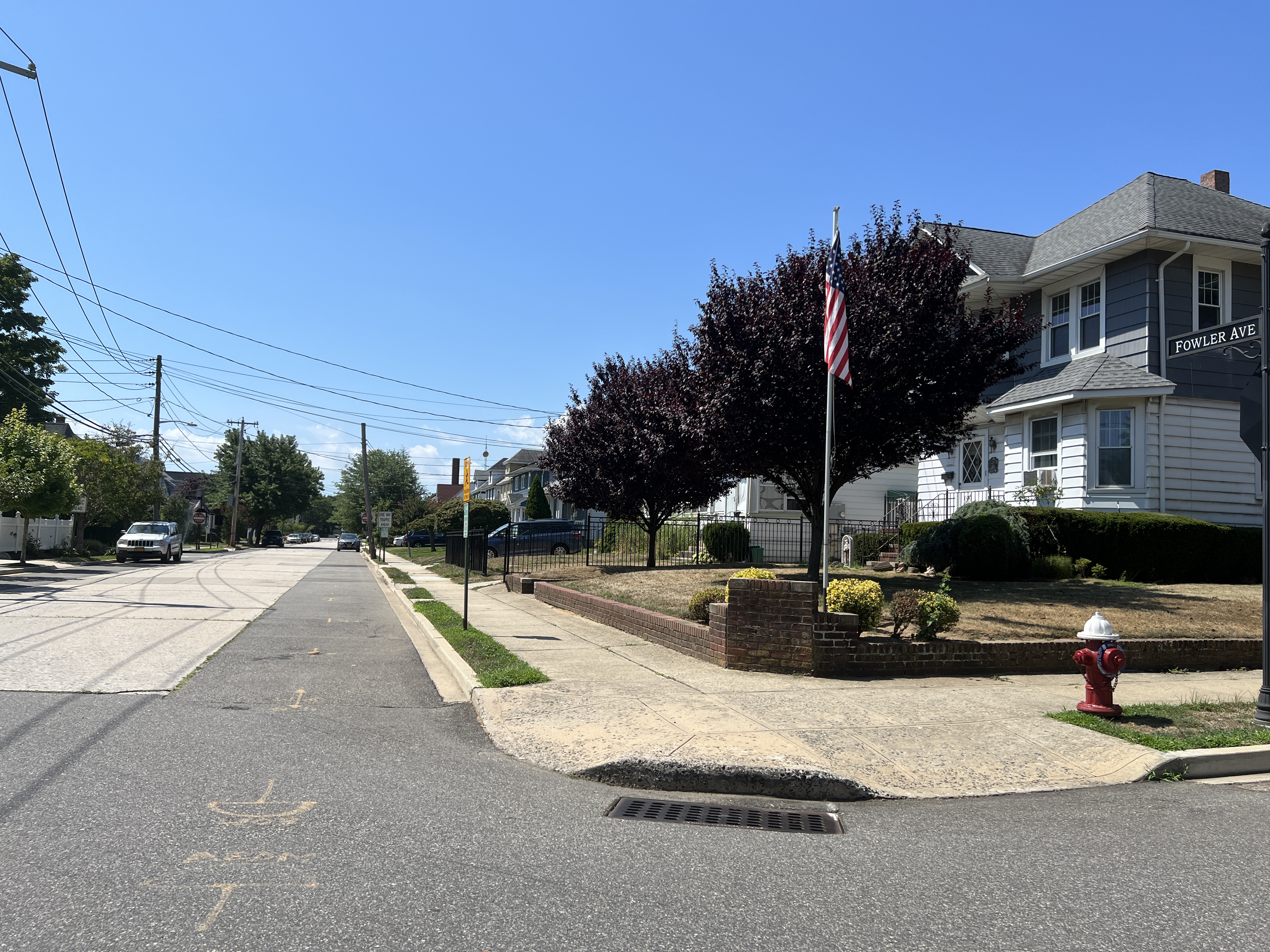
  Fowler Avenue in 2022
- In a Seinfeld episode, the gang mentions going to a mall in Lynbrook. There is no mall in Lynbrook, but Green Acres Mall is in nearby Valley Stream.
- Lynbrook's Trainland on Sunrise Highway was prominently featured in The Sopranos episode, "The Blue Comet" (aired June 3, 2007), with many scenes shot inside the store.

=== Movie ===
- Scenes from the motion picture After.Life, starring Christina Ricci, Liam Neeson and Justin Long, were filmed on Atlantic Avenue.

== Notable people ==
- Tex Antoine (1923–1983), early TV weatherman who would draw cartoons with the weather reports.
- Raymond J. Barry (born 1939), actor, was raised in Lynbrook and attended Lynbrook High School.
- Whittaker Chambers (1901–1961), Time magazine editor and former Communist-turned-anti-Communist activist, was raised in Lynbrook and lived there as an adult.
- Alan Colmes (1950–2017), radio and television personality, was raised in Lynbrook.
- Edward Field, poet, was raised in Lynbrook and attended Lynbrook High School.
- Joe Gatto, improv comedian, Impractical Jokers was a resident from Summer 2015 to 2019.
- Bob "Captain Kangaroo" Keeshan (1927–2004) was a television personality; he was born in Lynbrook.
- Quint Kessenich, sportscaster for ABC and ESPN television covering lacrosse, basketball, football, hockey, wrestling and horse racing since 1993.
- Tony Kornheiser, Pardon the Interruption television personality, was raised in Lynbrook.
- Charles Nam, sociologist.

== See also ==
- List of municipalities in New York
