= East Rockaway Union Free School District =

East rockaway school established in 1924 become known well by now

East Rockaway School District is a school district headquartered in East Rockaway, New York. The district was established in 1924. The district is the smallest in Nassau County. In 1992 it had 1,150 students.

At one time the East Rockaway School District proposed paying the Lynbrook Public Schools to have East Rockaway students in grades 7 through 12 attend public schools in Lynbrook; the Lynbrook district rejected the offer. In 1992 Robert Parry, the superintendent of the East Rockaway district, stated that it was still interested in consolidating with another district.

== Schools ==
- East Rockaway High School
- Centre Avenue Elementary School
- Rhame Avenue Elementary School

== Controversy ==
In 2014 a teacher at Rhame Avenue school accused the district of removing her from teaching duties due to her students making higher test scores than expected.
