= East Rockaway, New York =

- Village
- Incorporated Village of East Rockaway
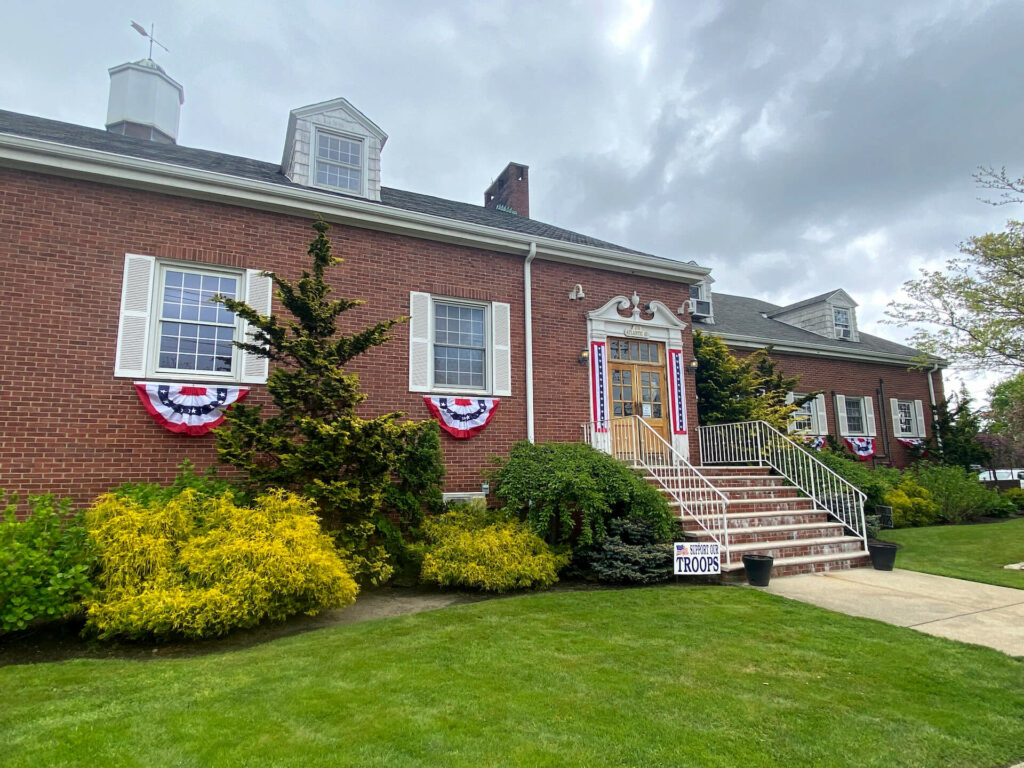
- East Rockaway Village Hall in 2026

- Seal

- Location in Nassau County and the state of New York

- Location on Long Island Location within the state of New York
- Coordinates: 40°38′37″N 73°40′1″W
- Country: United States
- State: New York
- County: Nassau
- Town: Hempstead
- Incorporated: 1900

Government
  - Mayor: Gordon J. Fox

Area
  - Total: 1.03 sq mi (2.67 km^{2})
  - Land: 1.02 sq mi (2.64 km^{2})
  - Water: 0.012 sq mi (0.03 km^{2})
- Elevation: 9.8 ft (3 m)

Population (2020)
  - Total: 10,159
  - Density: 9,979.1/sq mi (3,852.97/km^{2})
- Time zone: UTC-5 (EST)
  - Summer (DST): UTC-4 (EDT)
- ZIP Codes: 11518 (East Rockaway); 11557 (Hewlett); 11563 (Lynbrook)
- Area code(s): 516, 363
- FIPS code: 36-22876
- GNIS feature ID: 0949233
- Website: villageofeastrockaway.org

East Rockaway is a village located within Nassau County, on the South Shore of Long Island, in New York, United States. The population was 10,159 at the time of the 2020 census.

The Village of East Rockaway is located on the eastern edge of Rockaway Peninsula in the town of Hempstead, adjacent to Hewlett Harbor, Hewlett, Rockville Centre, Lynbrook, and Oceanside. It is the final neighborhood before the beginning of Five Towns to the west – although some have come to include wealthier sections of East Rockaway as a part of Five Towns.

The village is an inner suburb, only 24 km (15 mi) from downtown Manhattan. The primary ethnicities are Italian and Irish. The Waverly Park neighborhood, near the Hewlett-East Rockaway Jewish Center and along the border with Hewlett, has a sizable Jewish community.

== History ==
Originally named Near Rockaway, the village began as a shipping and trading center for the South Shore of Long Island. The village's location was desirable for ships because of its deep channels inland. Eventually a grist mill was built on the Mill River by Joseph Haviland through a land grant in 1688. The Haviland-Davison Grist Mill, located in Memorial Park, was listed on the National Register of Historic Places in 1998. Later, an oven was purchased to make bread for the surrounding population. The village prospered in shipping and milling over the years, even after several sales of the land.

The village's name was changed in 1869 to East Rockaway.

The village was incorporated in 1900, and Floyd Johnson was its Village President.

At the time of incorporation the village had a population of 969.

== Geography ==
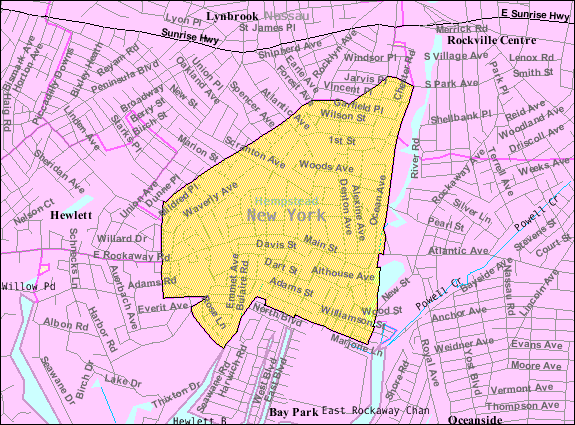
U.S. Census map of East Rockaway

According to the United States Census Bureau, the village has a total area of 1.03 square miles (2.7 km^{2}), of which 1.02 square miles (2.6 km^{2}) is land and 0.01 square miles (0.026 km^{2}) is water.

=== Climate ===
Under the Köppen climate classification, East Rockaway features a humid subtropical climate (Cfa), bordering on a hot-summer humid continental climate (Dfa). Accordingly, summers are usually hot and humid with occasional thunderstorms, winters are usually cool with snow and rain, and the spring and fall typically feature mild weather.

== Demographics ==
Historical population
| Census | Pop. | Note | %± |
|---|---|---|---|
| 1880 | 509 | | — |
| 1900 | 739 | | — |
| 1910 | 1,200 | | 62.4% |
| 1920 | 2,005 | | 67.1% |
| 1930 | 4,340 | | 116.5% |
| 1940 | 5,610 | | 29.3% |
| 1950 | 7,970 | | 42.1% |
| 1960 | 10,721 | | 34.5% |
| 1970 | 11,795 | | 10.0% |
| 1980 | 10,917 | | −7.4% |
| 1990 | 10,152 | | −7.0% |
| 2000 | 10,414 | | 2.6% |
| 2010 | 9,818 | | −5.7% |
| 2020 | 10,159 | | 3.5% |
U.S. Decennial Census

=== Racial and ethnic composition ===
East Rockaway village, New York – Racial and ethnic composition Note: the US Census treats Hispanic/Latino as an ethnic category. This table excludes Latinos from the racial categories and assigns them to a separate category. Hispanics/Latinos may be of any race.
| Race / Ethnicity (NH = Non-Hispanic) | Pop 2000 | Pop 2010 | Pop 2020 | % 2000 | % 2010 | % 2020 |
|---|---|---|---|---|---|---|
| White alone (NH) | 9,518 | 8,617 | 7,789 | 91.40% | 87.77% | 76.67% |
| Black or African American alone (NH) | 56 | 127 | 296 | 0.54% | 1.29% | 2.91% |
| Native American or Alaska Native alone (NH) | 1 | 4 | 4 | 0.01% | 0.04% | 0.04% |
| Asian alone (NH) | 177 | 200 | 327 | 1.70% | 2.04% | 3.22% |
| Native Hawaiian or Pacific Islander alone (NH) | 1 | 1 | 0 | 0.01% | 0.01% | 0.00% |
| Other race alone (NH) | 6 | 17 | 43 | 0.06% | 0.17% | 0.42% |
| Mixed race or Multiracial (NH) | 52 | 64 | 249 | 0.50% | 0.65% | 2.45% |
| Hispanic or Latino (any race) | 603 | 788 | 1,451 | 5.79% | 8.03% | 14.28% |
| Total | 10,414 | 9,818 | 10,159 | 100.00% | 100.00% | 100.00% |

=== 2020 census ===
As of the 2020 census, East Rockaway had a population of 10,159. The median age was 44.3 years. 19.7% of residents were under the age of 18 and 20.1% of residents were 65 years of age or older. For every 100 females, there were 91.1 males, and for every 100 females age 18 and over, there were 89.1 males age 18 and over.

100.0% of residents lived in urban areas, while 0.0% lived in rural areas.

There were 3,814 households in East Rockaway, of which 29.0% had children under the age of 18 living in them. Of all households, 54.0% were married-couple households, 15.2% were households with a male householder and no spouse or partner present, and 26.7% were households with a female householder and no spouse or partner present. About 27.6% of all households were made up of individuals and 13.1% had someone living alone who was 65 years of age or older.

There were 4,000 housing units, of which 4.7% were vacant. The homeowner vacancy rate was 1.0% and the rental vacancy rate was 5.2%.

=== 2000 census ===
As of the census of 2000, there were 10,414 people, 3,926 households, and 2,787 families residing in the village. The population density was 10,187.6 inhabitants per square mile (3,933.5/km^{2}). There were 4,003 housing units at an average density of 3,916.0 per square mile (1,512.0/km^{2}). The racial makeup of the village was 95.64% White, 0.61% African American, 0.03% Native American, 1.71% Asian, 0.01% Pacific Islander, 1.09% from other races, and 0.91% from two or more races. Hispanic or Latino of any race were 5.79% of the population.

There were 3,926 households, out of which 32.6% had children under the age of 18 living with them, 59.4% were married couples living together, 8.8% had a female householder with no husband present, and 29.0% were non-families. 25.9% of all households were made up of individuals, and 11.2% had someone living alone who was 65 years of age or older. The average household size was 2.62 and the average family size was 3.20.

In the village, the population was spread out, with 23.7% under the age of 18, 6.1% from 18 to 24, 30.6% from 25 to 44, 24.1% from 45 to 64, and 15.4% who were 65 years of age or older. The median age was 39 years. For every 100 females, there were 90.3 males. For every 100 females age 18 and over, there were 87.4 males.

The median income for a household in the village was $59,911, and the median income for a family was $78,363. Males had a median income of $50,365 versus $36,387 for females. The per capita income for the village was $30,601. About 2.4% of families and 3.5% of the population were below the poverty line, including 3.6% of those under age 18 and 6.0% of those age 65 or older.

== Education ==
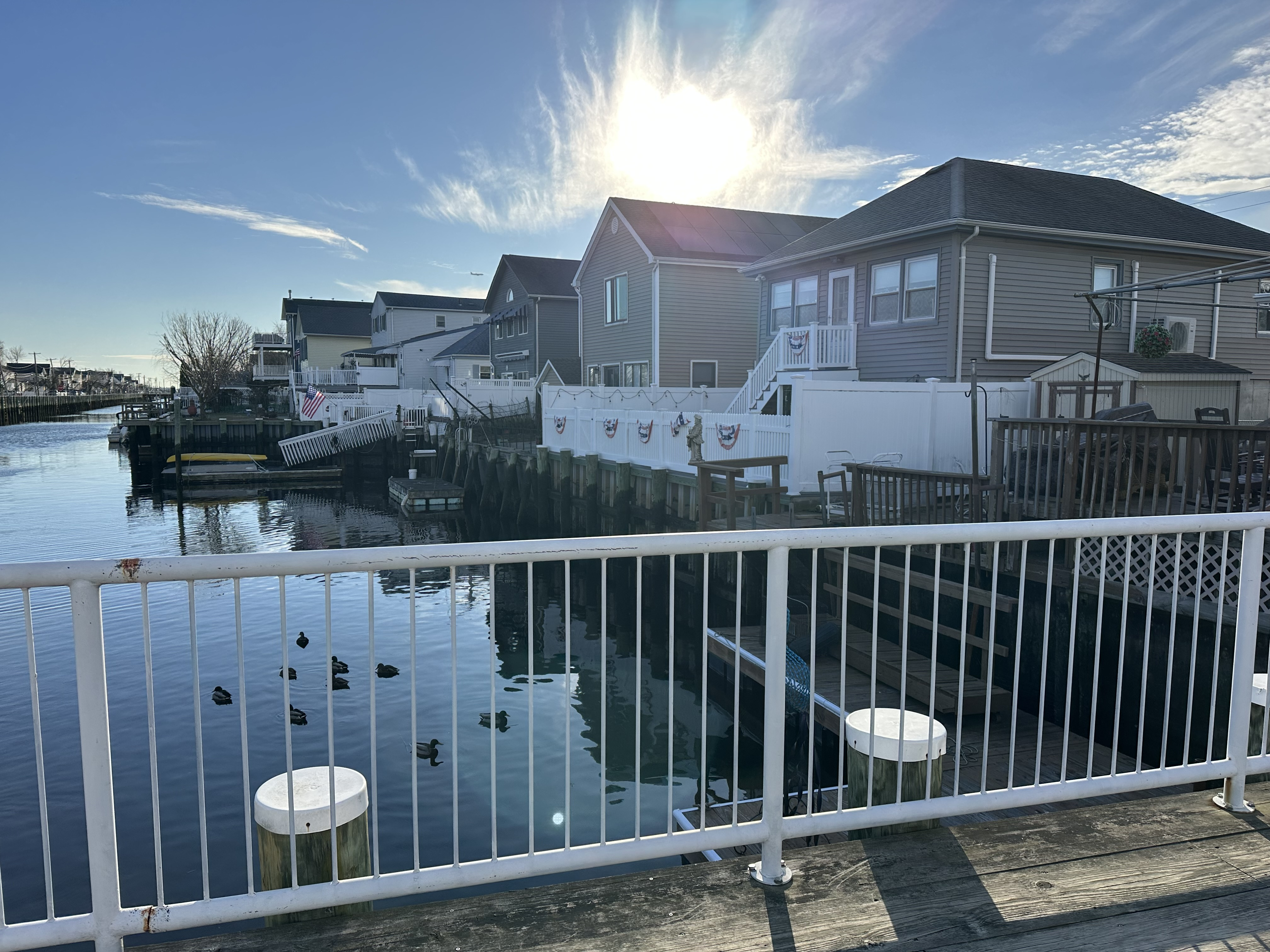
The docks in East Rockaway in 2026

As of June 2022, there are two school districts serving East Rockaway: the East Rockaway School District and the Lynbrook Union Free School District:

There are three schools within the East Rockaway School District:

- Rhame Avenue Elementary School
- Centre Avenue (Elementary) School
- East Rockaway High School - Serves grades 7-12

Each grade of the high school consists of roughly 100 students. The nickname of the athletic teams is "The Rocks." All high school varsity, jr. varsity and freshman team colors are a distinctive Orange and Black. East Rockaway High School fields competitive teams in football, cross country, volleyball, basketball, softball, baseball, and track. Along with these teams East Rockaway also combines with schools in the Malverne school district to form teams. These include soccer, lacrosse and tennis. School musicals and the inter-class competition known as "Rock Rivalry" are widely popular throughout the community.

Located in East Rockaway on Atlantic Avenue is St. Raymonds Catholic school, consisting of Pre-K through 8th grade. See Roman Catholic Diocese of Rockville Centre

The Waverly Park and Northwestern neighborhoods of East Rockaway (the border approximately running down Rocklyn, Carman, and Grant Avenues) are part of Lynbrook School District 20 in the Lynbrook Union Free School District, and are serviced by four main schools:

- Waverly Park Elementary School (in East Rockaway)
- Marion Street Elementary School (in East Rockaway)
- South Middle School (in Hewlett)
- Lynbrook Senior High School (in Lynbrook)

== Parks and recreation ==
- John Street Complex — This recreational complex has one baseball diamond, two basketball courts, and a concession stand. Flag Football, Baseball, and Basketball are played at this complex.

== Infrastructure ==
=== Transportation ===
East Rockaway contains two Long Island Rail Road stations, both of which serve the Long Beach Branch. The main station between Ocean Avenue and Atlantic Avenue, and the Centre Avenue station northwest of there. Until 1951, there was also a third station at Atlantic Avenue.

=== Emergency services ===
The village is primarily covered by the 4th Precinct of the Nassau County Police Department.

Fire and ambulance services are provided by the all volunteer East Rockaway Fire Department.

== Notable people ==
- Gary Giddins (1948- ), writer, Bing Crosby: A Pocketful of Dreams
- Reid Gorecki (1980-), Major League Baseball player
- Brian Keith (1921–1997), actor Family Affair
- Don Murray (1929-2024), actor Bus Stop
- Bruce Sussman (1949-), Songwriter

== See also ==
- List of municipalities in New York
- Far Rockaway
