= House at 474 Ocean Avenue =

Historic house in New York, United States

- U.S. National Register of Historic Places
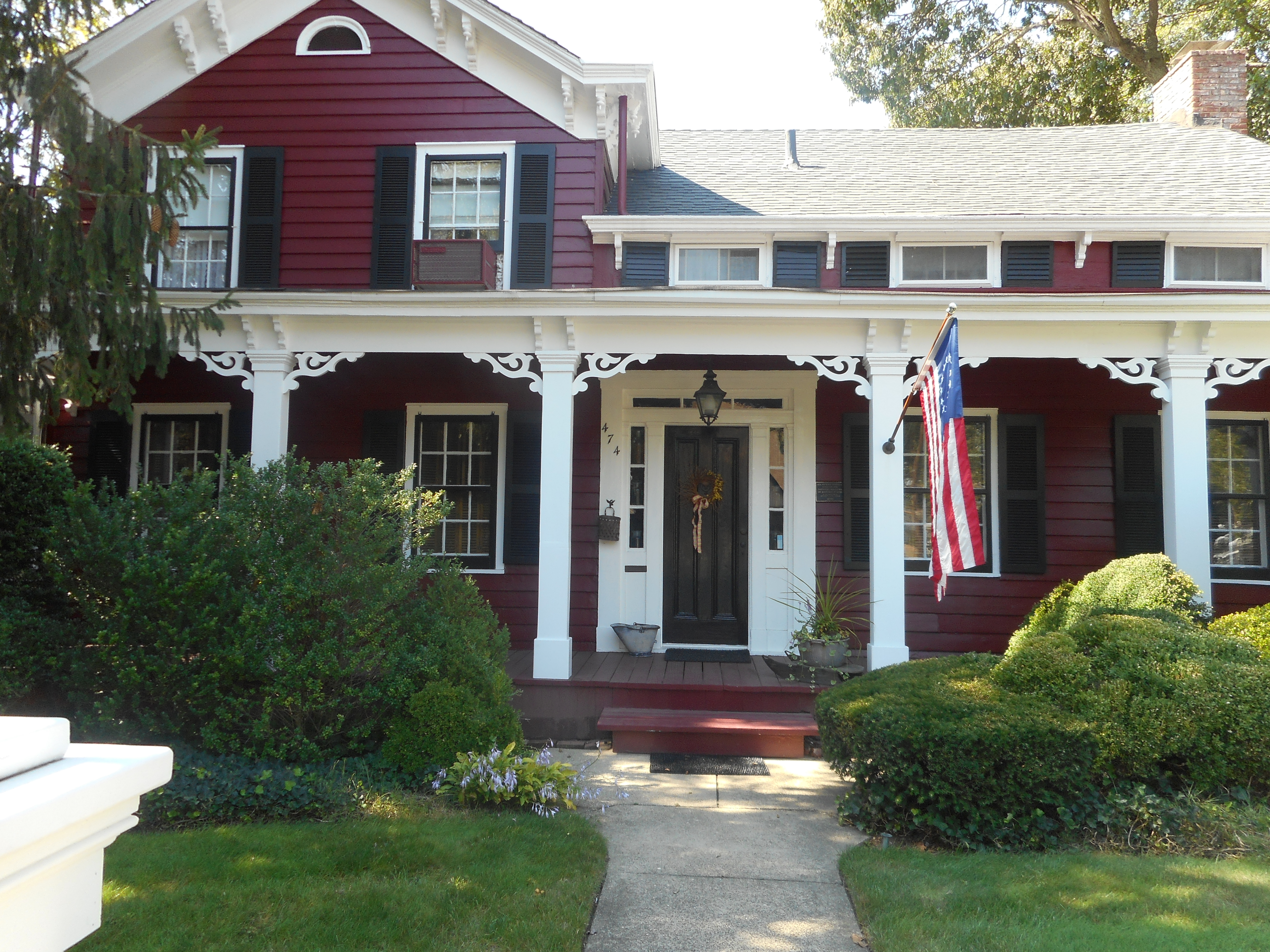
- Close-up view of the house

- Location within New York Location within the United States
- Location: 474 Ocean Ave., Lynbrook, New York
- Coordinates: 40°39′14.9″N 73°39′29.5″W
- Area: less than one acre
- Built: 1838
- Architectural style: Greek Revival
- NRHP reference No.: 07001455
- Added to NRHP: September 15, 2008

House at 474 Ocean Avenue, also known as Luning House, is a historic home located at Lynbrook in Nassau County, New York. It was built about 1838 and is a two-story, frame Greek Revival style dwelling. It consists of a large three-bay center section with a two-story, two-bay wing. A single height porch runs the length of the house and has square support posts with distinctive scroll brackets. Also on the property is a contributing well house.

It was listed on the National Register of Historic Places in 2008.
