= Haviland-Davison Grist Mill =

- U.S. National Register of Historic Places
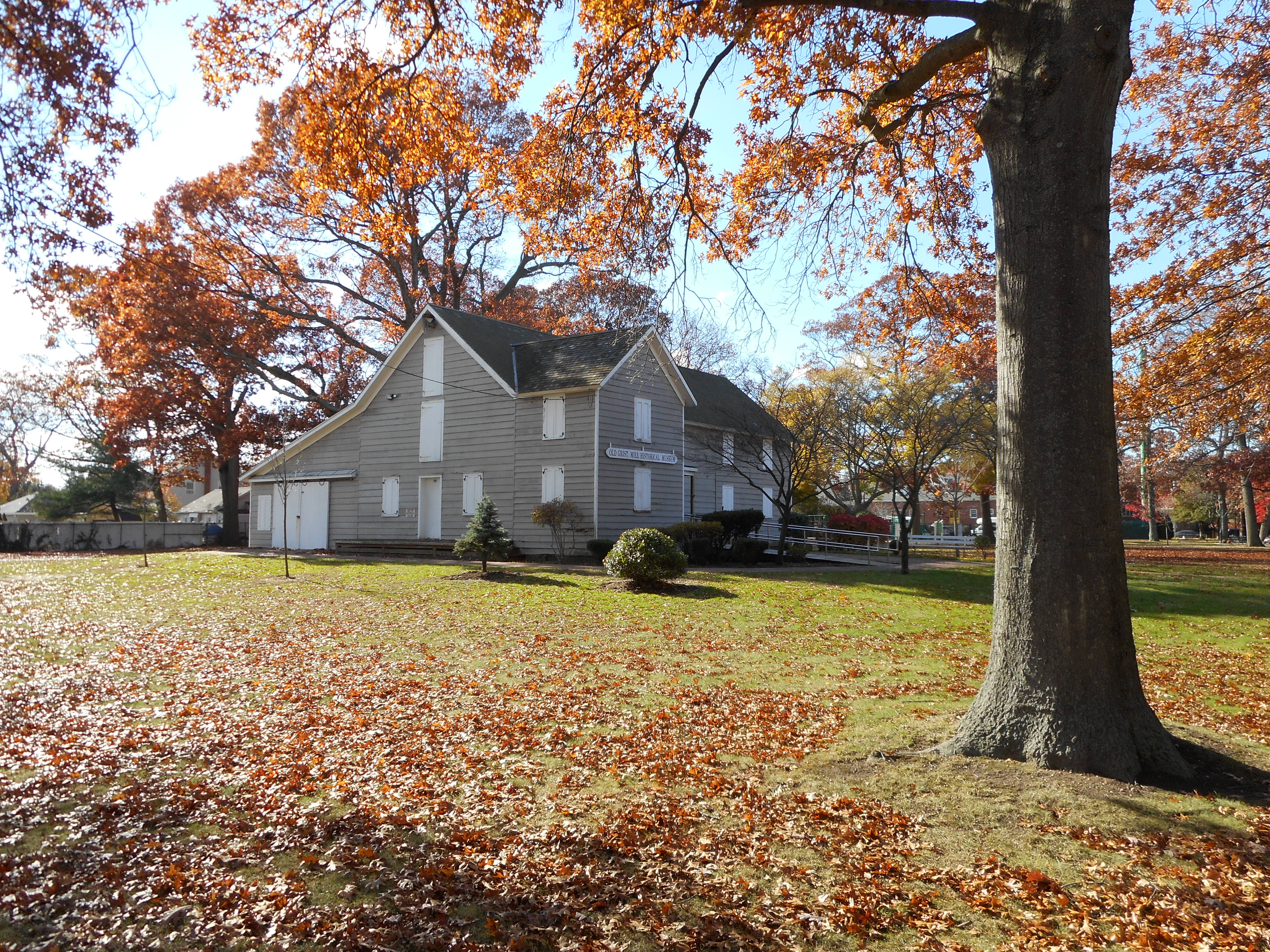
- The mill as seen from the corner of Woods and Denton Avenues

- Location within New York Location within the United States
- Location: Jct. of Woods and Denton Aves., East Rockaway, New York
- Coordinates: 40°38′47″N 73°39′49″W
- Area: less than one acre
- Built: ca. 1689
- Architectural style: Colonial
- NRHP reference No.: 98000352
- Added to NRHP: April 21, 1998

Haviland-Davison Grist Mill is a historic grist mill located at East Rockaway in Nassau County, New York. It was restored and relocated to its present site in Memorial Park in 1963. It was built about 1689 and is a 2 1/2-story, T-shaped, timber-frame building. The original section has one large addition and two smaller wings attached to each side.

It was listed on the National Register of Historic Places in 1998.

The mill is now known as the East Rockaway Grist Mill Museum and features artifacts and displays of local history.

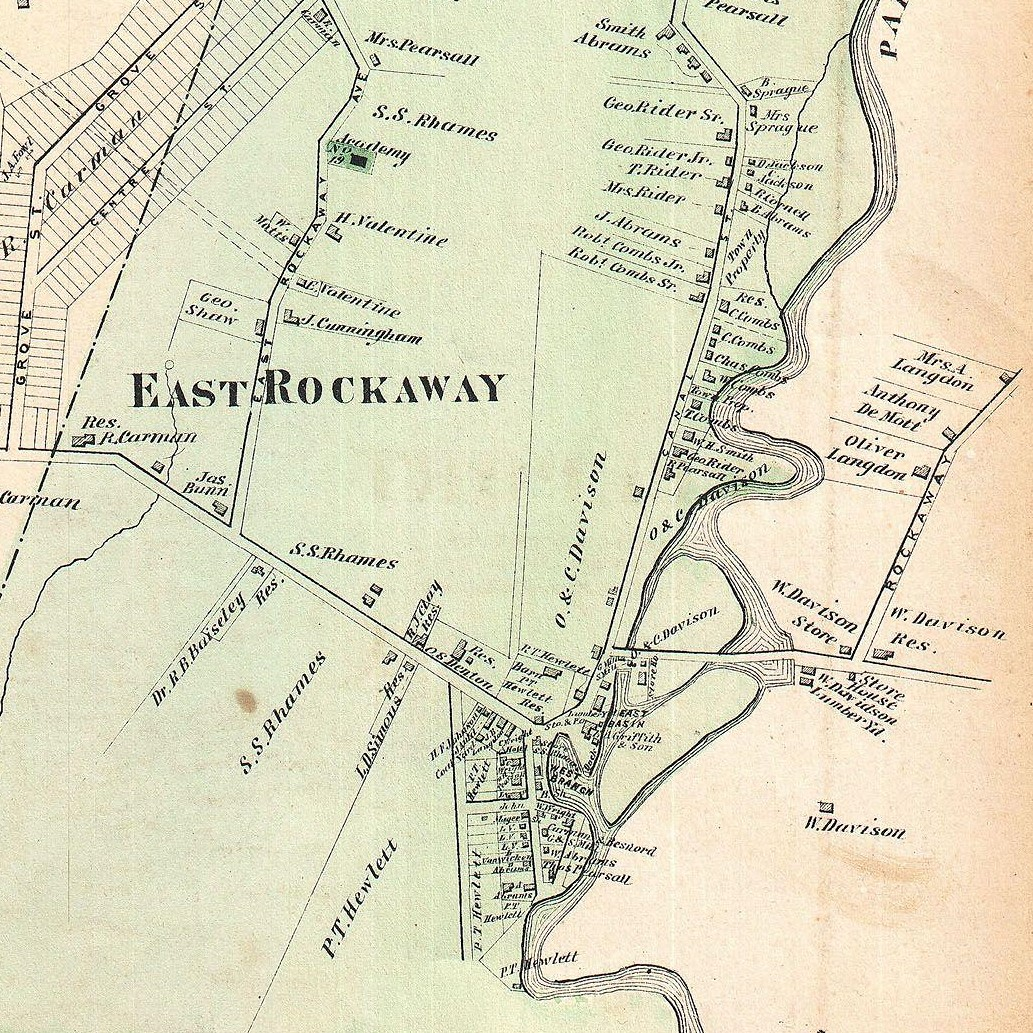
1873 Beers Map of Pearsalls, Long Island, New York - Geographicus - HempsteadRockville-beers-1873
