= House at 73 Grove Street =

Historic house in New York, United States

- U.S. National Register of Historic Places
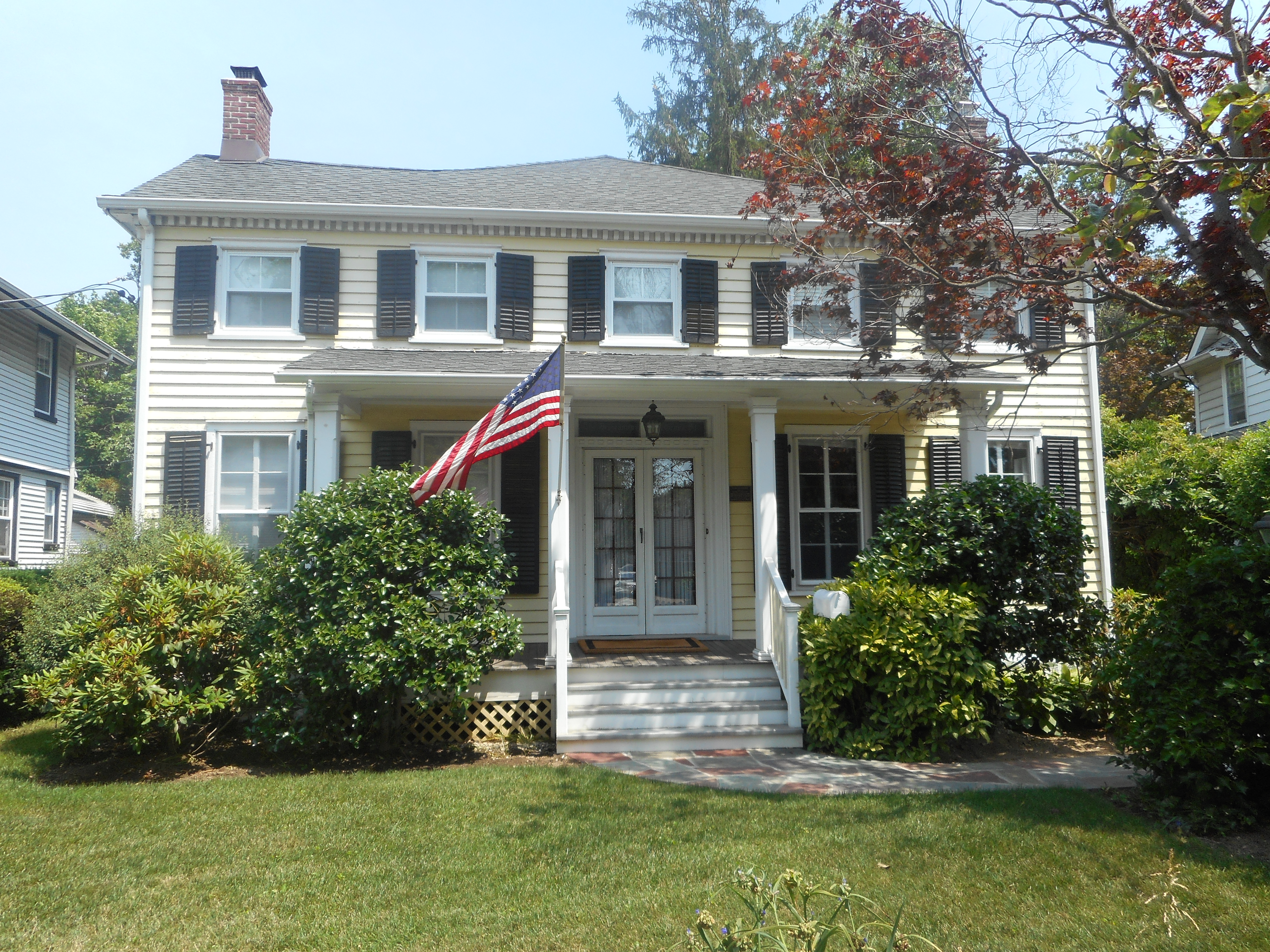
- Front yard of the house

- Location within New York Location within the United States
- Location: 73 Grove St., Lynbrook, New York
- Coordinates: 40°39′54″N 73°40′2″W
- Area: less than one acre
- Built: 1840
- Architectural style: Colonial Revival
- NRHP reference No.: 07001453
- Added to NRHP: January 23, 2008

House at 73 Grove Street is a historic home located at Lynbrook in Nassau County, New York. It was built about 1840 and is a 2 1/2-story, clapboard-sided dwelling with a side-gabled roof. It was originally one room deep and two rooms wide, but expanded to two rooms deep in the 1930s. It has a two-story rear extension. It features a three-bay, single-story Colonial Revival style porch with four square support posts.

It was listed on the National Register of Historic Places in 2008.
