= House at 251 Rocklyn Avenue =

Historic house in New York, United States

- U.S. National Register of Historic Places
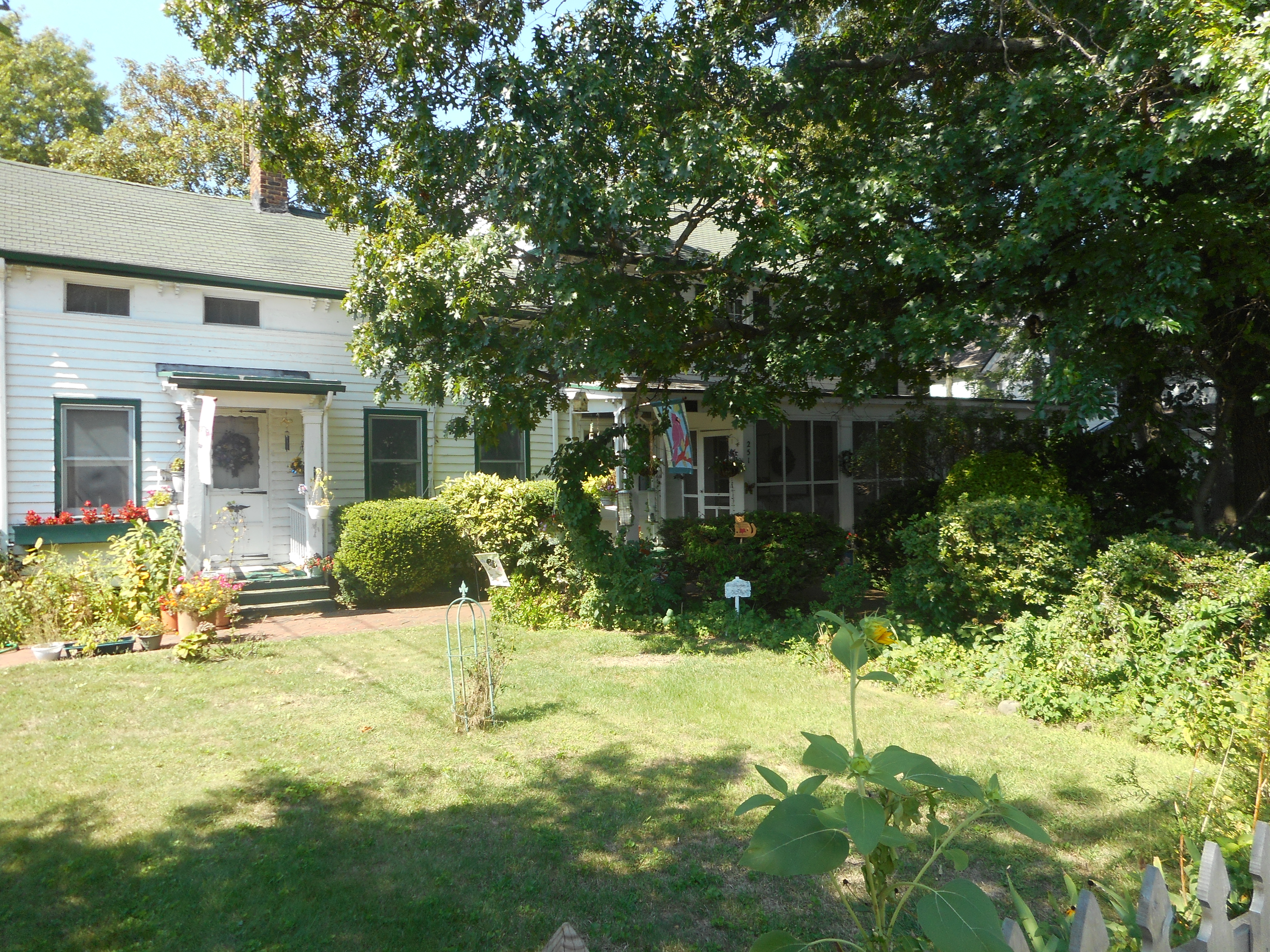
- The house as seen from the corner of Rocklyn and Earle Avenues

- Location within New York Location within the United States
- Location: 251 Rocklyn Ave., Lynbrook, New York
- Coordinates: 40°39′6.54″N 73°39′54.33″W
- Area: less than one acre
- Built: ca. 1793
- Architectural style: Greek Revival, Colonial Revival
- NRHP reference No.: 07001454
- Added to NRHP: September 15, 2008

House at 251 Rocklyn Avenue is a historic home located at Lynbrook in Nassau County, New York. It is an L-shaped dwelling with 2-story central section, a 2-story addition to the east, and 1 1/2-story addition to the west with a 1-story rear addition and cross gable roof. The oldest section, the west section, was built about 1793. A single-story, partially enclosed porch extends across the center section.

It was listed on the National Register of Historic Places in 2008.
