= Nassau County Courthouse (New York) =

- U.S. National Register of Historic Places
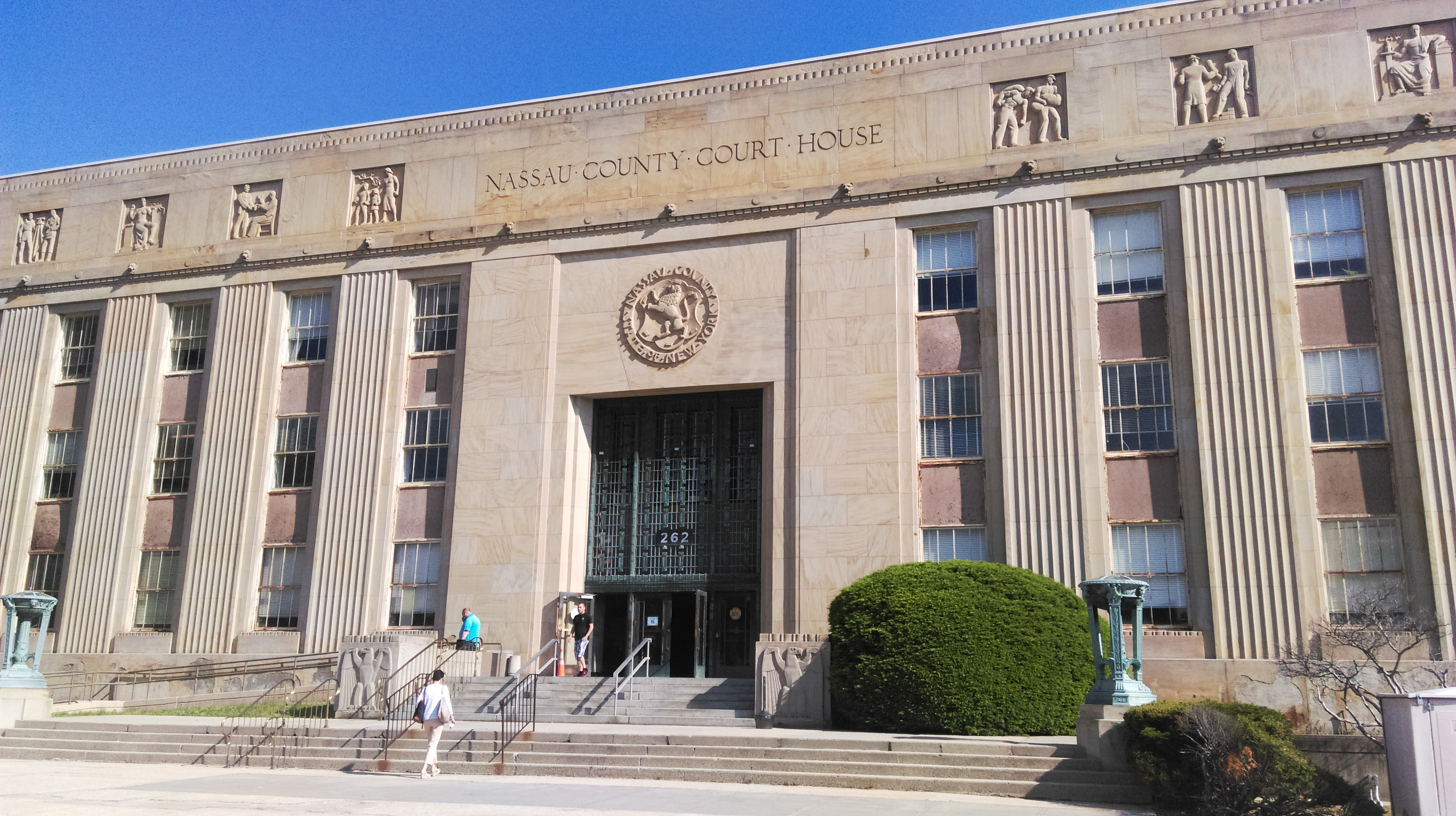
- The front of the Nassau County Courthouse in 2015

- Location within New York Location within the United States
- Interactive map showing the location of Nassau County Courthouse
- Location: 262 Old Country Road, Garden City, New York
- Coordinates: 40°44′20″N 73°38′4″W
- Built: 1938-1940
- Architectural style: Classical
- NRHP reference No.: 100006213
- Added to NRHP: March 2, 2021

The Nassau County Courthouse is the courthouse for Nassau County on Long Island in New York, United States. It is located at 262 Old Country Road in the Village of Garden City, although it uses the Mineola, New York 11501 ZIP Code and post office.

== History ==
The Nassau County Courthouse was built in 1940, after the older Nassau County Courthouse was determined to be too small for the needs of a rapidly-growing Nassau County. The building was constructed as part of a Public Works Administration project, along with the other two structures built at the complex as part of the project.

The County of Nassau hired architect and county resident Lawrence Lincoln in 1938 to design the new complex.

The building was added to the National Register of Historic Places in March 2021.

== See also ==
- National Register of Historic Places listings in Hempstead (town), New York
