= List of villages on Long Island =

A list of villages on Long Island, USA

== A ==
- Amityville (Suffolk County)
- Asharoken (Suffolk County)
- Atlantic Beach (Nassau County)

== B ==
- Babylon (Suffolk County)
- Baxter Estates (Nassau County)
- Bayville (Nassau County)
- Bellerose (Nassau County)
- Belle Terre (Suffolk County)
- Bellport (Suffolk County)
- Bethpage (Nassau County)
- Brightwaters (Suffolk County)
- Brookville (Nassau County)
- Brentwood (Suffolk County)

== C ==
- Cedarhurst (Nassau County)
- Centre Island (Nassau County)
- Copiague (Suffolk County)
- Cove Neck (Nassau County)
- Centereach (Suffolk County)

== D ==
- Dering Harbor (Suffolk County)
- Deer Park (Suffolk County)

== E ==
- East Hampton (Suffolk County)
- East Hills (Nassau County)
- East Rockaway (Nassau County)
- East Williston (Nassau County)

== F ==
- Farmingdale (Nassau County)
- Floral Park (Nassau County)
- Flower Hill (Nassau County)
- Freeport (Nassau County)
- Franklin Square (Nassau County)

== G ==
- Garden City (Nassau County)
- Great Neck (Nassau County)
- Great Neck Estates (Nassau County)
- Great Neck Plaza (Nassau County)
- Greenlawn (Suffolk County)
- Greenport (Suffolk County)
- Greenvale (Nassau County)

== H ==
- Head of the Harbor (Suffolk County)
- Hempstead (Nassau County)
- Hewlett Bay Park (Nassau County)
- Hewlett Harbor (Nassau County)
- Hewlett Neck (Nassau County)
- Hicksville (Nassau County)
- Huntington Bay (Suffolk County)
- Hauppauge (Suffolk County)

== I ==
- Islandia (Suffolk County)
- Island Park (Nassau County)

== K ==
- Kensington (Nassau County)
- Kings Park (Suffolk County)
- Kings Point (Nassau County)
- Kismet (Suffolk County)

== L ==
- Lake Grove (Suffolk County)
- Lake Success (Nassau County)
- Lattingtown (Nassau County)
- Laurel Hollow (Nassau County)
- Lawrence (Nassau County)
- Lindenhurst (Suffolk County)
- Lloyd Harbor (Suffolk County)
- Long Beach (Nassau County)
- Lynbrook (Nassau County)

== M ==
- Malverne (Nassau County)
- Manorhaven (Nassau County)
- Massapequa (Nassau County)
- Mastic Beach (Suffolk County)
- Matinecock (Nassau County)
- Mill Neck (Nassau County)
- Mineola (Nassau County)
- Munsey Park (Nassau County)
- Muttontown (Nassau County)
- Miller Place (Suffolk County)
- Mount Sinai (Suffolk County)
- Melville (Suffolk County)

== N ==
- New Hyde Park (Nassau County)
- Nissequogue (Suffolk County)
- North Haven (Suffolk County)
- North Hills (Nassau County)
- Northport (Suffolk County)

North Bellmore New York (Nassa County

== O ==
- Ocean Beach (Suffolk County)
- Old Brookville (Nassau County)
- Old Field (Suffolk County)
- Old Westbury (Nassau County)
- Oyster Bay Cove (Nassau County)

== P ==
- Patchogue (Suffolk County)
- Plandome (Nassau County)
- Plandome Heights (Nassau County)
- Plandome Manor (Nassau County)
- Plainview (Nassau County)
- Poquott (Suffolk County)
- Port Jefferson (Suffolk County)
- Port Washington North (Nassau County)

== Q ==
- Quogue (Suffolk County)

== R ==
- Rockville Centre (Nassau County)
- Roslyn (Nassau County)
- Roslyn Estates (Nassau County)
- Roslyn Harbor (Nassau County)
- Russell Gardens (Nassau County)
- Riverhead (Suffolk County)
- Roosevelt (Nassau County)

== S ==
- Saddle Rock (Nassau County)
- Sag Harbor (Suffolk County)
- Sagaponack (Suffolk County)
- Saltaire (Suffolk County)
- Sands Point (Nassau County)
- Sea Cliff (Nassau County)
- Shoreham (Suffolk County)
- South Floral Park (Nassau County)
- Southampton (Suffolk County)
- Stewart Manor (Nassau County)
- Syosset (Nassau County)
- Sound Beach (Suffolk County)

== T ==
- Thomaston (Nassau County)

== U ==
- Upper Brookville (Nassau County)
- Uniondale (Nassau County)

== V ==
- Valley Stream (Nassau County)
- Village of the Branch (Suffolk County)

== W ==
- West Hampton Dunes (Suffolk County)
- Westbury (Nassau County)
- Westhampton Beach (Suffolk County)
- Williston Park (Nassau County)
- Woodsburgh (Nassau County)
- Wyandanch (Suffolk County)

== Y ==
- Yaphank (Suffolk County)
