= Woodmere Boulevard =

- Woodmere Boulevard (county-owned section in red; town-owned section in blue)

Route information
- Maintained by NCDPW and ToH DPW
- Length: 2.09 mi (3.36 km)

Major junctions
- South end: Hickory Road at the Hewlett Neck–Woodsburgh line
- Broadway (CR C22) at the Woodsburgh–Woodmere line West Broadway (CR E51) in Woodmere; Peninsula Boulevard (CR 2) in Woodmere
- North end: Rica Lane in Woodmere

Location
- Country: United States
- State: New York
- County: Nassau

Highway system
- County routes in New York; County Routes in Nassau County

Woodmere Boulevard is a 2.09-mile (3.36 km) thoroughfare between the Villages of Hewlett Neck and Woodsburgh and the unincorporated hamlet of Woodmere, in the Five Towns area of Nassau County, New York, United States.

All portions of the road south of Peninsula Boulevard (CR 2) are owned by Nassau County and maintained by the Nassau County Department of Public Works as the unsigned Nassau County Route E68. The remaining 0.5-mile (0.80 km) segment of Woodmere Boulevard north of CR 2, meanwhile, is owned and maintained by the Town of Hempstead.

== Route description ==
=== CR E68 ===
Woodmere Boulevard begins at Hickory Road in the Incorporated Village of Hewlett Neck. It then travels north thence northwest, intersecting Browers Point Branch Road (CR C25). It continues west-northwest before veering northwest, soon intersecting Barberry Lane and entering the Incorporated Village of Woodsburgh. Woodmere Boulevard then continues northwest, again intersecting CR C25. It then continues northwest, intersecting Broadway (CR C22) and entering Woodmere.

Continuing Northwest, it intersects Central Avenue, then crosses the Long Island Rail Road's Far Rockaway Branch, thence intersecting West Broadway (CR E51) shortly thereafter. It then continues north to its intersection with Peninsula Boulevard (CR 2), where the county route designation for Woodmere Boulevard ends and the road continues north as a town-owned residential street.

The entirety of the Nassau County-owned portion of Woodmere Boulevard is classified as a major collector roadway by the New York State Department of Transportation and is eligible for federal aid.

=== North of CR 2 ===
At the north side of its intersection with CR 2, Woodmere Boulevard becomes a local residential street owned by the Town of Hempstead and maintained by the Town of Hempstead Department of Public Works. It veers to the west-northwest, intersecting Green Place before curving back to the northwest and intersecting Clubhouse Road. It then curves north, intersecting Lakeside Drive before eventually making a curve to the east and reaching its northern terminus at Rica Lane shortly thereafter.

The entirety of the Town of Hempstead-owned portion of Woodmere Boulevard is classified as a local road by the New York State Department of Transportation and is not eligible for federal aid.

== History ==
In 1959, the Nassau County Department of Public Works created a numbered highway system as part of their "Master Plan" for its county highways. Pursuant to this Master Plan, Woodmere Boulevard was originally designated as Nassau County Route 93. This route, along with all of the other county routes in Nassau County, became unsigned in the 1970s, when Nassau County officials opted to remove the signs as opposed to allocating the funds for replacing them with new ones that met the latest federal design standards and requirements stated in the federal government's Manual on Uniform Traffic Control Devices.

Subsequently, Nassau County renumbered many of its county roads, with Woodmere Boulevard being renumbered as CR E68.

== Major intersections ==
Location	mi	km	Destinations	Notes
Hewlett Neck–Woodsburgh line	0.00	0.00	Hickory Road	
Hewlett Neck–Woodsburgh line	0.33	0.53	Channel Road	
Hewlett Neck–Woodsburgh line	0.45	0.72	Barberry Lane	
Hewlett Neck–Woodsburgh– Woodmere tripoint	0.55	0.89	Browers Point Branch (CR C25) and Pond Lane	
Woodsburgh–Woodmere line	0.85	1.37	Broadway (CR C22)	
Woodmere	1.11	1.79	Cedar Lane	Access to Woodmere LIRR station
Woodmere	1.25	2.01	West Broadway (CR E51)	
Woodmere	1.59 0.0	2.56 0.0	Peninsula Boulevard (CR 2)	Northern terminus of Nassau County ownership and maintenance, and of the CR E68 route designation; Town of Hempstead ownership and maintenance begins
Woodmere	0.5	0.80	Rica Lane	
1.000 mi = 1.609 km; 1.000 km = 0.621 mi: Route transition

== See also ==
- List of county routes in Nassau County, New York
- Rockaway Turnpike
