= Broadway (Five Towns, New York) =

County highway in Nassau County, New York

- Nassau County Route C22

Route information
- Maintained by NCDPW
- Length: 5.2 mi (8.4 km)

Major junctions
- South end: Harris Street at the Queens–Nassau County border in Lawrence
- NY 878 (Nassau Expressway) in Lawrence; Rockaway Turnpike (CR 257) / Meadow Lane (CR D51) in Lawrence; Woodmere Boulevard (CR E68) at the Woodmere–Woodsburgh border West Broadway (CR E51) in Hewlett; East Rockaway Road (CR C64) in Hewlett; NY 27 (Sunrise Highway) in Lynbrook
- North end: Merrick Road (CR 27) in Lynbrook

Location
- Country: United States
- State: New York
- County: Nassau

Highway system
- County routes in New York; County Routes in Nassau County

Broadway (also known as CR C22 and formerly as CR 54) is a major county highway serving the Five Towns region of the Town of Hempstead, in Nassau County, on Long Island, in New York, United States, running for a total of 5.2 miles (8.4 km) between Lawrence and Lynbrook.

The road, in its entirety, is owned by Nassau County and maintained by the Nassau County Department of Public Works as one of two discontinuous segments of the unsigned Nassau County Route C22 – the other being Broadway in Bethpage.

Map of Broadway (highlighted in red)

== Route description ==
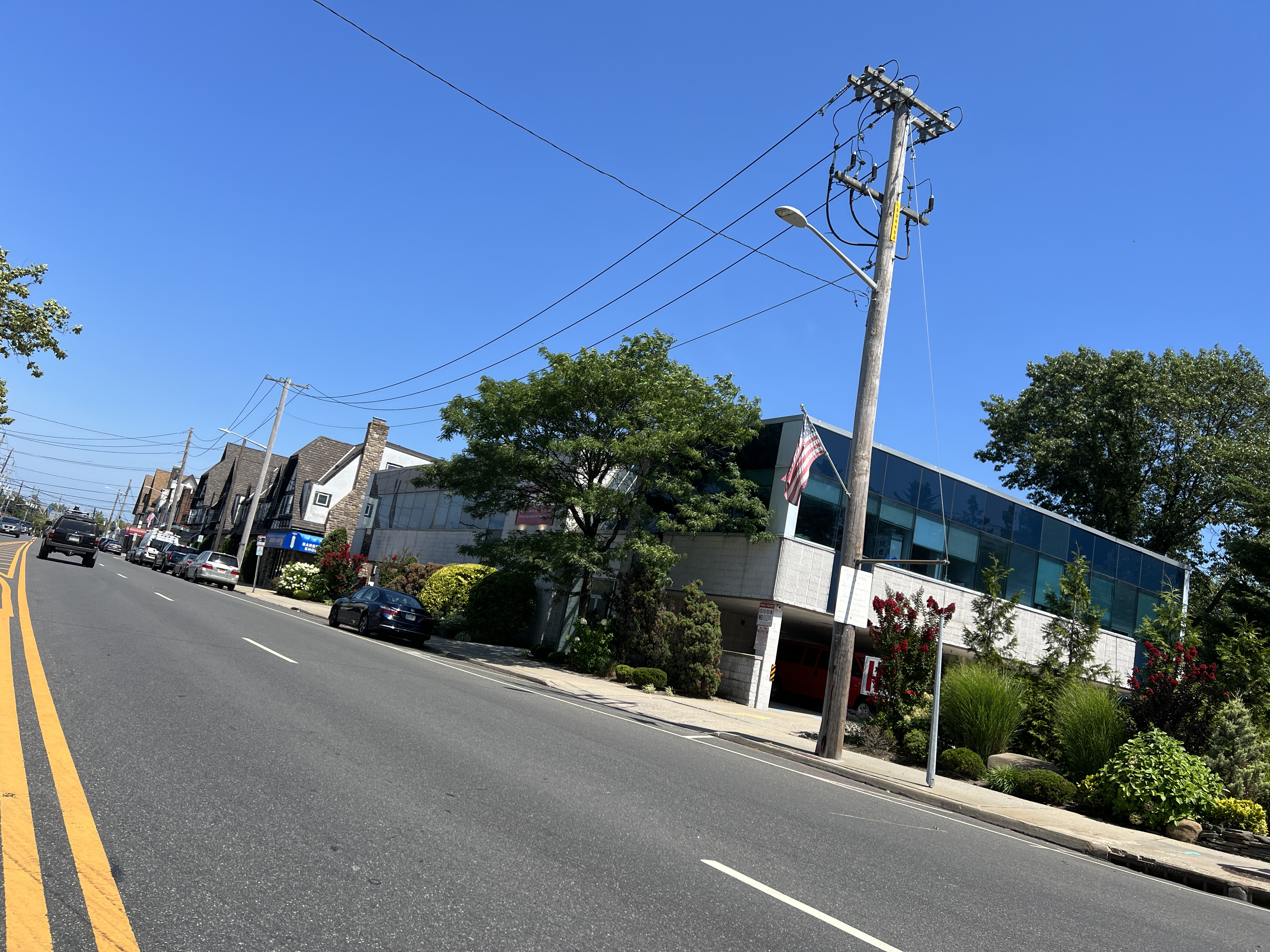
Broadway in Hewlett in 2022

Broadway begins at Harris Street, at the Queens-Nassau County border in Lawrence, as a continuation of Empire Avenue. Continuing towards the east, it soon intersects Doughty Boulevard (CR 75), and then the Nassau Expressway (NY 878) immediately afterwards. It then continues towards the east, eventually intersecting Lawrence Avenue, thence turning towards the northeast until intersecting Rockaway Turnpike (CR 257) and Meadow Lane (CR D51). It then continues on a more easterly path, eventually turning again towards the northeast briefly before turning back towards the east as it enters Woodsburgh. Soon thereafter, Broadway intersects Woodmere Boulevard (CR E68), and then enters Woodmere.

Shortly after entering Woodmere, the road turns northeast again and soon intersects West Broadway (CR E51). It then continues northeast, soon entering Hewlett and intersecting East Rockaway Road (CR C64). It soon thereafter intersects Rockaway Avenue (CR E06), thence entering Lynbrook. Soon thereafter, it intersects Scranton Avenue (CR E18) before reaching Sunrise Highway (NY 27). It then crosses underneath the Long Island Rail Road, and soon thereafter terminates at Merrick Road (CR 27).

Broadway is classified as a minor arterial highway by the New York State Department of Transportation and is eligible for federal aid.

== History ==
Historically, Broadway was the primary north–south thoroughfare through the Five Towns and, more broadly, between the Rockaways and Lynbrook. As the area's population and vehicular traffic grew following World War II, a need for an improved roadway – one that could better accommodate traffic and serve as the area's primary through road, as well as to provide better connections with the rest of Nassau County – became apparent. This prompted Nassau County to reconstruct Peninsula Boulevard (CR 2) slightly west and north of Broadway as a high-capacity arterial roadway, providing a bypass of Broadway and providing a direct link not only between the Rockaways, the Five Towns, and Lynbrook – but eventually also to and from points further north, with that highway being extended to Hempstead village later in the decade. The segment of Peninsula Boulevard bypassing Broadway – between Ocean Avenue in Lynbrook and the intersection of Bay Boulevard and Rockaway Turnpike at the Cederhurst–Inwood border – opened to traffic in 1954.

=== Route number ===
Beginning in 1959, when the Nassau County Department of Public Works created a numbered highway system as part of their "Master Plan" for the county highway system, Broadway was originally designated as County Route 54. This route, along with all of the other county routes in Nassau County, became unsigned in the 1970s, when Nassau County officials opted to remove the signs as opposed to allocating the funds for replacing them with new ones that met the latest federal design standards and requirements stated in the federal government's Manual on Uniform Traffic Control Devices.

== Major intersections ==
Location	mi	km	Destinations	Notes
Lawrence, Nassau County–Queens line	0.00	0.00	Harris Street	Western terminus of CR C22 designation and Nassau County ownership; Broadway continues west into Queens.
Lawrence, Nassau County	0.08	0.13	NY 878 (Nassau Expressway)	At-grade intersection.
Lawrence, Nassau County	0.22	0.35	Lord Avenue	
Lawrence, Nassau County	0.52	0.84	Lawrence Avenue	
Lawrence, Nassau County	0.82	1.32	Weston Place	
Lawrence, Nassau County	0.93	1.50	Rockaway Turnpike (CR 257) / Meadow Lane (CR D51)	
Cedarhurst	1.40	2.25	Waverly Place	
Cedarhurst–Woodmere line	1.89	3.04	Prospect Avenue	
Woodmere	2.02	3.25	Linden Street	
Woodmere–Woodsburgh line	2.12	3.41	Meadow Drive	The border between Woodmere and the Incorporated Village of Woodsburgh runs along the center of Broadway between Meadow Drive and Woodmere Boulevard.
Woodmere–Woodsburgh line	2.37	3.81	Woodmere Boulevard (CR E68)	
Woodmere–Hewlett line	2.75	4.43	Johnson Place	
Hewlett	3.18	5.12	Piermont Avenue	
Hewlett	3.21	5.17	West Broadway (CR E51)	
Hewlett	3.44	5.54	East Rockaway Road (CR C64)	
Hewlett	4.04	6.50	Rockaway Avenue (CR E06) / Sheridan Avenue	
Lynbrook	4.70	7.56	Scranton Avenue (CR E18)	
Lynbrook	4.79	7.71	Olive Place	
Lynbrook	4.90	7.89	Union Place	
Lynbrook	5.03	8.10	NY 27 (Sunrise Highway)	At-grade intersection.
Lynbrook	5.10	8.21	Langdon Place	
Lynbrook	5.20	8.37	Merrick Road (CR 27)	End of CR C22; merges into Hempstead Avenue (CR D09).
1.000 mi = 1.609 km; 1.000 km = 0.621 mi

== Transportation ==
As of September 2025, two Nassau Inter-County Express (NICE) bus routes travel along portions of Broadway: the n31 and n32. The n31 travels along Broadway in Lynbrook, while the n32 also runs along it through the Hewletts and Woodmere; both buses run between Far Rockaway, Queens and the Rosa Parks Hempstead Transit Center in Hempstead village.

== See also ==
- List of county routes in Nassau County, New York
- West Broadway (Five Towns, New York)
- Peninsula Boulevard
