= West Broadway (Five Towns, New York) =

County highway in Nassau County, New York

- Nassau County Route E51
- West Broadway highlighted in red

Route information
- Maintained by NCDPW
- Length: 2.15 mi (3.46 km)

Major junctions
- South end: Rockaway Turnpike (CR 257) / Burnside Avenue (CR C27) in Cedarhurst
- Prospect Avenue in Cedarhurst; Woodmere Boulevard (CR E68) in Woodmere; Franklin Avenue in Hewlett; Mill Road (CR D58) in Hewlett
- North end: Broadway (CR C22) in Hewlett

Location
- Country: United States
- State: New York
- County: Nassau

Highway system
- County routes in New York; County Routes in Nassau County

West Broadway is a major, 2.15-mile (3.46 km) road between Cedarhurst and Hewlett in the Five Towns area of Nassau County, New York, United States.

Owned by Nassau County and maintained by the Nassau County Department of Public Works, the road, in its entirety, is designated as the unsigned County Route E51.

== Route description ==
West Broadway begins at an intersection with Rockaway Turnpike (CR 257) and Burnside Avenue (CR C27) in the Incorporated Village of Cedarhurst; a traffic triangle, featuring a park, is present at the intersection, along West Broadway. From there, it then winds its way through the village, soon reaching Prospect Avenue. It then enters Woodmere, continuing east-northeast to Woodmere Boulevard (CR E68).

From its intersection with Woodmere Boulevard, West Broadway then continues east-northeast, entering Hewlett and reaching Mill Road (CR D58), thence crossing the Long Island Rail Road's Far Rockaway Branch and ending at Broadway (CR C22), ultimately merging into it.

West Broadway is primarily classified as a major collector roadway by the New York State Department of Transportation – although its westernmost and easternmost ends are classified as a minor arterial highway. The entirety of the road is eligible for federal aid.

Much like Broadway to its south, West Broadway has long been one of the major thoroughfares through the Five Towns.

== History ==
In the 1940s, there was a failed proposal to eliminate West Broadway's grade crossing by elevating the Far Rockaway Branch through the area. West Broadway would then pass underneath the tracks. However, this project never materialized, and as of 2026, the grade crossing remains.

In the 1950s, when Nassau County upgraded and extended Peninsula Boulevard to serve as the main thoroughfare through the Five Towns, West Broadway – like Broadway, itself – was bypassed, in turn providing traffic relief along the corridor.

=== Route number ===
Beginning in 1959, when the Nassau County Department of Public Works created a numbered highway system as part of their "Master Plan" for the county highway system, West Broadway was originally designated as County Route 10. This route, along with all of the other county routes in Nassau County, became unsigned in the 1970s, when Nassau County officials opted to remove the signs as opposed to allocating the funds for replacing them with new ones that met the latest federal design standards and requirements stated in the federal government's Manual on Uniform Traffic Control Devices. Subsequently, Nassau County renumbered many of its county roads, with West Broadway being renumbered as CR E51.

== Major intersections ==
| Location | mi | km | Destinations | Notes |
|---|---|---|---|---|
| Cedarhurst–Lawrence, Nassau County line | 0.00 | 0.00 | Rockaway Turnpike (CR 257) and Burnside Avenue (CR C27) | Roadway continues west as Burnside Avenue (CR C27) |
| Cedarhurst | 0.77 | 1.24 | Prospect Avenue | |
| Woodmere | 1.35 | 2.17 | Woodmere Boulevard (CR E68) | |
| Hewlett | 1.92 | 3.09 | Franklin Avenue | Access to Hewlett LIRR station |
| Hewlett | 2.07 | 3.33 | Mill Road (CR D58) | |
| Hewlett | 2.15 | 3.46 | Broadway (CR C22) | Merges into Broadway |
1.000 mi = 1.609 km; 1.000 km = 0.621 mi

== Transportation ==
As of September 2025, one Nassau Inter-County Express (NICE) bus route travels along West Broadway: the n31. This bus route travels along the entire road and runs between Far Rockaway, Queens and the Rosa Parks Hempstead Transit Center in the Village of Hempstead.

== See also ==
- Broadway (Five Towns, New York)
- Peninsula Boulevard
