= Woodmere station =

Long Island Rail Road station in Nassau County, New York

Woodmere
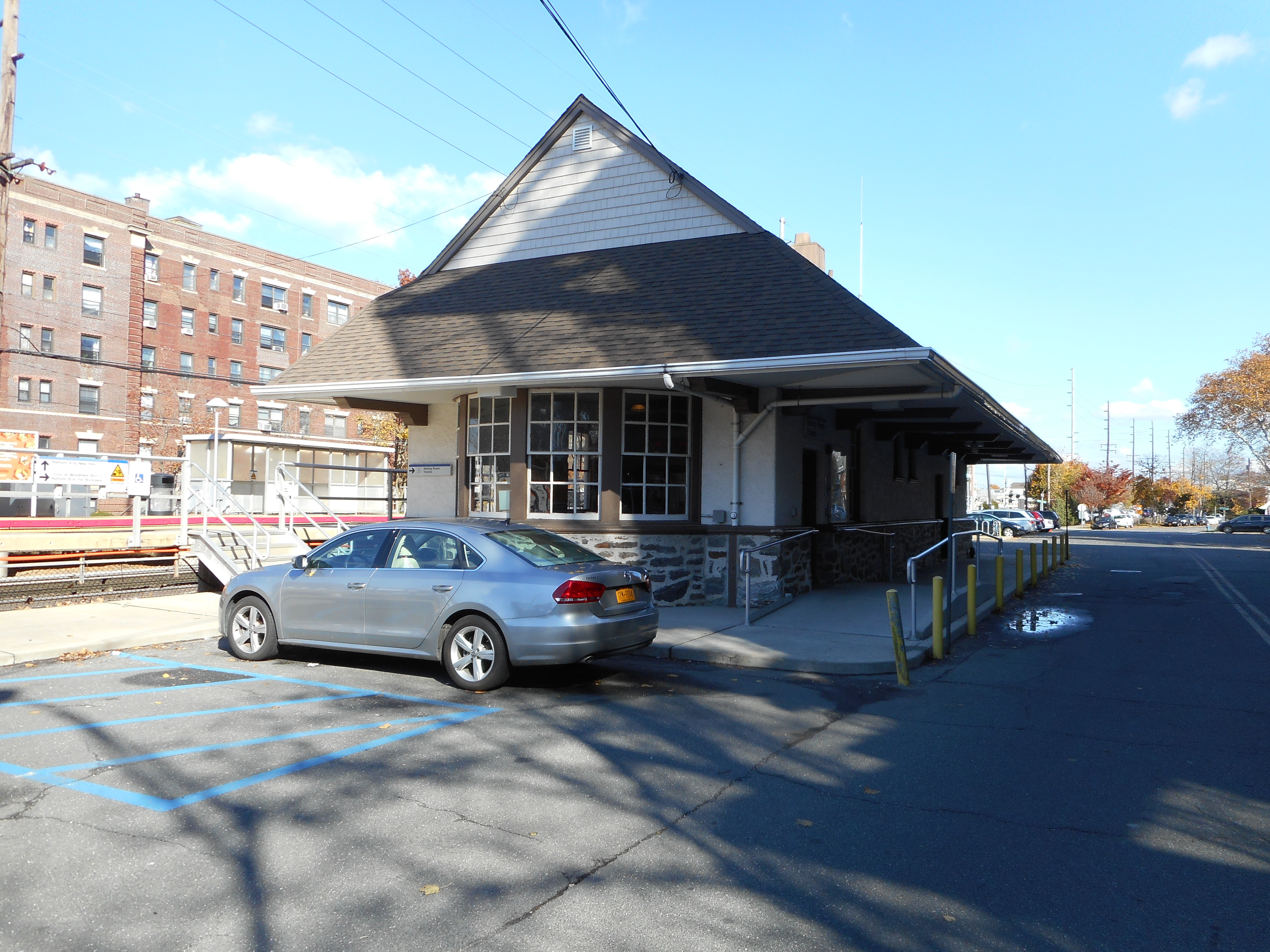
- The Woodmere station in 2014, as seen from Cedar Lane

General information
- Location: Woodmere Boulevard and Cedar Lane; Woodmere, New York
- Coordinates: 40.6316°N 73.7133°W
- Owner: Long Island Rail Road
- Line: Far Rockaway Branch
- Platforms: 2 side platforms
- Tracks: 2
- Connections: Nassau Inter-County Express: n32

Construction
- Parking: Yes
- Cycle facilities: Yes; Bike Rack
- Accessible: Yes

Other information
- Station code: WMR
- Fare zone: 4

History
- Opened: October 1869 (SSRRLI)
- Closed: 1872
- Rebuilt: 1885, 1902, 1968
- Electrified: December 11, 1905; 750 V (DC) third rail
- Former names: Wood's Station (1869–unknown); Woodsburgh (unknown–1897)

Passengers
- 2012–2014: 1,767 per weekday

Services
Preceding station	Long Island Rail Road	Following station
Hewlett toward Penn Station or Grand Central	Far Rockaway Branch	Cedarhurst toward Far Rockaway
Former services
Preceding station	Long Island Rail Road	Following station
Hewlett toward Valley Stream	Far Rockaway Branch	Cedarhurst toward Hammels
Hewlett toward Gibson	Rockaway Beach Division	Cedarhurst toward Woodside
Location

Woodmere is a station on the Long Island Rail Road's Far Rockaway Branch in Woodmere, in the Town of Hempstead in Nassau County, New York, United States. The station is located at Woodmere Boulevard and Cedar Lane, between Central Avenue and West Broadway.

== History ==
Woodmere station was originally built by the South Side Railroad of Long Island in 1869. Depending on the source, it was established in either July or October. It was originally listed on SSRRLI's timetable as "Wood's station," then "Woodsburgh" before being given its current name. The station was discontinued on July 13, 1872, but reestablished on January 16, 1885. Beginning in May 1885, the station also included the Cedarhurst Railway, a trolley line to Lawrence along the border of Hewlett Harbor at the coast of Brosewere Bay for approximately 10 years.

The second depot was built in 1902, and was electrified with the rest of the line three years later. The 1902-built station originally had a canopy above the Valley Stream-bound platform, that extended southwest of the station house, and another one above Cedar Lane designed to protect horse carriage passengers from rain, snow, and other inclement weather. A freight house also existed across the tracks. The canopy for horse carriages was abandoned around 1939. The track-side covered platforms were removed with the installation of high-level platforms sometime around 1968. Aside from these modifications, the station still exists as it was built in 1902.

== Station layout ==
This station has two high-level side platforms, each 10 car-lengths.
