= Peninsula Boulevard =

Road on Long Island, New York

County Route 2
- Peninsula Boulevard
- Peninsula Boulevard highlighted in dark red

Route information
- Maintained by NCDPW
- Length: 9.1 mi (14.6 km)
- Existed: 1950s–present

Major junctions
- West end: Rockaway Turnpike (CR 257) / Bay Boulevard (CR 2A) in Cedarhurst
- NY 27 in Lynbrook; Southern State Parkway in South Hempstead; NY 102 in Hempstead
- East end: NY 24 in Hempstead

Location
- Country: United States
- State: New York
- County: Nassau

Highway system
- County routes in New York; County Routes in Nassau County

Peninsula Boulevard is a major 9.1-mile-long (14.6 km) boulevard through southwestern Nassau County, on Long Island, in New York, United States. It runs southwest-to-northeast between Cedarhurst in the Five Towns area and the Village of Hempstead – in addition to indirectly serving The Rockaways in Queens.

For its entire length, Peninsula Boulevard is maintained by the Nassau County Department of Public Works as the unsigned County Route 2.

== Route description ==
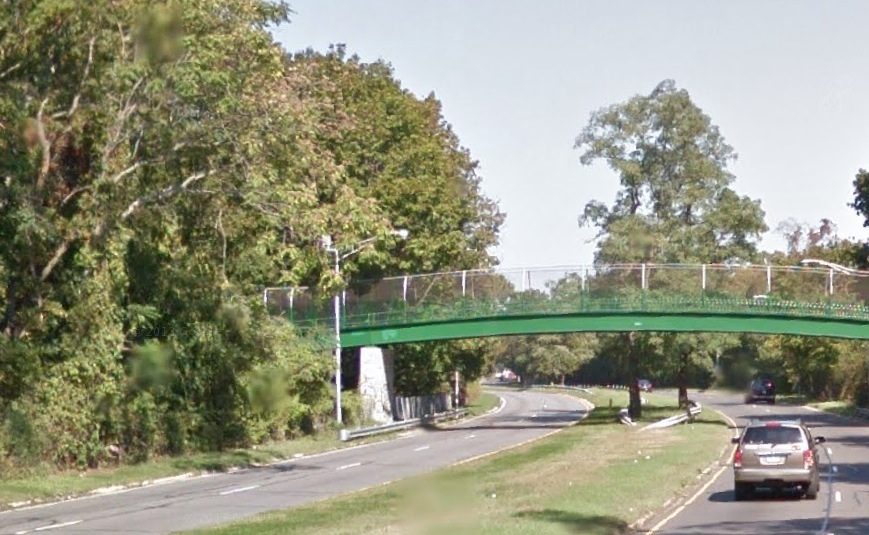
Peninsula Boulevard in Hempstead Lake State Park

Peninsula Boulevard begins in the Village of Cedarhurst at Rockaway Turnpike, near a connecting road to the Nassau Expressway (NY 878), and runs through the Five Towns area, where it spends much of its journey running northeast and southwest as a four-lane undivided thoroughfare. In Hewlett, it becomes a divided highway at Franklin Street and then runs beneath a bridge for the Far Rockaway Branch of the Long Island Rail Road between Mill Road and Gibson Boulevard.

After Gibson Boulevard, Peninsula Boulevard's median becomes wider as it winds towards Rockaway Avenue, only to return to its former stature a short distance later. Within Lynbrook, the road takes a sharp northern trajectory after the intersection with Sunrise Highway (NY 27) and almost immediately runs beneath the Lynbrook Long Island Rail Road station. CR 2 returns to the northeast at South Niemann Avenue, and then intersects Merrick Road shortly thereafter and thence Ocean Avenue.

After Ocean Avenue, CR 2 runs as a four-lane expressway along the southeastern edge of Hempstead Lake State Park. This divided portion closely follows the original route of the Southern State Parkway, which was originally built before the parkway's current route was constructed across Hempstead Lake. Between Lakeview Avenue and the Southern State Parkway, it enters Rockville Centre, where it contains residential frontage roads on the east side, and pedestrian bridges over the road, the first being Lakeside Drive, and the second being North Village Avenue (CR D65). The segment along North Village Avenue closely follows a former segment of the Southern State Parkway, and it straddles the Rockville Centre–Lakeview border. The second of these frontage roads ends at Mercy Hospital on the southeast corner of the interchange with the current Southern State Parkway at Exit 19 in South Hempstead, where CR 2 reverts to a four-lane boulevard.

Beyond the Southern State Parkway, the road maintains its status as a divided highway even as it enters the Village of Hempstead, where it briefly turns east as it intersects Franklin, Greenwich, and Henry Streets. It is at the latter where the road turns back to the northeast to serve as the southern terminus of Clinton Street (CR 1), which leads to Glen Cove Road, then intersects Front Street (NY 102), and finally terminates at Fulton Avenue (NY 24).

Peninsula Boulevard, in its entirety, is designated as a principal arterial highway by the New York State Department of Transportation.

== History ==
Peninsula Boulevard was constructed in its current form in the 1950s by Nassau County as its first major north–south arterial highway. Its construction enabled better access between the Five Towns, the South Shore, and the Rockaway Peninsula with Hempstead and more northerly portions of the county – and would help to alleviate traffic on Broadway to its south.

The segment of the highway between Ocean Avenue in Lynbrook and the Bay Boulevard/Rockaway Turnpike intersection at the Cederhurst–Inwood border officially opened on July 11, 1954. During this phase of the construction of Peninsula Boulevard, the Long Island Rail Road's Far Rockaway Branch was elevated to pass above the road in Woodmere, while the existing segments of the original Peninsula Boulevard – located in Cedarhurst – were upgraded and extended north. In 1958, Nassau County had finished construction on the widening of a 1.59-mile (2.56 km) segment of the highway in Hempstead, south to the Southern State Parkway.

The constriction of the segment in Rockville Centre experienced many challenges. As Robert Moses, the chair of the Long Island State Park Commission, had originally refused to allow Nassau County to reuse the old alignment of the Southern State Parkway and the Lynbrook Spur as Peninsula Boulevard through Hempstead Lake State Park, prompting the county to propose widening North Village Avenue to a four-lane, divided highway. Over 2,000 Rockville Centre area residents protested the proposal. In mid-October 1952, Moses and the LISPC donated portions of the land along the route of the original parkway to Nassau County for the constriction of the route north to the Southern State Parkway, thus eliminating the need to widen North Village Avenue, which would instead remain a residential street and serve as a frontage road. Construction on this segment of Peninsula Boulevard was ultimately approved by Nassau County on April 26, 1954.

=== Route shields ===
Former route shield for Peninsula Boulevard (CR 2)

Peninsula Boulevard, along with all of the other county routes in Nassau County, became unsigned in the 1970s, when Nassau County officials opted to remove the signs as opposed to allocating the funds for replacing them with new ones that met the latest federal design standards and requirements, as per the federal government's Manual on Uniform Traffic Control Devices.

== Major intersections ==
The entire route is in Nassau County. All exits are unnumbered.

| Location | mi | km | Destinations | Notes |
|---|---|---|---|---|
| Cedarhurst | 0.00 | 0.00 | Rockaway Turnpike (CR 257) / Bay Boulevard (CR 2A) | Southern terminus |
| Lynbrook | 3.81 | 6.13 | NY 27 (Sunrise Highway) | No left turns |
| Lynbrook | 4.95 | 7.97 | Southern end of limited-access section | |
| Lakeview–Rockville Centre line | 5.79 | 9.32 | Hempstead Lake State Park | No northbound entrance; access via Lake Drive |
| Lakeview–Rockville Centre line | 5.79 | 9.32 | North Village Avenue | No southbound entrance |
| South Hempstead | 7.32 | 11.78 | Northern end of limited-access section | |
| South Hempstead | 7.32 | 11.78 | Southern State Parkway – New York, East Islip | Exits 19S-N on Southern State Parkway |
| Village of Hempstead | 8.86 | 14.26 | NY 102 (Front Street) | |
| Village of Hempstead | 9.11 | 14.66 | NY 24 (Fulton Avenue) | Northern terminus |
1.000 mi = 1.609 km; 1.000 km = 0.621 mi: Incomplete access

== Bay Boulevard (CR 2A) ==
County Route 2A
- Bay Boulevard
- Location: Cedarhurst
- Length: 0.14 mi (230 m)
- Existed: 1950s–present

Bay Boulevard (County Route 2A) is a short, 0.14-mile (0.23 km) extension of Peninsula Boulevard in Cedarhurst. It connects Peninsula Boulevard (CR 2) with the Nassau Expressway (NY 878) to its west.

Like all other county routes in Nassau County, CR 2A became unsigned in the 1970s, when Nassau County officials opted to remove the signs as opposed to allocating the funds for replacing them with new ones that met the latest federal design standards and requirements, as per the federal government's Manual on Uniform Traffic Control Devices.

=== Route description ===
CR 2A runs begins at an intersection at Rockaway Turnpike (CR 257) and Peninsula Boulevard (CR 2) – its parent route. From there, it continues west to an at-grade intersection with the Nassau Expressway (NY 878), where the CR 2A designation terminates; county ownership ends at this intersection. From there, the road continues west into an industrial area.

== See also ==
- List of county routes in Nassau County, New York
- Broadway (Five Towns, New York)
- West Broadway (Five Towns, New York)
