= Steven T. Ross =

American military historian (1937–2018)

- Born: Steven T. Ross; July 4, 1937; Hewlett, New York, U.S.
- Died: August 12, 2018 (aged 81)
- Resting place: Middletown, Rhode Island
- Education: Williams College
- Alma mater: Princeton University
- Awards: United States Navy Meritorious Civilian Service Award
- Scientific career
- Fields: Military history
- Workplaces: University of Nebraska–Lincoln

Steven T. Ross (July 4, 1937 – August 12, 2018) was an American military historian.

Steven T. Ross was born to Ruth Ross and Michael Ross and raised in Hewlett, New York. Ross graduated from Williams College and earned a doctorate from Princeton University and taught at the University of Nebraska–Lincoln and the University of Texas before joining the United States Naval War College faculty, where he remained for thirty years and was named the William V. Pratt Chair in Military History. He also served as a visiting professor at Yale University and Williams College, worked for the Defense Intelligence Agency as a military analyst and was a scholar-in-residence at the Central Intelligence Agency. He was awarded the United States Navy Meritorious Civilian Service Award.

He died on August 12, 2018, aged 81, and was buried at Beth Olam Cemetery on Wyatt Road in Middletown, Rhode Island.

== Publications ==
- European diplomatic history, 1789-1815 : France against Europe (1969, 1981)
- The French Revolution : conflict or continuity? (1971)
- Quest for victory: French military strategy, 1792-1799 (1973)
- From Flintlock to Rifle : infantry tactics, 1740-1866 (1979)
- French military history, 1661-1799 : a guide to the literature (1984)
- Napoleon and maneuver warfare (1985)
- American war plans, 1945-1950 (1988)
- American war plans, 1941-1945: the test of battle (1997)
- Historical dictionary of the wars of the French Revolution (1998)
- U.S. war plans, 1939-1945 (2000)
- American war plans, 1890-1939 (2002)
