= Five Towns Jewish Times =

Newspaper

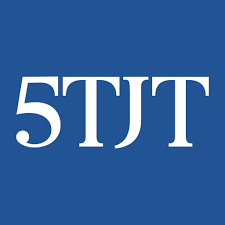
- Type: Weekly newspaper
- Publisher: Larry Gordon
- Editor: Larry Gordon
- Headquarters: Lawrence, Nassau County, New York
- OCLC number: 64196802
- Website: 5tjt.com

Five Towns Jewish Times is a weekly newspaper serving the Jewish communities of the Five Towns in southwestern Nassau County, New York, and the greater New York area, covering the area's large and growing Orthodox Jewish community.

== History ==
The publisher of the Five Towns Jewish Times is Larry Gordon. Gordon founded the paper in response to attempts by the village of Lawrence to limit the establishment and growth of local Orthodox synagogues. Gordon wrote a series of articles for the local Nassau Herald, which resulted in an abrupt policy reversal. Gordon established the Five Towns Jewish Times to serve the local Orthodox community with its own media. Originally published twice a month, it is now published 50 times a year.

The paper is distributed every Thursday on newsstands and in synagogues and Jewish community centers. It is distributed for free on Long Island and sold for $1.00 in New York City and to weekly subscribers. The weekly print run is 20,000 papers.
