= Seawane Country Club =

Country club in Hewlett Harbor, New York

Coordinates: 40°37′59″N 73°41′17″W

- Interactive map of Seawane Country Club

Club information
- Location: Hewlett Harbor, NY
- Established: 1927
- Type: Private
- Tota holes: 18
- Website: www.seawane.com
- Designed by: Devereux Emmet
- Par: 72
- Length: 6,725 yards
- Course rating: 74.7

The Seawane Club is a private golf and country club in Hewlett Harbor, New York. It contains an 18-hole golf course, 7 tennis courts, 2 pickleball courts, a padel court, a basketball court, a swimming pool, a bar, restaurant, grill room, men's and women's card room, men's and women's locker rooms, masseur complete health club facilities with trainers and barbershop. In 2004, it was awarded the New York Sports Writers Association Golf Club of the year.

== Description ==
The club is located at 1300 Club Drive in Hewlett Harbor in Nassau County, New York. It is on the South Shore and borders an inlet of Hewlett Bay. The club's name originates from the word "sewan," beads used as wampum by Native Americans.

== See also ==
- Rockaway Hunting Club
