= Lynch Triangle =

Green space in Queens, New York

Coordinates: 40°41′5.2″N 73°51′36″W

Reverend Lawrence E. Lynch Memorial Triangle – also known colloquially as Lynch Triangle – is a 0.138-acre (0.056-hectare) park located at the intersection of Rockaway Boulevard, Atlantic Avenue, and 81st Street in Ozone Park, Queens, New York City.

== History ==
The neighborhood's streets were laid out in a grid of streets and avenues at the turn of the 20th century while Rockaway Boulevard cuts diagonally through the grid on its route between Cypress Hills and Woodmere. Triangular intersections that were too small to be developed were designated as public plazas, including this one. In 1949, the city designated this triangle in memory of Lynch, a Woodhaven resident who served as a chaplain in the Pacific Theater during World War Two.

Lawrence Lynch was born in Brooklyn in 1917, one of twelve children of devout Catholic parents who emigrated from Ireland. He served as an altar boy at the St. Sylvester church and was ordained as a priest in 1932 through the Redemptorist Order.

During World War Two he was assigned as chaplain the legendary Fighting 69th Infantry of the National Guard, where he earned the nickname Father Cyclone for his tireless efforts to comfort the injured and ill of all faiths. He was killed at age 38 on April 25, 1945, during the Battle of Okinawa, while administering Last Rites to a dying soldier. Lynch was buried at the Redemptorist Cemetery, Mount Saint Alphonsus, in Esopus, New York. Although the triangle was named for Lynch in 1949, the sign carrying the name disappeared and the honor was forgotten for more than a half century.

In 2018, Ed Wendell, President of Woodhaven Cultural and Historical Society, approached Councilman Eric Ulrich to have the triangle rededicated for Lynch. On March 10, 2019, the triangle was officially named for Lynch with a ceremony that commemorated his actions during the war.

== See also ==
- List of parks in New York City
