= William Modell =

American businessman (1921–2008)

William D. Modell
- Born: May 13, 1921; Manhattan, New York City, New York, U.S.
- Died: February 14, 2008 (aged 86); New York City, New York, U.S.
- Education: B.A. New York University
- Occupation: businessman
- Known for: Chair of the Modell's Sporting Goods

William D. Modell (May 13, 1921 – February 14, 2008) was an American businessman who chaired the Modell's Sporting Goods retail chain.

== Early life ==
Modell was born on May 13, 1921 to a Jewish family. He grew up in the Manhattan Beach neighborhood of Brooklyn, New York, before attending New York University. He enlisted in the United States Army during World War II.

== Modell's Sporting Goods ==
William Modell first became involved in Modell's Sporting Goods, a family business, after World War II. The store had been founded in 1889 by Modell's Hungarian immigrant grandfather, Morris Modell, who opened the first store on Cortlandt Street in Lower Manhattan. Modell's Sporting Goods grew rapidly after World War I by stocking up on leftover army surplus and selling it at low prices.

William Modell became chairman of the company in 1985, but had effectively run the company with his father, Henry Modell, who was chairman of the Modell's, since 1963. His expansion strategy for the company involved buying locations from faltering rivals in the sporting goods business. For example, under Modell the company paid $2.5 million for fifteen locations from bankrupt rival, Herman's World of Sporting Goods in 1996. This acquisition expanded the number of Modell's Sporting Goods stores from 52 to 67 stores and increased the company's presence in New Jersey and the Baltimore-Washington D.C. areas.

In 2008, the company operated 136 retail locations across eight states, with a 2007 annual revenue of approximately $635 million.

== Personal life ==
In 1949, Modell married Shelby Zaldin. They had three children: a daughter, Leslie Modell; and two sons, Mitchell, the current CEO of the Modell's Sporting Goods, and Michael, who suffered from Crohn's disease, an inflammation of the digestive tract. Michael died in 2001. He was a resident of Hewlett Harbor, New York.

In 1967, Modell founded the Crohn's and Colitis Foundation of America, a non-profit, volunteer-driven organization dedicated to finding cures for Crohn's disease and ulcerative colitis and improving the quality of life of its victims.

== Death ==
William Modell died in Manhattan on February 14, 2008, of complications from prostate cancer at the age of 86.
