= Rockaway Boulevard =

Road in Queens and Nassau County, New York

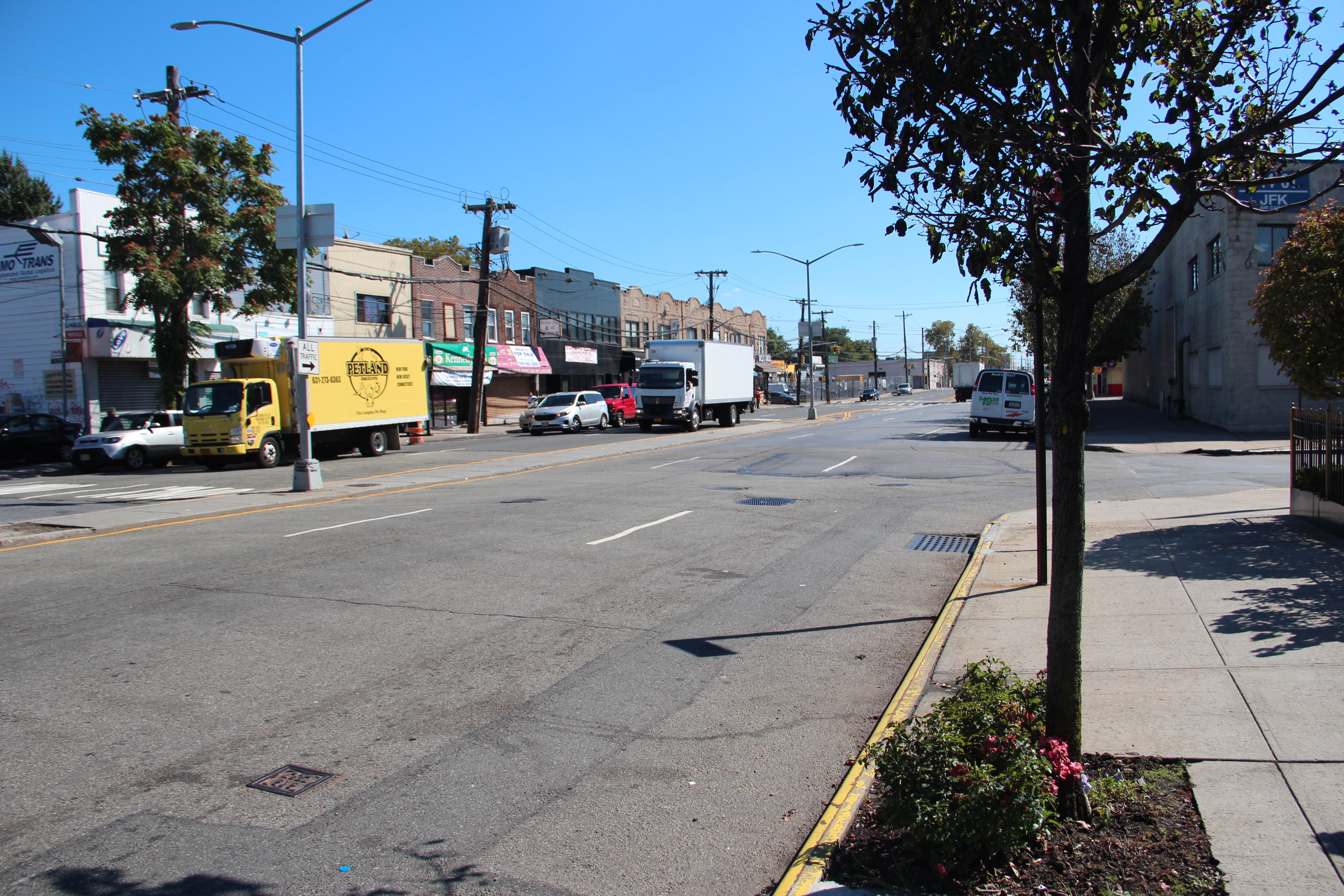
- In Springfield Gardens
- Former names: Rockaway Road; Rockaway Plank Road
- Owner: City of New York and State of New York (Queens portion); County of Nassau (Nassau County portion)
- Maintained by: NYCDOT and NYSDOT (Queens portion); NCDPW (Nassau County portion)
- Length: 9.36 mi (15.06 km)
- Location: Queens and Nassau County, New York
- Nearest metro station: Rockaway Boulevard
- West end: Eldert Lane in Woodhaven
- Major junctions: I-678 in South Ozone Park; NY 27 / Belt Parkway in Springfield Gardens; NY 878 in Springfield Gardens; East Avenue in Meadowmere; NY 878 in Inwood; Peninsula Boulevard (CR 2) in Cedarhurst; Burnside Avenue (CR C27) / West Broadway (CR E51) in Cedarhurst; Central Avenue in Lawrence
- East end: Broadway (CR C22) in Lawrence

Rockaway Boulevard is a major 9.36-mile (15.06 km) road in southern Queens and Nassau County, on Long Island, in New York, United States.

Within Queens, the portions east of 182nd Street to the Queens–Nassau border are owned by the State of New York and designated as the unsigned New York State Reference Route 909G. Within Nassau County, the road is known as Rockaway Turnpike and is designated as the unsigned Nassau County Route 257.

Unlike the similarly named Rockaway Beach Boulevard and Rockaway Freeway, it serves mainland Queens and does not enter the Rockaways.

== Route description ==
=== In New York City ===
Rockaway Boulevard begins as an undivided road at Eldert Lane, a small one-way street that runs along the border between Queens and Brooklyn. West of Atlantic Avenue, it is a two-lane road. When it crosses Atlantic Avenue, it widens to four lanes.

Rockaway Boulevard generally runs east-southeast. It crosses the Van Wyck Expressway (I-678) and the Belt Parkway. Just south of the parkway, the Queens (western) segment of the Nassau Expressway (NY 878) ends at Rockaway Boulevard, in a Y-shaped, at-grade junction. Rockaway Boulevard becomes a six-lane divided road at this point and continues southeast to the Queens-Nassau border, where ownership and maintenance by Nassau County begins and the road's name changes from Rockaway Boulevard to Rockaway Turnpike; this location is the western terminus of the CR 257 designation.

=== In Nassau County (CR 257) ===
Upon entering Nassau County, the road's name changes to Rockaway Turnpike, and the Nassau County Route 257 designation begins. It continues south-southeast through Meadowmere Park and Inwood, soon reaching an at-grade junction with the Nassau County (eastern) segment of the Nassau Expressway (NY 878), which branches away, towards Atlantic Beach. Rockaway Turnpike then continues straight for one block, where it intersects Peninsula Boulevard (CR 2).

Continuing south-southeast from Peninsula Boulevard, Rockaway Turnpike – now running along the border between the Village of Cedarhurst and the unincorporated hamlet of Inwood – eventually intersects Burnside Avenue (CR C27) and West Broadway (CR E51). It continues straight from there – still following the Cedarhurst–Inwood border – and eventually intersects Mott Avenue and thence Pearsall Avenue, before immediately reaching a grade crossing with the Long Island Rail Road's Far Rockaway Branch and entering the Village of Lawrence.

Upon crossing the LIRR tracks and entering Lawrence, Rockaway Turnpike continues straight and soon intersects Central Avenue, before reaching Broadway (CR C22) – the eastern terminus of both Rockaway Turnpike and the CR 257 designation.

South of Broadway, the roadway continues east, south, and west through Lawrence as Meadow Lane (CR D51), which eventually becomes Rock Hall Road (CR D50) and ultimately ends at the Nassau Expressway (NY 878).

== History ==
Rockaway Boulevard and Rockaway Turnpike were formerly known as Rockaway Road (or Rockaway Plank Road) and the Jamaica and Rockaway Turnpike. The portion of Rockaway Turnpike in Queens (a separate road towards Jamaica) is now called Sutphin Boulevard.

== Parks ==
As Rockaway Boulevard cuts diagonally through the rectangular street grid of southeastern Queens, triangular intersections that were too small to develop were designated as parks. These include Legion Triangle, Dixon Triangle, Lynch Triangle, Ruoff Triangle, Corporal Ruoff Square, Wellbrook Triangle, O'Connell Square, Catholic War Veterans Triangle, and Sergeant Colyer Square. Larger parks along the route include Playground One Forty, Baisley Pond Park, and Idlewild Park.

== Transportation ==
Rockaway Boulevard is served by the following bus routes:

- The IND Fulton Street Line (A train) of the New York City Subway has a station located at the intersection of Cross Bay, Rockaway, Woodhaven Boulevards, and Liberty Avenue.
- The Q7 is the primary bus server of the boulevard, running west of 150th Street.
- The Q6 runs on the corridor between Sutphin Boulevard and Farmers Boulevard.
- The Q113 and Q114 run between Guy R. Brewer Boulevard and Nassau Expressway. The Q113 heads west on the expressway, while the Q114 continues on the Turnpike portion to Mott Avenue. It is joined by the n31 from West Broadway, which continues until Central Avenue.
- The Q40 runs between 143rd and 142nd Streets.
- Q10 buses serve the boulevard between 130th Street and Lefferts Boulevard.
- From there, the Q37 takes over until 111th Street. Buses that serve Aqueduct Racetrack/Resorts Casino continue west until Aqueduct Road.
- The Q41 runs between 109th Avenue and either 94th Street (Howard Beach) or Liberty Avenue (Jamaica). Westbound service is supplemented by the Q112.
- The Q51 runs between Linden Boulevard and either Liberty Avenue (Ozone Park) or 99th Street (Cambria Heights).

== See also ==
- List of county routes in Nassau County, New York
- Little Neck Parkway
- Merrick Road
