= Hewlett Bay Park, New York =

- Village
- Incorporated Village of Hewlett Bay Park
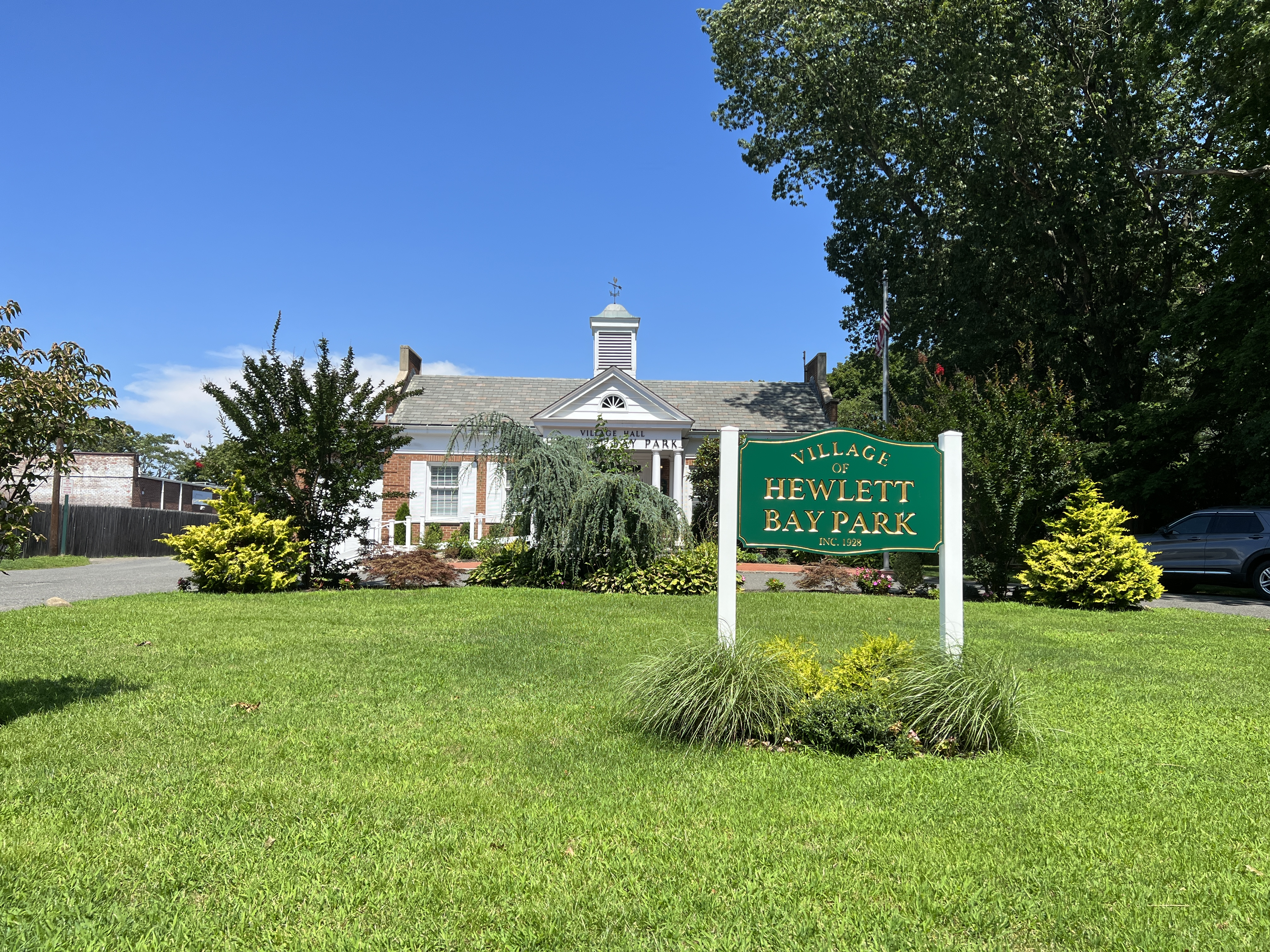
- Hewlett Bay Park Village Hall in 2022

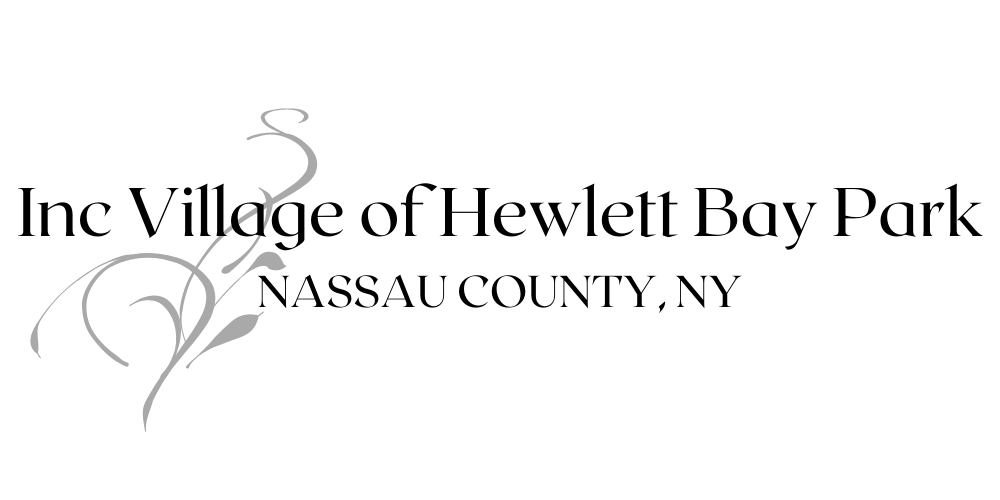
- Flag logo

- Location within Nassau County and the state of New York

- Location on Long Island Location within the state of New York
- Coordinates: 40°38′7″N 73°41′44″W
- Country: United States
- State: New York
- County: Nassau
- Town: Hempstead
- Incorporated: 1928

Government
  - Mayor: Alex Salomon

Area
  - Total: 0.36 sq mi (0.93 km^{2})
  - Land: 0.34 sq mi (0.87 km^{2})
  - Water: 0.023 sq mi (0.06 km^{2})
- Elevation: 9.8 ft (3 m)

Population (2020)
  - Total: 494
  - Density: 1,463.4/sq mi (565.02/km^{2})
- Time zone: UTC-5 (Eastern (EST))
  - Summer (DST): UTC-4 (EDT)
- ZIP Code: 11557 (Hewlett)
- Area codes: 516, 363
- FIPS code: 36-34297
- GNIS feature ID: 0952662
- Website: hewlettbayparkny.gov

Hewlett Bay Park is a village located within the Town of Hempstead in Nassau County, on the South Shore of Long Island, in New York, United States. The population was 494 at the time of the 2020 census.

The area, like Back/Old Lawrence is unique because its rural affluence is similar in character to the more well known Gold Coast of the North Shore instead of being more urbanized like the rest of the South Shore of Nassau County.

Hewlett Bay Park is usually included as one of the Five Towns in the southwestern corner of Nassau County. In the context of the Five Towns, "The Hewletts" or "Hewlett" is often used to refer collectively to the hamlet of Hewlett, together with the villages of Hewlett Bay Park, Hewlett Harbor and Hewlett Neck. The Five Towns is usually said to comprise the villages of Lawrence and Cedarhurst, the hamlets of Woodmere and Inwood, and "The Hewletts", along with Woodsburgh.

== History ==
Hewlett Bay Park incorporated as a village in 1928.

== Geography ==
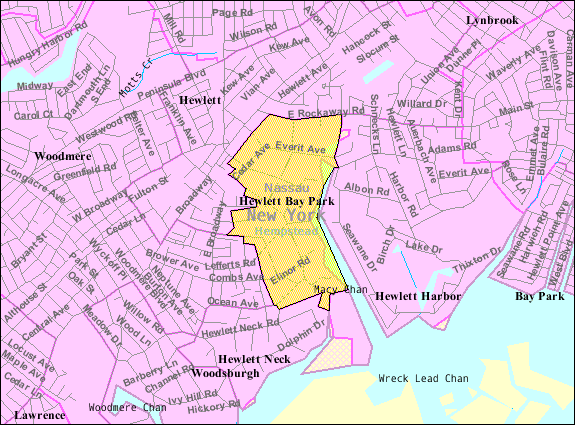
U.S. Census map of Hewlett Bay Park.

According to the United States Census Bureau, the village has a total area of 0.4 square miles (1.0 km^{2}), of which 0.3 square miles (0.78 km^{2}) is land and 0.04 square miles (0.10 km^{2}), or 5.41%, is water.

== Demographics ==
Historical population
| Census | Pop. | Note | %± |
|---|---|---|---|
| 1930 | 407 | | — |
| 1940 | 438 | | 7.6% |
| 1950 | 466 | | 6.4% |
| 1960 | 520 | | 11.6% |
| 1970 | 586 | | 12.7% |
| 1980 | 489 | | −16.6% |
| 1990 | 440 | | −10.0% |
| 2000 | 484 | | 10.0% |
| 2010 | 404 | | −16.5% |
| 2020 | 494 | | 22.3% |
U.S. Decennial Census

=== Racial and ethnic composition ===
Hewlett Bay Park village, New York – Racial and ethnic composition Note: the US Census treats Hispanic/Latino as an ethnic category. This table excludes Latinos from the racial categories and assigns them to a separate category. Hispanics/Latinos may be of any race.
| Race / Ethnicity (NH = Non-Hispanic) | Pop 2000 | Pop 2010 | Pop 2020 | % 2000 | % 2010 | % 2020 |
|---|---|---|---|---|---|---|
| White alone (NH) | 429 | 356 | 400 | 88.64% | 88.12% | 80.97% |
| Black or African American alone (NH) | 7 | 0 | 7 | 1.45% | 0.00% | 1.42% |
| Native American or Alaska Native alone (NH) | 0 | 0 | 2 | 0.00% | 0.00% | 0.40% |
| Asian alone (NH) | 19 | 23 | 40 | 3.93% | 5.69% | 8.10% |
| Native Hawaiian or Pacific Islander alone (NH) | 0 | 0 | 0 | 0.00% | 0.00% | 0.00% |
| Other race alone (NH) | 1 | 2 | 2 | 0.21% | 0.50% | 0.40% |
| Mixed race or Multiracial (NH) | 5 | 1 | 23 | 1.03% | 0.25% | 4.66% |
| Hispanic or Latino (any race) | 23 | 22 | 20 | 4.75% | 5.45% | 4.05% |
| Total | 484 | 404 | 494 | 100.00% | 100.00% | 100.00% |

=== 2000 census ===
As of the census of 2000, there were 484 people, 157 households, and 138 families residing in the village. The population density was 1,381.6 inhabitants per square mile (533.4/km^{2}). There were 163 housing units at an average density of 465.3 per square mile (179.7/km^{2}). The racial makeup of the village was 91.32% White, 1.45% African American, 3.93% Asian, 1.86% from other races, and 1.45% from two or more races. Hispanic or Latino of any race were 4.75% of the population.

There were 157 households, out of which 34.4% had children under the age of 18 living with them, 82.8% were married couples living together, 2.5% had a female householder with no husband present, and 11.5% were non-families. 8.9% of all households were made up of individuals, and 5.7% had someone living alone who was 65 years of age or older. The average household size was 3.08 and the average family size was 3.23.

In the village, the population was spread out, with 26.0% under the age of 18, 6.2% from 18 to 24, 19.0% from 25 to 44, 28.3% from 45 to 64, and 20.5% who were 65 years of age or older. The median age was 44 years. For every 100 females, there were 92.8 males. For every 100 females age 18 and over, there were 93.5 males.

The median income for a household in the village was in excess of $200,000, as is the median income for a family. Males had a median income of over $100,000 versus $43,333 for females. The per capita income for the village was $113,320. About 1.5% of families and 4.8% of the population were below the poverty line, including 11.0% of those under age 18 and none of those age 65 or over.

== Government ==
As of May 2025, the Mayor of Hewlett Bay Park is Antonio Oliviero and the Village Trustees are Joshua Blisko, Michael Davidov, Steven Wilkowski and Renee Zylberberg.

== Education ==
=== Public schools ===
Children who reside within the village and attend public schools go to school in the Hewlet–Woodmere Union Free School District (Union Free School District 14). George W. Hewlett High School is the only high school in the district, and is located within the village, at its northwestern corner.

=== Private schools ===
Hewlett Bay Park is home to the Stella K. Abraham High School for Girls, a Jewish yeshiva high school which opened in 1992.
