= Hewlett Neck, New York =

- Village
- Incorporated Village of Hewlett Neck
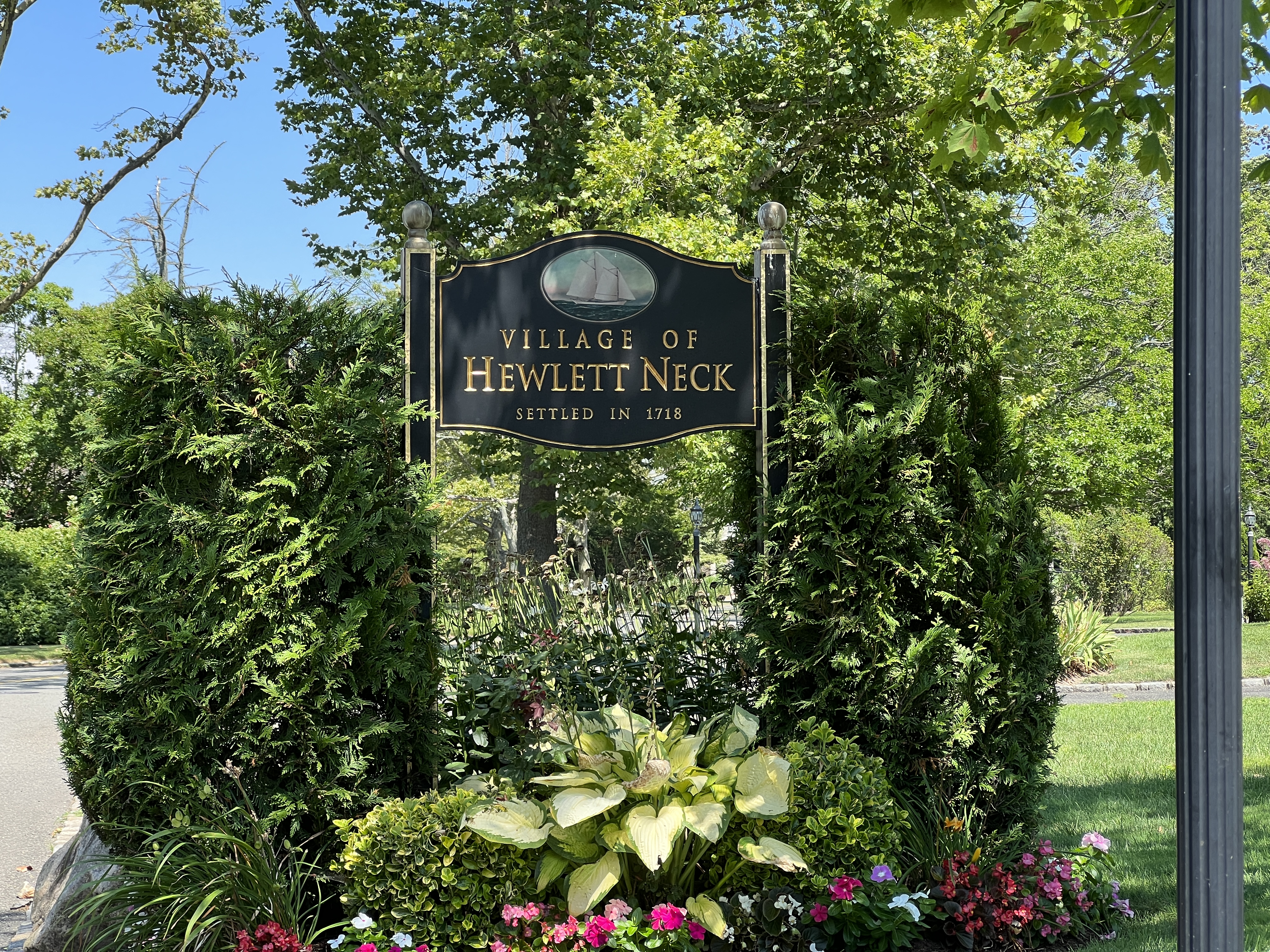
- A Hewlett Neck village welcome sign in 2022

- Location in Nassau County and the state of New York

- Location on Long Island Location within the state of New York
- Coordinates: 40°37′23″N 73°41′49″W
- Country: United States
- State: New York
- County: Nassau
- Town: Hempstead
- Incorporated: April 14, 1927

Area
  - Total: 0.21 sq mi (0.55 km^{2})
  - Land: 0.20 sq mi (0.51 km^{2})
  - Water: 0.019 sq mi (0.05 km^{2})
- Elevation: 6.6 ft (2 m)

Population (2020)
  - Total: 569
  - Density: 2,911.1/sq mi (1,123.97/km^{2})
- Time zone: UTC-5 (Eastern (EST))
  - Summer (DST): UTC-4 (EDT)
- ZIP Code: 11598 (Woodmere)
- Area codes: 516, 363
- FIPS code: 36-34319
- GNIS feature ID: 0952663
- Website: hewlettneck.org

Hewlett Neck is a village located within the Town of Hempstead in Nassau County, on the South Shore of Long Island, in New York, United States. The population was 569 at the time of the 2020 census.

The Incorporated Village of Hewlett Neck is included in the Five Towns, which is usually said to comprise the villages of Lawrence and Cedarhurst, as well as the hamlets of Woodmere, Inwood, and "The Hewletts," which consist of the villages of Hewlett Bay Park, Hewlett Harbor, Hewlett Neck, and Woodsburgh, and the unincorporated hamlet of Hewlett.

== History ==
Hewlett Neck was incorporated as a village on April 14, 1927.

Hewlett Neck consists of many large homes, mansions, villas and former plantations with very large property – a few dating back to the time of the American Revolution. The area, much like Back/Old Lawrence, is unique because its rural affluence is similar in character to the more well known Gold Coast of the North Shore instead of being more urbanized like the rest of the South Shore of Nassau County.

== Geography ==
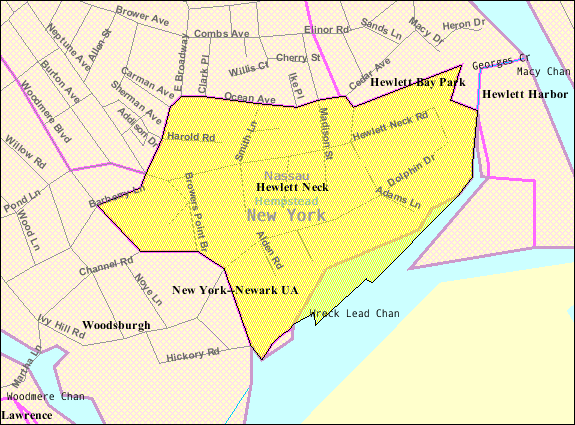
U.S. Census map of Hewlett Neck

According to the United States Census Bureau, the village has a total area of 0.2 square miles (0.52 km^{2}), of which 0.2 square miles (0.52 km^{2}) is land and 4.35% is water.

== Demographics ==
Historical population
Census	Pop.	Note	%±
1930	253		—
1940	252		−0.4%
1950	369		46.4%
1960	507		37.4%
1970	529		4.3%
1980	472		−10.8%
1990	547		15.9%
2000	504		−7.9%
2010	445		−11.7%
2020	569		27.9%
U.S. Decennial Census

=== Racial and ethnic composition ===
Hewlett Neck village, New York – Racial and ethnic composition Note: the US Census treats Hispanic/Latino as an ethnic category. This table excludes Latinos from the racial categories and assigns them to a separate category. Hispanics/Latinos may be of any race.
Race / Ethnicity (NH = Non-Hispanic)	Pop 2000	Pop 2010	Pop 2020	% 2000	% 2010	% 2020
White alone (NH)	493	407	491	97.82%	91.46%	86.29%
Black or African American alone (NH)	4	17	12	0.79%	3.82%	2.11%
Native American or Alaska Native alone (NH)	0	0	5	0.00%	0.00%	0.88%
Asian alone (NH)	1	9	22	0.20%	2.02%	3.87%
Native Hawaiian or Pacific Islander alone (NH)	0	0	0	0.00%	0.00%	0.00%
Other race alone (NH)	1	0	3	0.20%	0.00%	0.53%
Mixed race or Multiracial (NH)	0	3	6	0.00%	0.67%	1.05%
Hispanic or Latino (any race)	5	9	30	0.99%	2.02%	5.27%
Total	504	445	569	100.00%	100.00%	100.00%

=== 2000 census ===
As of the census of 2000, there were 504 people, 155 households, and 139 families residing in the village. The population density was 2,369.1 inhabitants per square mile (914.7/km^{2}). There were 163 housing units at an average density of 766.2 per square mile (295.8/km^{2}). The racial makeup of the village was 98.81% White, 0.79% African American, 0.20% Asian, 0.20% from other races. Hispanic or Latino of any race were 0.99% of the population.

There were 155 households, out of which 51.0% had children under the age of 18 living with them, 85.2% were married couples living together, 1.9% had a female householder with no husband present, and 10.3% were non-families. 8.4% of all households were made up of individuals, and 6.5% had someone living alone who was 65 years of age or older. The average household size was 3.25 and the average family size was 3.39.

In the village, the population was spread out, with 33.1% under the age of 18, 5.8% from 18 to 24, 21.8% from 25 to 44, 26.0% from 45 to 64, and 13.3% who were 65 years of age or older. The median age was 39 years. For every 100 females, there were 100.0 males. For every 100 females age 18 and over, there were 95.9 males.

The median income for a household in the village was $171,612, and the median income for a family was $181,530. Males had a median income of $100,000 versus $48,333 for females. The per capita income for the village was $88,049. None of the families and 1.2% of the population were living below the poverty line, including no under eighteens and 5.4% of those over 64.

== Government ==
As of September 2025, the Mayor of Hewlett Neck is Moshe Blinder, the Deputy Mayor is Isaac Showman, and the Village Trustees are Ariella Gasner, Isaac Showman, Edward Vilinsky, Russel Weinrib.

=== Politics ===
In the 2024 United States presidential election, the majority of Hewlett Neck voters voted for Donald Trump (R).

== Education ==
=== School district ===
The Village of Hewlett Neck is located entirely within the boundaries of (and is thus served by) the Hewlett–Woodmere Union Free School District. Accordingly, all children who reside within the village and attend public schools go to Hewlett–Woodmere's schools.

=== Library district ===
The Village of Hewlett Neck is located entirely within the boundaries of (and is thus served by) the Hewlett–Woodmere Library District, which is served by the Hewlett–Woodmere Public Library in the hamlet of Hewlett.

== Infrastructure ==
=== Transportation ===
==== Road ====
Major roads either partially or wholly within the village include Browers Point Branch (CR C25) and Woodmere Boulevard (CR E68).

==== Rail ====
No rail service passes through Hewlett Neck. The nearest Long Island Rail Road stations to the village are Hewlett and Woodmere on the Far Rockaway Branch.

==== Bus ====
No bus routes pass through the village.

=== Utilities ===
==== Natural gas ====
National Grid USA provides natural gas to homes and businesses that are hooked up to natural gas lines in Hewlett Neck.

==== Power ====
PSEG Long Island provides power to all homes and businesses within Hewlett Neck, on behalf of the Long Island Power Authority.

==== Sewage ====
Hewlett Neck, in its entirety, is served by the Nassau County Sewage District's sanitary sewer network.

==== Trash collection ====
Trash collection services in Hewlett Neck are provided by the Town of Hempstead's Sanitation District 1.

==== Water ====
The water supply in Hewlett Neck is provided by New York American Water.

== See also ==
- List of municipalities in New York
- Hewlett Bay Park, New York
- Hewlett Harbor, New York
- Woodsburgh, New York
