= Hewlett Harbor, New York =

- Village
- Incorporated Village of Hewlett Harbor
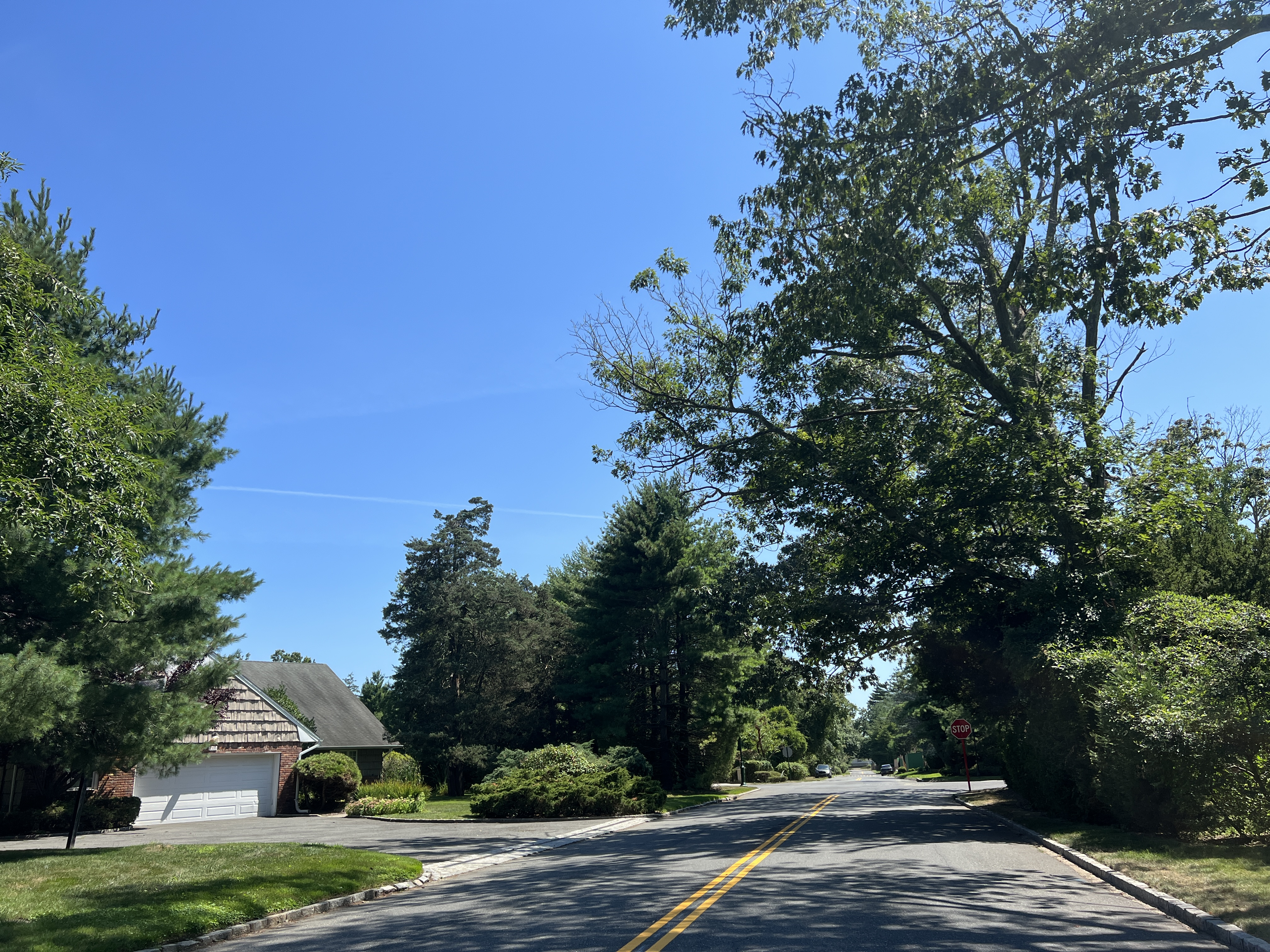
- Auerbach Avenue within Hewlett Harbor in 2022

- Seal
- Motto: "Simply a Great Place to Live"
- Location in Nassau County and the state of New York

- Location on Long Island Location within the state of New York
- Coordinates: 40°38′6″N 73°40′58″W
- Country: United States
- State: New York
- County: Nassau
- Town: Hempstead
- Incorporated: 1925

Government
  - Mayor: Dominic Calandrella

Area
  - Total: 0.83 sq mi (2.15 km^{2})
  - Land: 0.73 sq mi (1.88 km^{2})
  - Water: 0.10 sq mi (0.27 km^{2})
- Elevation: 9.8 ft (3 m)

Population (2020)
  - Total: 1,290
  - Density: 1,779.8/sq mi (687.19/km^{2})
- Time zone: UTC-5 (Eastern (EST))
  - Summer (DST): UTC-4 (EDT)
- ZIP Code: 11557 (Hewlett)
- Area codes: 516, 363
- FIPS code: 36-34308
- GNIS feature ID: 0970203
- Website: hewlettharbor.gov

Hewlett Harbor is a village in the Town of Hempstead in Nassau County, on Long Island, in New York, United States. The population was 1,290 at the time of the 2020 census.

The Village of Hewlett Harbor is considered part of the Greater Hewlett area, which is anchored by Hewlett – and it is located within the region of Long Island known as the Five Towns. This area, like Back/Old Lawrence is unique because its rural affluence is similar in character to the more well-known Gold Coast of the North Shore instead of being more urbanized like the rest of the South Shore of Nassau County.

== History ==
Prominent attorney Joseph Auerbach (for whom Auerbach Avenue is named) purchased large amounts of land in what would eventually become Hewlett Harbor in 1914. Auerbach, on this land, soon erected a summer home, in addition to what would become the Seawane Country Club.

Following Auerbach's sale of the country club in the 1920s, the new owners had large amounts of the club's excess land developed, with the land being subdivided and zoned for single-family residential homes.

In 1925, Hewlett Harbor incorporated as a village.

== Geography ==
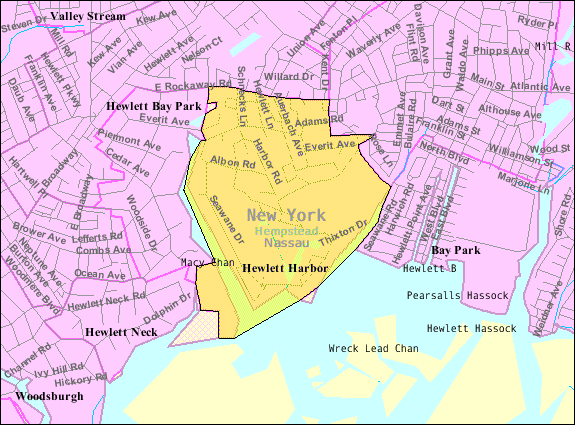
U.S. Census map of Hewlett Harbor

According to the United States Census Bureau, the village has a total area of 0.8 square miles (2.1 km^{2}), of which 0.7 square miles (1.8 km^{2}) is land and 0.1 square miles (0.26 km^{2}), or 10.98%, is water.

=== Climate ===
Under the Köppen climate classification, Hewlett Harbor features a humid subtropical climate (Cfa), bordering on a hot-summer humid continental climate (Dfa). Accordingly, summers are usually hot and humid with occasional thunderstorms, winters are usually cool with snow and rain, and the spring and fall typically feature mild weather.

== Demographics ==
Historical population
Census	Pop.	Note	%±
1930	240		—
1940	228		−5.0%
1950	411		80.3%
1960	1,610		291.7%
1970	1,512		−6.1%
1980	1,331		−12.0%
1990	1,193		−10.4%
2000	1,271		6.5%
2010	1,263		−0.6%
2020	1,290		2.1%
U.S. Decennial Census

=== Racial and ethnic composition ===
Hewlett Harbor village, New York – Racial and ethnic composition Note: the US Census treats Hispanic/Latino as an ethnic category. This table excludes Latinos from the racial categories and assigns them to a separate category. Hispanics/Latinos may be of any race.
Race / Ethnicity (NH = Non-Hispanic)	Pop 2000	Pop 2010	Pop 2020	% 2000	% 2010	% 2020
White alone (NH)	1,202	1,160	1,124	94.57%	91.84%	87.13%
Black or African American alone (NH)	5	10	13	0.39%	0.79%	1.01%
Native American or Alaska Native alone (NH)	2	0	3	0.16%	0.00%	0.23%
Asian alone (NH)	40	49	59	3.15%	3.88%	4.57%
Native Hawaiian or Pacific Islander alone (NH)	0	0	0	0.00%	0.00%	0.00%
Other race alone (NH)	3	11	2	0.24%	0.87%	0.16%
Mixed race or Multiracial (NH)	5	3	30	0.39%	0.24%	2.33%
Hispanic or Latino (any race)	14	30	59	1.10%	2.38%	4.57%
Total	1,271	1,263	1,290	100.00%	100.00%	100.00%

=== 2000 census ===
As of the census of 2000, there were 1,271 people, 429 households, and 380 families residing in the village. The population density was 1,754.3 inhabitants per square mile (677.3/km^{2}). There were 437 housing units at an average density of 603.2 per square mile (232.9/km^{2}). The racial makeup of the village was 95.12% White, 0.39% African American, 0.16% Native American, 3.15% Asian, 0.63% from other races, and 0.55% from two or more races. Hispanic or Latino of any race were 1.10% of the population.

There were 429 households, out of which 39.6% had children under the age of 18 living with them, 84.4% were married couples living together, 2.8% had a female householder with no husband present, and 11.4% were non-families. 10.0% of all households were made up of individuals, and 8.4% had someone living alone who was 65 years of age or older. The average household size was 2.96 and the average family size was 3.16.

In the village, the population was spread out, with 29.3% under the age of 18, 3.8% from 18 to 24, 19.8% from 25 to 44, 28.7% from 45 to 64, and 18.3% who were 65 years of age or older. The median age was 43 years. For every 100 females, there were 90.8 males. For every 100 females age 18 and over, there were 90.7 males.

The median income for a household in the village was $159,682, and the median income for a family was $185,962. Males had a median income of $100,000 versus $40,000 for females. The per capita income for the village was $82,069. None of the families and 0.7% of the population were living below the poverty line, including no under eighteens and 0.9% of those over 64.

== Government ==
=== Village government ===
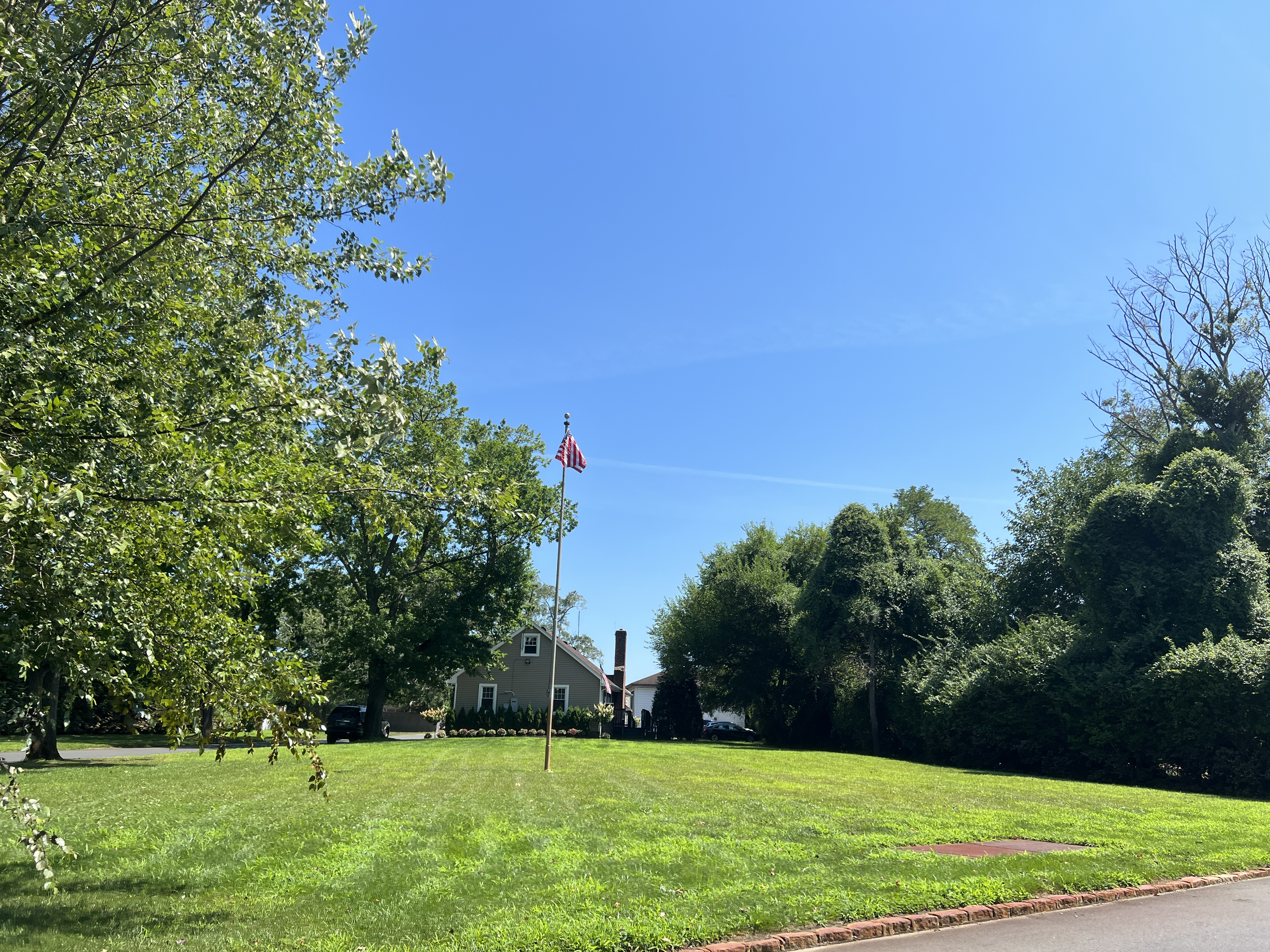
Hewlett Harbor Village Hall in 2022

As of July 2025, the Mayor of Hewlett Harbor is Dominic Calandrella, the Deputy Mayor is Gil Bruh and the Trustees are Hamza Akram, Igor Noble and Lorie Rudister.

=== Representation in higher government ===
==== Town representation ====
Hewlett Harbor is located in the Town of Hempstead's 4th Council District, which as of April 2024 is represented on the Hempstead Town Council by Laura A. Ryder (R–Lynbrook).

==== County representation ====
Hewlett Harbor is located in Nassau County's 7th Legislative district, which as of April 2024 is represented in the Nassau County Legislature by Howard J. Kopel (R–Lawrence).

==== New York State representation ====
===== New York State Assembly =====
Hewlett Harbor is located in the New York's 20th State Assembly district, which as of April 2024 is represented in the New York State Assembly by Ari Brown (R–Cedarhurst).

===== New York State Senate =====
Hewlett Harbor is located in the New York's 9th State Senate district, which as of April 2024 is represented in the New York State Senate by Patricia Canzoneri-Fitzpatrick (R–Malverne)

==== Federal representation ====
===== United States Congress =====
Hewlett Harbor is located in New York's 4th Congressional District, which as of April 2024 is represented in the United States Congress by Anthony D'Esposito (R–Island Park).

===== United States Senate =====
Like the rest of New York, Hewlett Harbor is represented in the United States Senate by Charles Schumer (D) and Kirsten Gillibrand (D).

== Education ==
=== School districts ===
The Village of Hewlett Harbor is primarily located within the boundaries of (and is thus served by) the Hewlett–Woodmere Union Free School District, while a smaller section is located within the boundaries of (and is thus served by) the Lynbrook Union Free School District. As such, children who reside within Hewlett Harbor and attend public schools go to school in one of these two districts, depending on where they reside within the village.

=== Library districts ===
Hewlett Harbor is located within the boundaries of (and is thus served by) the East Rockaway Library District and the Hewlett–Woodmere Library District. These two districts serve the areas of the village located within the Lynbrook Union Free School District and the Hewlett–Woodmere Union Free School District, respectively; the boundaries of these two districts roughly correspond with those of the Hewlett–Woodmere UFSD and Lynbrook UFSD within Hewlett Harbor.

== Infrastructure ==
=== Transportation ===
==== Road ====
Major roads either partially or wholly within the village include Auerbach Avenue, East Rockaway Road, Everit Avenue, Harbor Road, Pepperidge Road, and Seawane Drive.

Additionally, the village-maintained Mallow Reach Bridge is located entirely within the village, spanning Mallow Reach and the Auerbach Canal.

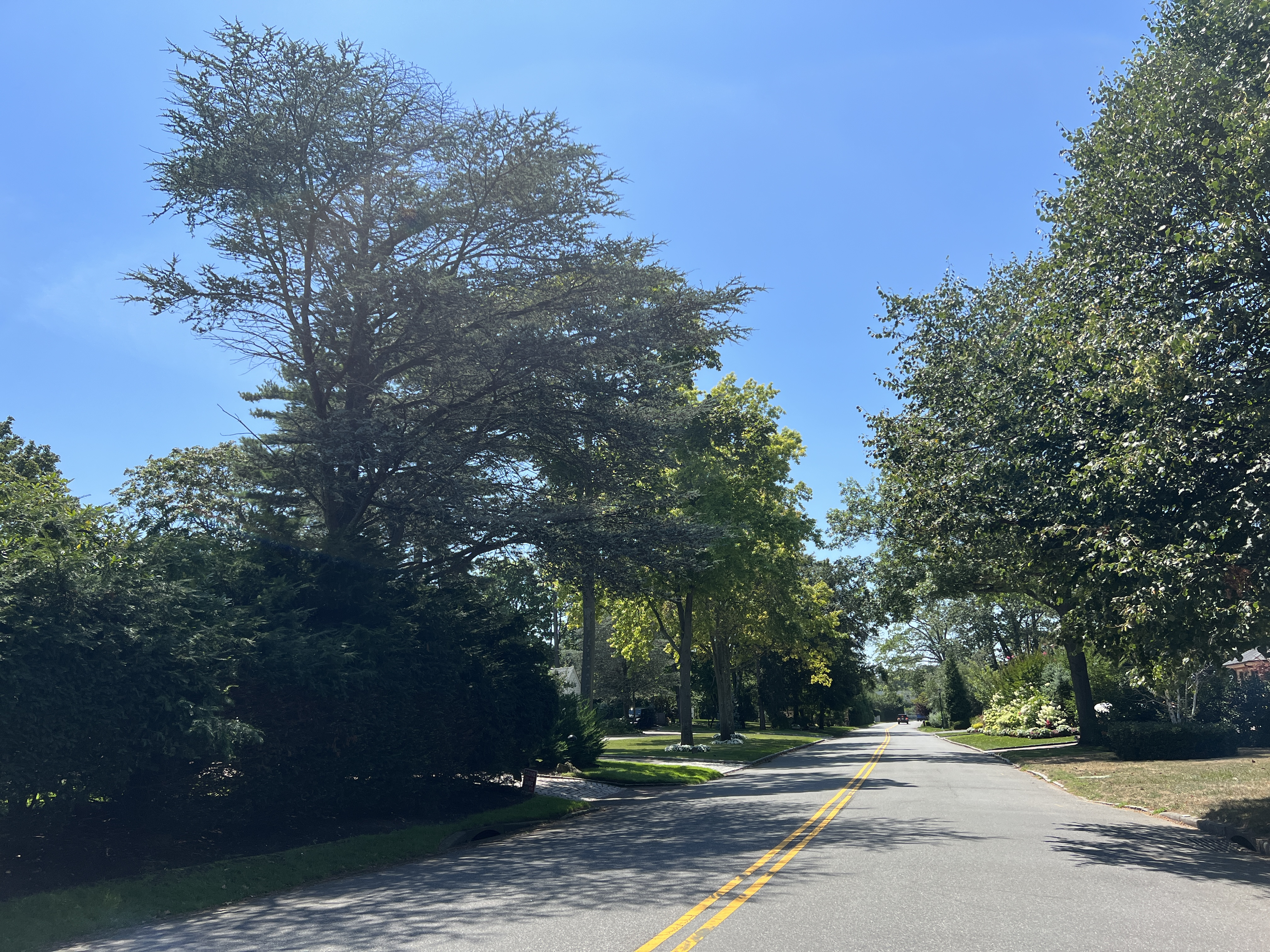
Everit Avenue in 2022

==== Rail ====
No rail service passes through Hewlett Harbor. The nearest Long Island Rail Road station to the village is Hewlett on the Far Rockaway Branch.

==== Bus ====
No bus routes pass through the village.

=== Utilities ===
==== Natural gas ====
National Grid USA provides natural gas to homes and businesses that are hooked up to natural gas lines in Hewlett Harbor.

==== Power ====
PSEG Long Island provides power to all homes and businesses within Hewlett Harbor, on behalf of the Long Island Power Authority.

==== Sewage ====
Hewlett Harbor, in its entirety, is served by the Nassau County Sewage District's sanitary sewer network.

==== Trash collection ====
Trash collection services in Hewlett Harbor are provided by the Town of Hempstead's Sanitation District 1.

==== Water ====
The water supply in Hewlett Harbor is provided by New York American Water.

== Notable residents ==
- Emily Austin (born 2001), activist, influencer, local government official, sports journalist, and writer.
- Maurice M. Black (1918-1996), pathologist who was an expert on breast cancer.
- Ross Bleckner (born 1949), artist.
- Robert DiBernardo (1937-1986), member of the Gambino crime family.
- Pamela Geller, political activist and author.
- Todd P. Haskell (born 1962), diplomat and career Foreign Service officer who served as the United States Ambassador to the Republic of the Congo
- Stan Lee (1922-2018), former Marvel Comics editor and creator.
- William Modell (1921–2008), chairman of the Modell's Sporting Goods retail chain.
- Errol Morris (born 1948), Oscar-winning film director, best known for documentaries.
- George H. Ross (born 1928), executive vice president and senior counsel of the Trump Organization; judge on the television program The Apprentice.
- Jim Steinman (1947-2021) Songwriter of hits including "Total Eclipse of the Heart" and Meat Loaf's "Bat Out of Hell".
- Jonathan Tiomkin (born 1979), Olympic foil fencer.

== In popular culture ==
The village of Hewlett Harbor was specifically mentioned by TV personality Johnny "Drama" Chase on HBO's Entourage on the Sunday, May 13, 2007, episode entitled "The Resurrection". On Entourage, Drama stars in a fictional NBC TV series called Five Towns. The series' name is a reference to the real "Five Towns", an informal grouping of villages and hamlets located on Long Island, New York's South Shore of western Nassau County. "The Hewletts" (Hewlett, Hewlett Harbor, Hewlett Bay Park, and Hewlett Neck) are generally grouped together as one of the "Five Towns," with the other four being Woodmere, Cedarhurst, Lawrence, and Inwood, along with Woodsburgh. The fictional Five Towns series is produced by actor/screenwriter/producer Ed Burns (who plays himself on Entourage), who grew up in the Hewlett area and attended George W. Hewlett High School.

On the episode aired on April 13, it was said that the Village of Hewlett Harbor was the setting of the fictional NBC TV series called Five Towns.

== See also ==
- List of municipalities in New York
- Seawane Country Club
