= Woodsburgh, New York =

- Village
- Incorporated Village of Woodsburgh
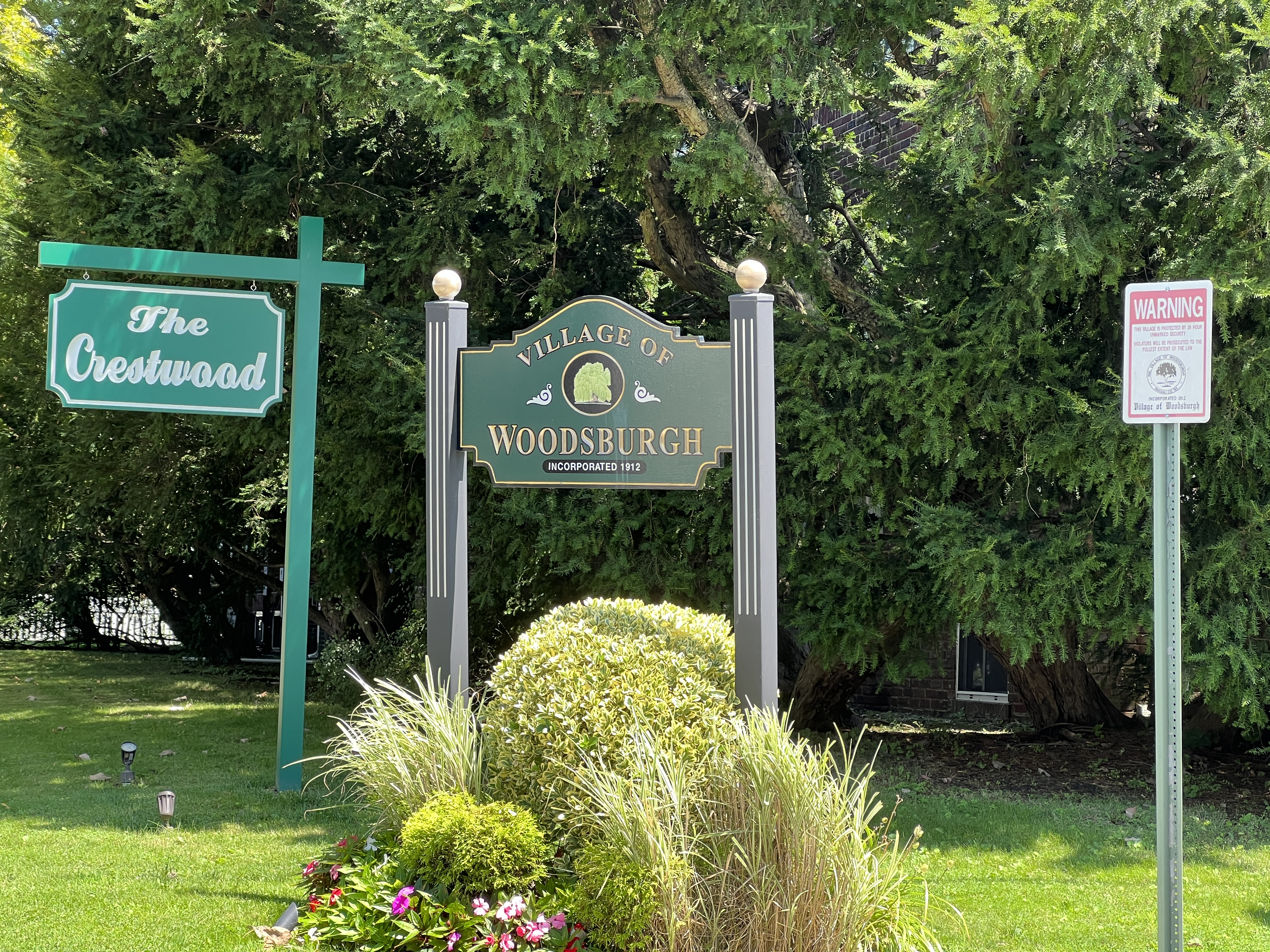
- A Woodsburgh welcome sign in 2022

- Location in Nassau County and the state of New York

- Location on Long Island Location within the state of New York
- Coordinates: 40°37′20″N 73°42′26″W
- Country: United States
- State: New York
- County: Nassau
- Town: Hempstead
- Incorporated: 1912
- Named for: Samuel Wood

Government
  - Mayor: Jacob Harman
  - Deputy Mayor: Alam Hirmes

Area
  - Total: 0.38 sq mi (0.99 km^{2})
  - Land: 0.34 sq mi (0.88 km^{2})
  - Water: 0.042 sq mi (0.11 km^{2})
- Elevation: 6.6 ft (2 m)

Population (2020)
  - Total: 897
  - Density: 2,650.3/sq mi (1,023.29/km^{2})
- Time zone: UTC-5 (Eastern (EST))
  - Summer (DST): UTC-4 (EDT)
- ZIP code: 11598
- Area codes: 516, 363
- FIPS code: 36-82986
- GNIS feature ID: 0971715
- Website: woodsburgh.gov

Woodsburgh is a village located within the Town of Hempstead in Nassau County, on the South Shore of Long Island, in New York, United States. The population was 897 at the time of the 2020 census.

The Incorporated Village of Woodsburgh is included in the Five Towns (though not as one of the "five"), which is usually said to comprise the incorporated villages of Lawrence and Cedarhurst, the hamlets of Woodmere and Inwood, and the Hewletts (the incorporated villages of Hewlett Bay Park, Hewlett Harbor, and Hewlett Neck, and the unincorporated hamlet of Hewlett – along with the incorporated village of Woodsburgh).

== History ==
Woodsburgh is named for Samuel Wood – a local executive who established a resort community in the late 19th century, in what would ultimately become the Incorporated Village of Woodsburgh in the early 20th century. Wood – along with business partner Robert Burton – would spearhead the community's early development.

In 1912, Woodsburgh incorporated as a village, with the majority of residents who voted in the referendum on the matter opting to incorporate and gain home rule powers.

== Geography ==
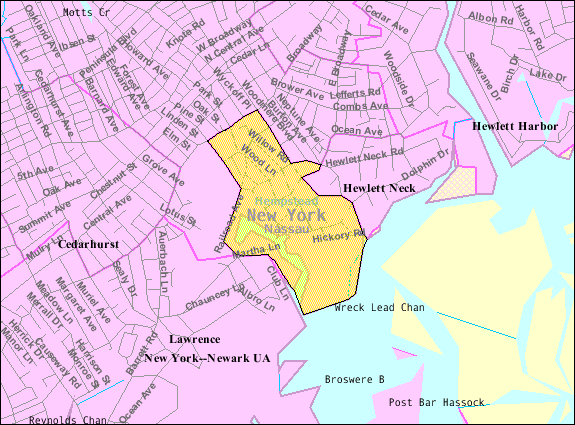
U.S. Census map of Woodsburgh

According to the United States Census Bureau, the village has a total area of 0.4 square miles (1.0 km^{2}), of which 0.4 square miles (1.0 km^{2}) is land and 0.04 square miles (0.10 km^{2}) – or 7.69% – is water.

The village is located between Hewlett and Woodmere and borders Brosewere Bay to the south.

== Demographics ==
=== 2020 census ===
As of 2020, the population of Woodsburgh was at 897 people with a median age of 50.9 years. In 2024, this population drops to 872 people with the male population being it 429 while the female population was 458. The median age was recorded to be at 50.9.

=== 2000 census ===
Historical population
Census	Pop.	Note	%±
1920	220		—
1930	376		70.9%
1940	702		86.7%
1950	745		6.1%
1960	907		21.7%
1970	817		−9.9%
1980	847		3.7%
1990	1,190		40.5%
2000	831		−30.2%
2010	778		−6.4%
2020	897		15.3%
U.S. Decennial Census

At the 2000 census, there were 831 people, 257 households and 224 families residing in the village. The population density was 2,286.7 inhabitants per square mile (882.9/km^{2}). There were 268 housing units at an average density of 737.5 per square mile (284.8/km^{2}). The racial makeup of the village was 98.44% White, 0.36% African American, 0.72% Asian, 0.36% from other races, and 0.12% from two or more races. Hispanic or Latino of any race were 2.17% of the population.

There were 257 households, of which 45.9% had children under the age of 18 living with them, 83.7% were married couples living together, 2.7% had a female householder with no husband present, and 12.8% were non-families. 12.1% of all households were made up of individuals, and 9.3% had someone living alone who was 65 years of age or older. The average household size was 3.23 and the average family size was 3.50.

33.1% of the population were under the age of 18, 5.9% from 18 to 24, 20.1% from 25 to 44, 28.3% from 45 to 64, and 12.6% who were 65 years of age or older. The median age was 41 years. For every 100 females, there were 99.3 males. For every 100 females age 18 and over, there were 91.1 males.

The median household income was $185,296 and the median family income was $189,227. Males had a median income of $100,000 compared with $60,833 for females. The per capita income for the village was $76,443. None of the families and 0.4% of the population were living below the poverty line, including no under eighteens and none of those over 64.

== Government ==
The Village of Woodsburgh is governed by the Village of Woodsburgh Board of Trustees, which consists of a mayor and four trustees – one of whom is appointed annually by the Mayor to serve as deputy mayor.

As of April 2026, the Mayor of Woodsburgh is Jacob Harman, the Deputy Mayor is Shira Hoschander, and the Village Trustees are Shimon Fishman, Barry Rozenberg, and Mario Alex Joseph.

Past Mayors include James A. McCrea (1912-1914), Frederick H. Hatch (1914-1926), Charles A. Marshall (1926-1931), John H. Ballantine (1931-1937), Newbold L. Herrick (1937-1943), Sidney O. Crystal (1943-1952), Arthur D. Marks (1952-1959), Spencer B. Witty (1959-1969), Donald S. Ruth (1969-1975), Stephen S. Mukamal (1975-1978), Jesse Halperin (1978-1987), Julius Dintenfass (1987-1989), Jack L. Libert (1989-July 1994), Susan L. Schlaff (1994-2011), and Lee Israel (2012-2022).

Past Trustees include Carl Cayne, Garry Goffner, Alan Hirmes, David Perl, and Barry Platnick.

=== Politics ===
In the 2024 United States presidential election, the majority of Woodsburgh voters voted for Donald Trump (R).

== Education ==
=== School districts ===
The Incorporated Village of Woodsburgh is located within the boundaries of (and is thus served by) the Hewlett-Woodmere Union Free School District in one part and the Lawrence Union Free School District in another part; geographically, the total area covered by each district within the village is roughly even. Accordingly, children who reside within Woodsburgh and attend public schools go to school in one of these two districts, depending on where they reside within the village.

=== Library districts ===
Woodsburgh is located within the boundaries of (and is thus served by) the Peninsula Library District and the Hewlett-Woodmere Library District. These two districts serve the areas of the village located within the Lawrence Union Free School District and the Hewlett-Woodmere Union Free School District, respectively; the boundaries of these two districts roughly correspond with those of the two school districts within Woodsburgh.

== Notable people ==
- William Fox – Producer; founder of the Fox Film Corporation.
- Henry Ziegler Steinway – Businessman and former president of Steinway & Sons.

== See also ==
- List of municipalities in New York
- Hewlett, New York
- Hewlett Bay Park, New York
- Hewlett Neck, New York
- Hewlett Harbor, New York
- Woodmere, New York
