= Hewlett, New York =

Hamlet and census-designated place in US

- Hamlet and census-designated place
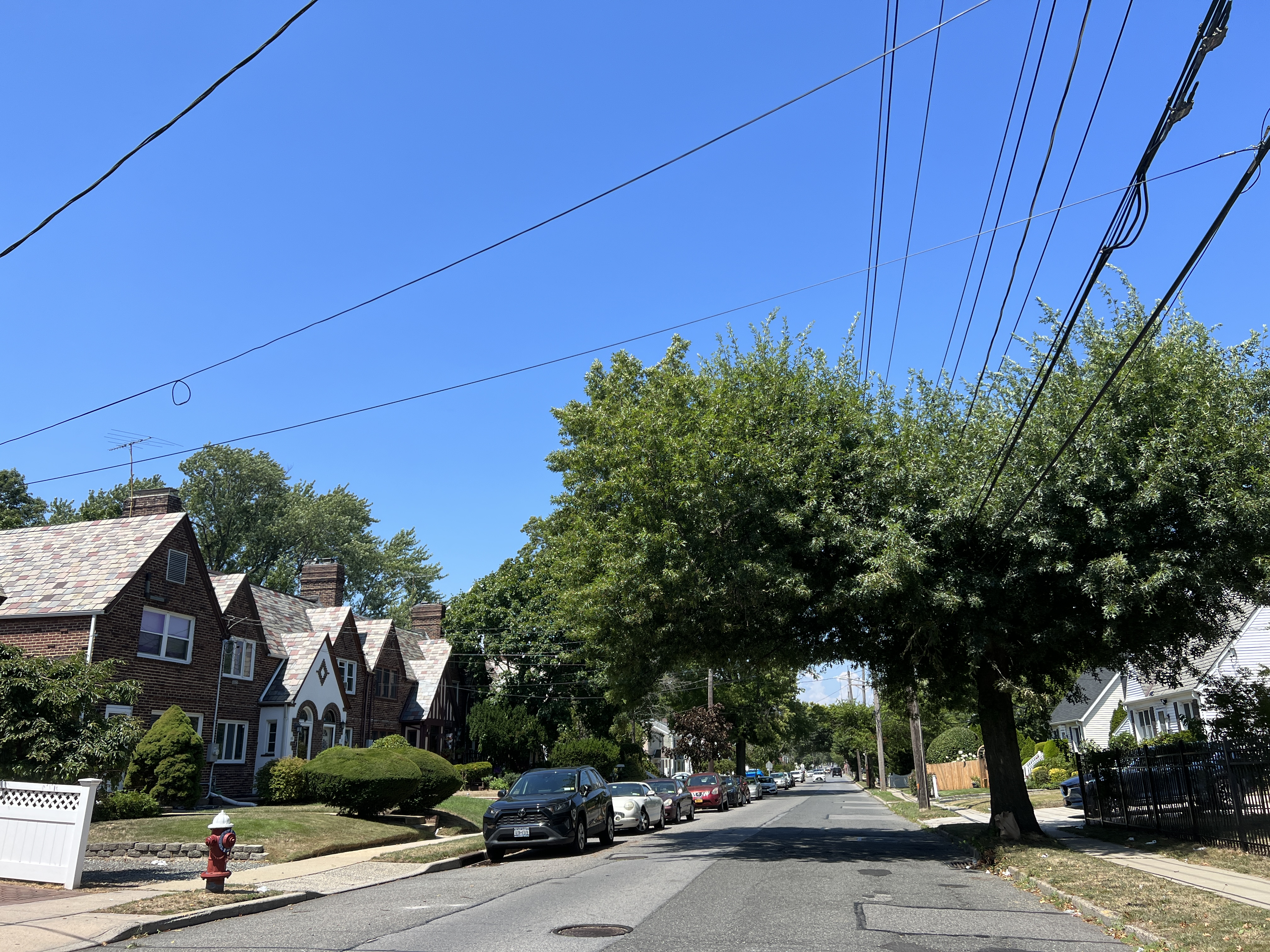
- Harris Avenue in Hewlett in 2022

- Location in Nassau County and the state of New York

- Location on Long Island Location within the state of New York
- Coordinates: 40°38′31″N 73°41′39″W
- Country: United States
- State: New York
- County: Nassau
- Town: Hempstead
- Named for: The Hewlett family

Area
  - Total: 0.90 sq mi (2.33 km^{2})
  - Land: 0.88 sq mi (2.28 km^{2})
  - Water: 0.019 sq mi (0.05 km^{2})
- Elevation: 20 ft (6 m)

Population (2020)
  - Total: 7,262
  - Density: 8,246.5/sq mi (3,184.01/km^{2})
- Time zone: UTC-5 (Eastern (EST))
  - Summer (DST): UTC-4 (EDT)
- ZIP Codes: 11557 (Hewlett); 11563 (Lynbrook); 11598 (Woodmere)
- Area codes: 516, 363
- FIPS code: 36-34286
- GNIS feature ID: 0952660

Hewlett is a hamlet and census-designated place (CDP) located within the Town of Hempstead in Nassau County, on Long Island, in New York, United States. The population was 7,262 at the time of the 2020 census.

Hewlett is usually included as one of the Five Towns in the southwestern corner of Nassau County. In the context of the Five Towns, "The Hewletts" or "Hewlett" is often used to refer collectively to the hamlet of Hewlett, together with the villages of Hewlett Bay Park, Hewlett Harbor and Hewlett Neck, along with Woodsburgh.

== History ==
The hamlet's name comes from the Hewlett family. George Hewlett, the first Hewlett to settle in the area, was born in England in 1634. He was part of an English community which emigrated to Long Island - by way of Connecticut - and negotiated treaties with the Dutch governors and native inhabitants to establish a population center in what is now Hempstead.

== Geography ==
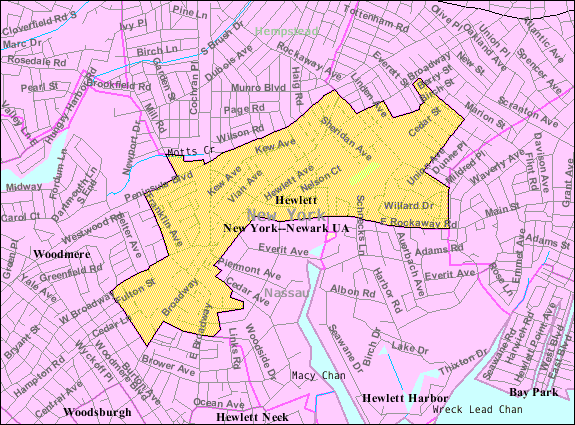
U.S. Census map of Hewlett

According to the United States Census Bureau, the CDP has a total area of 0.9 square miles (2.3 km^{2}), of which 0.9 square miles (2.3 km^{2}) is land and 1.11% is water.

== Demographics ==
Historical population
Census	Pop.	Note	%±
2010	6,819		—
2020	7,262		6.5%
U.S. Decennial Census

=== 2020 census ===
As of the 2020 census, Hewlett had a population of 7,262. The median age was 41.9 years. 23.1% of residents were under the age of 18 and 19.5% of residents were 65 years of age or older. For every 100 females there were 94.4 males, and for every 100 females age 18 and over there were 90.3 males age 18 and over.

100.0% of residents lived in urban areas, while 0.0% lived in rural areas.

There were 2,532 households in Hewlett, of which 35.2% had children under the age of 18 living in them. Of all households, 58.3% were married-couple households, 12.4% were households with a male householder and no spouse or partner present, and 25.9% were households with a female householder and no spouse or partner present. About 22.6% of all households were made up of individuals and 13.5% had someone living alone who was 65 years of age or older.

There were 2,698 housing units, of which 6.2% were vacant. The homeowner vacancy rate was 1.9% and the rental vacancy rate was 4.2%.

Racial composition as of the 2020 census
Race	Number	Percent
White	5,213	71.8%
Black or African American	322	4.4%
American Indian and Alaska Native	24	0.3%
Asian	630	8.7%
Native Hawaiian and Other Pacific Islander	1	0.0%
Some other race	542	7.5%
Two or more races	530	7.3%
Hispanic or Latino (of any race)	1,086	15.0%

=== Demographic estimates ===
As of the census of 2024, there were 7,590 people, 2,547 households, and 1,833 families residing in the CDP. The population density was 7,936.0 inhabitants per square mile (3,064.1/km^{2}). There were 2,708 housing units at an average density of 3,074.4 per square mile (1,187.0/km^{2}). The racial makeup of the CDP was 86.2% White, 2.8% African American, 0.2% Native American, 7.8% Asian, 0.1% Pacific Islander, 4.6% from other races, and 1.6% from two or more races. Hispanic or Latino of any race were 10.67% of the population.

There were 2,634 households, out of which 33.4% had children under the age of 18 living with them, 62.9% were married couples living together, 9.0% had a female householder with no husband present, and 24.8% were non-families. 22.1% of all households were made up of individuals, and 10.5% had someone living alone who was 65 years of age or older. The average household size was 2.67 and the average family size was 10.7.

The median age was 44.2 years. Females comprised 52% of the population, and males comprised 48% of the population

=== Income and poverty ===
The median income for a household in the CDP was $66,550, and the median income for a family was $74,259. Males had a median income of $51,977 versus $40,750 for females. The per capita income for the CDP was $38,803. 2.9% of the population and 1.3% of families were below the poverty line. Out of the total people living in poverty, 2.8% were under the age of 18 and 5.9% were 65 or older.

== Transportation ==
The Hewlett station on the Long Island Rail Road's Far Rockaway Branch is located within the hamlet.

Nassau Inter-County Express (NICE) serves Hewlett with the n1, n31, n31x, n32, Elmont Flexi bus routes – all of which travel through the hamlet.

== Education ==
=== Public education ===
Hewlett is primarily located within the boundaries of (and is thus served by) the Hewlett-Woodmere School District (District 14), although smaller portions of the hamlet are located within the boundaries of (and are thus served by) the Lynbrook Union Free School District. Accordingly, students who reside within Hewlett and attend public schools go to school in one of these districts depending on where they live within the hamlet.

=== Private education ===
The Yeshiva of South Shore is located in Hewlett.

== Notable people ==
- Deborah Asnis (1956–2015), Infectious disease specialist, who discovered and reported the first human cases of West Nile virus in the United States
- Jeffrey Bader – Former Senior Director for Asia, National Security Council, Obama Administration; US Ambassador to Namibia; and member, Hewlett-Woodmere High School Alumni Hall of Fame.
- Ross Bleckner – artist
- John P. Campo – Thoroughbred racehorse trainer
- Louise Glück – poet, essayist and 2020 Nobel Prize in Literature laureate
- Harvey Milk – politician and LGBT advocate, who taught at Hewlett High School
- Errol Morris – Film director
- Steven T. Ross (1937–2018), military historian
- Max Seibald – lacrosse player
- Jim Steinman – composer, lyricist, record producer and playwright
