= Cedarhurst, New York =

Village in New York, United States

- Village
- Incorporated Village of Cedarhurst
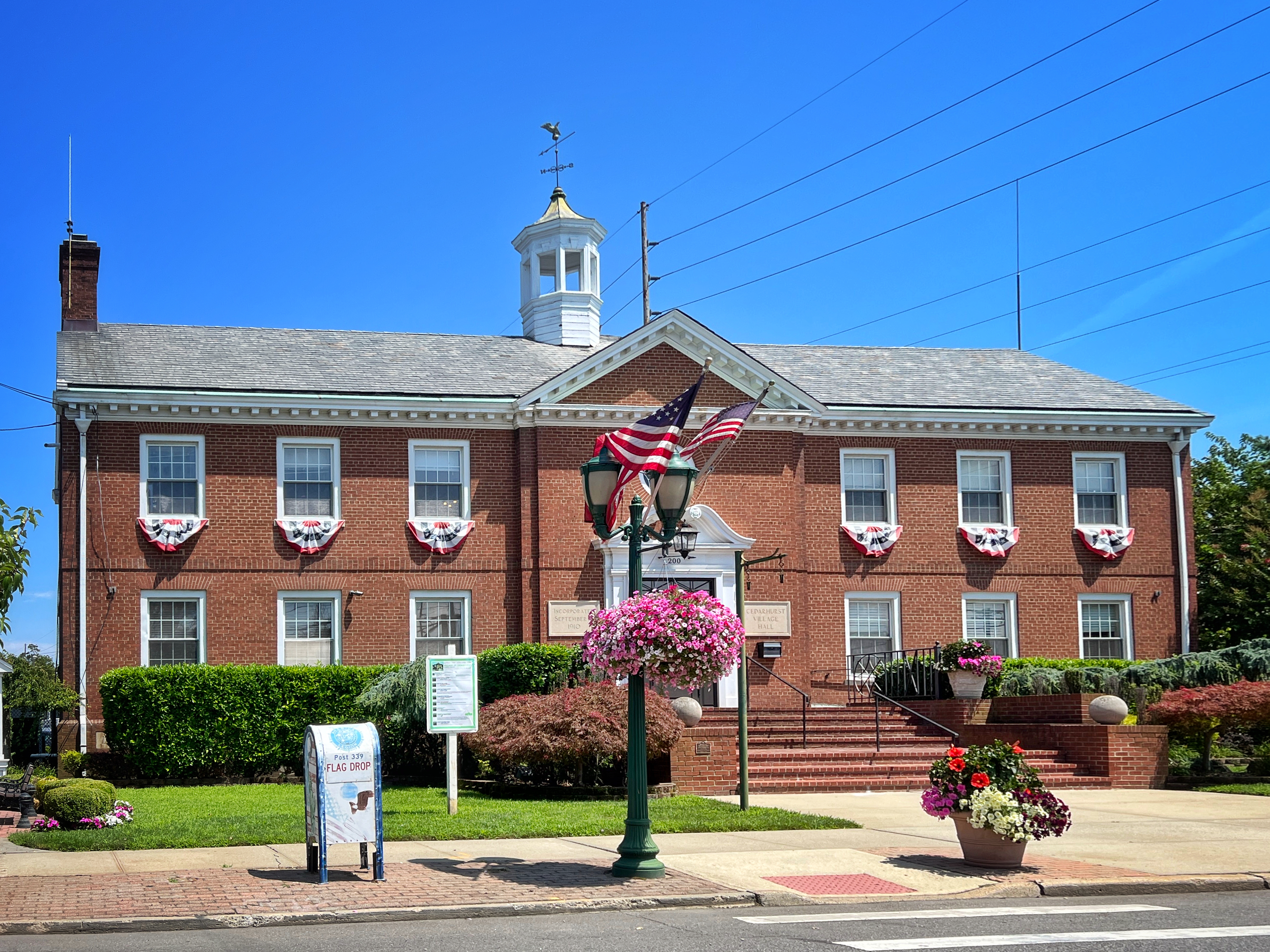
- Cedarhurst Village Hall in 2022

- Flag Seal
- Nickname: 5 Towns
- Motto: Cavendo Tutus
- Location in Nassau County and the state of New York

- Location on Long Island Location within the state of New York
- Coordinates: 40°37′33″N 73°43′42″W
- Country: United States
- State: New York
- County: Nassau
- Town: Hempstead
- Incorporated: 1910

Government
  - Mayor: Benjamin Weinstock
  - Deputy Mayor: Ari Brown
  - Trustee: Myrna Zisman
  - Trustee: Israel Wasser
  - Trustee: Daniel Plaut

Area
  - Total: 0.68 sq mi (1.75 km^{2})
  - Land: 0.68 sq mi (1.75 km^{2})
  - Water: 0 sq mi (0.00 km^{2})
- Elevation: 26 ft (8 m)

Population (2020)
  - Total: 7,374
  - Density: 10,927.8/sq mi (4,219.23/km^{2})
- Time zone: UTC−5 (Eastern (EST))
  - Summer (DST): UTC−4 (EDT)
- ZIP code: 11516
- Area codes: 516, 363
- FIPS code: 36-13233
- GNIS feature ID: 0946156
- Website: www.cedarhurst.gov

Cedarhurst (historically known as Ocean Point) is a village in the Town of Hempstead in Nassau County, on the South Shore of Long Island, in New York, United States. The population was 7,374 at the time of the 2020 census.

The Incorporated Village of Cedarhurst is located in the region of Long Island's South Shore known as the Five Towns.

== History ==
The village was incorporated in 1910. It is part of the "Five Towns," together with the village of Lawrence and the hamlets of Woodmere and Inwood, and "The Hewletts," which consist of the villages of Hewlett Bay Park, Hewlett Harbor and Hewlett Neck and the hamlet of Hewlett, along with Woodsburgh.

Cedarhurst's early name was Ocean Point. Rail service arrived in 1869 which led people to the area, especially to the Rockaway Hunting Club, built in Cedarhurst in 1878. A post office was established in 1884, and Ocean Point was renamed Cedarhurst, partly at the request of the Hunt Club. The name Cedarhurst is in reference to a grove of trees that once stood at the post office.

In 1959, the present Cedarhurst Village Hall was erected. This two-story building houses the village's government.

For many years, Central Avenue, the area's main business district, was considered the Rodeo Drive of Long Island, offering upscale shops and boutiques to shoppers from around the area. With the growth of the local Orthodox Jewish community, many stores and restaurants now cater to the needs of this community. As observant Jews do not shop on the Jewish Sabbath, many of the street's businesses are closed on Saturday, reducing the foot traffic for those stores that remain open on Saturdays.

On November 22, 2019, a fire broke out at the Cedarhurst Shoppes, which affected five businesses of various types and significantly damaged them.

== Geography ==
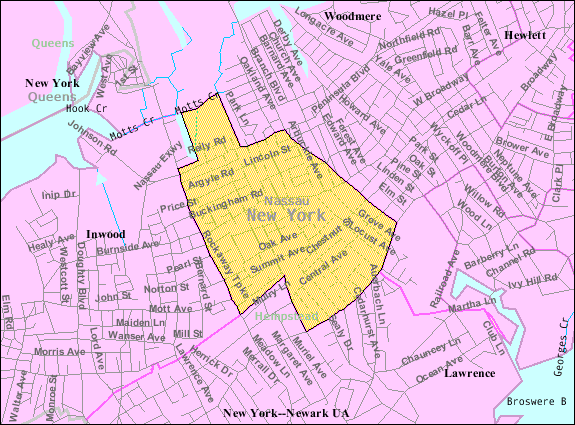
U.S. Census map of Cedarhurst

According to the United States Census Bureau, the village has a total area of 0.7 square miles (1.8 km^{2}), all land.

== Demographics ==
Historical population
Census	Pop.	Note	%±
1920	2,838		—
1930	5,065		78.5%
1940	5,463		7.9%
1950	6,051		10.8%
1960	6,954		14.9%
1970	6,941		−0.2%
1980	6,162		−11.2%
1990	5,716		−7.2%
2000	6,164		7.8%
2010	6,592		6.9%
2020	7,374		11.9%
U.S. Decennial Census

=== Racial and ethnic composition ===
Cedarhurst village, New York – Racial and ethnic composition Note: the US Census treats Hispanic/Latino as an ethnic category. This table excludes Latinos from the racial categories and assigns them to a separate category. Hispanics/Latinos may be of any race.
Race / Ethnicity (NH = Non-Hispanic)	Pop 2000	Pop 2010	Pop 2020	% 2000	% 2010	% 2020
White alone (NH)	5,294	5,423	5,803	85.89%	82.27%	78.70%
Black or African American alone (NH)	70	134	151	1.14%	2.03%	2.05%
Native American or Alaska Native alone (NH)	7	2	0	0.11%	0.03%	0.00%
Asian alone (NH)	190	236	189	3.08%	3.58%	2.56%
Native Hawaiian or Pacific Islander alone (NH)	0	0	0	0.00%	0.00%	0.00%
Other race alone (NH)	15	42	74	0.24%	0.64%	1.00%
Mixed race or Multiracial (NH)	73	50	117	1.18%	0.76%	1.59%
Hispanic or Latino (any race)	515	705	1,040	8.35%	10.69%	14.10%
Total	6,164	6,592	7,374	100.00%	100.00%	100.00%

=== 2020 census ===
As of the 2020 census, Cedarhurst had a population of 7,374. The median age was 32.3 years. 32.0% of residents were under the age of 18 and 15.5% of residents were 65 years of age or older. For every 100 females there were 97.2 males, and for every 100 females age 18 and over there were 94.1 males age 18 and over.

100.0% of residents lived in urban areas, while 0.0% lived in rural areas.

There were 2,265 households in Cedarhurst, of which 40.3% had children under the age of 18 living in them. Of all households, 57.3% were married-couple households, 16.0% were households with a male householder and no spouse or partner present, and 24.5% were households with a female householder and no spouse or partner present. About 23.4% of all households were made up of individuals and 13.4% had someone living alone who was 65 years of age or older.

There were 2,413 housing units, of which 6.1% were vacant. The homeowner vacancy rate was 1.4% and the rental vacancy rate was 2.9%.

=== 2000 census ===
As of the 2000 census, there were 6,164 people, 2,289 households, and 1,636 families residing in the village. The population density was 9,042.0 inhabitants per square mile (3,491.1/km^{2}). There were 2,366 housing units at an average density of 3,470.7 per square mile (1,340.0/km^{2}). The racial makeup of the village was 90.74% White, 1.28% African American, 0.11% Native American, 3.08% Asian, 2.94% from other races, and 1.85% from two or more races. Hispanic or Latino of any race were 8.35% of the population.

There were 2,289 households, out of which 31.5% had children under the age of 18 living with them, 59.1% were married couples living together, 9.2% had a female householder with no husband present, and 28.5% were non-families. 24.5% of all households were made up of individuals, and 13.6% had someone living alone who was 65 years of age or older. The average household size was 2.69 and the average family size was 3.25.

In the village, the population was spread out, with 25.1% under the age of 18, 6.3% from 18 to 24, 27.5% from 25 to 44, 24.0% from 45 to 64, and 17.2% who were 65 years of age or older. The median age was 39 years. For every 100 females, there were 91.0 males. For every 100 females age 18 and over, there were 85.6 males.

The median income for a household in the village was $56,441, and the median income for a family was $71,406. Males had a median income of $52,460 versus $37,292 for females. The per capita income for the village was $29,591. About 4.3% of families and 5.3% of the population were below the poverty line, including 7.3% of those under age 18 and 5.9% of those age 65 or over.

=== Demographic estimates ===
Over the past 20 years significant numbers of Orthodox Jewish families have moved into Cedarhurst supporting synagogues and other Jewish organizations. Italian-Americans (15.3%), Russian Americans (10.5%), Polish-Americans (9.7%) and Irish-Americans (6.9%) also make up a large percentage of the Five Towns community.

== Education ==
Cedarhurst is part of School District 15 and is served by the Lawrence Union Free School District. Lawrence High School as well as the No. 5 Elementary School – both of which serve students from a number of surrounding communities – are located within the Village of Cedarhurst.

Cedarhurst is also home to the Hebrew Academy of the Five Towns and Rockaway – a Jewish high school – and a Kahal school, both located on Central Avenue.

== Religion ==
Cedarhurst is home to a number of synagogues, including Temple Beth El, the Chofetz Chaim Torah Center, Congregation Tifereth Zvi, Kehilas Bais Yehuda Tzvi (otherwise known as The Red Shul), Agudath Israel of the Five Towns, Chabad of the Five Towns, Kehilas Bais Yisroel and the Young Israel of Lawrence Cedarhurst. The national Jewish Orthodox Women's Medical Association (JOWMA) is based in Cedarhurst.

The town is also home to St. Joachim Church of the Roman Catholic Diocese of Rockville Centre, also on Central Avenue. The church's parish elementary school was closed in June 2005 due to declining enrollment in the school's area over the previous decade.

== Government ==
As of September 2025, the Mayor of the Village of Cedarhurst, its Village Trustees, and its Village Justice are as follows:

- Mayor Benjamin Weinstock
- Deputy Mayor Ari Brown (2001–present)
- Village Trustee Myrna Zisman (2008–present)
- Village Trustee Israel Wasser (2015–present)
- Village Trustee Daniel Plaut (2019–present)
- Village Justice Andrew Goldsmith (2013–present)

== Transportation ==
=== Train ===
The Cedarhurst station provides Long Island Rail Road service on the Far Rockaway Branch to New York Penn Station and Grand Central Terminal in Midtown Manhattan, and to Atlantic Terminal in Brooklyn.

=== Bus ===
Cedarhurst is directly served by buses operated by Nassau Inter-County Express (NICE) and the Metropolitan Transportation Authority. NICE regularly services the neighborhood with the n31, n31x, and n32 buses. The MTA offers limited service with the Q111 bus, running only one trip a day in each direction.

== Emergency services ==
The Nassau County Police Department provides police services in Cedarhurst and most of Nassau County. Cedarhurst is part of the force's Fourth Precinct.

Cedarhurst is served by the Lawrence-Cedarhurst Fire Department. The LCFD consists of close to 80 volunteer firefighters and provides fire protection to the villages of Lawrence and Cedarhurst, as well as the North Lawrence Fire District and East Lawrence Fire District. The LCFD also responds to alarms such as car accidents and aided cases on the Atlantic Beach Bridge. The Chief of the Lawrence-Cedarhurst Fire Department is James McHugh.

They are also served by the volunteer EMS Hatzalah of the Rockaways and Nassau.

== Notable people ==
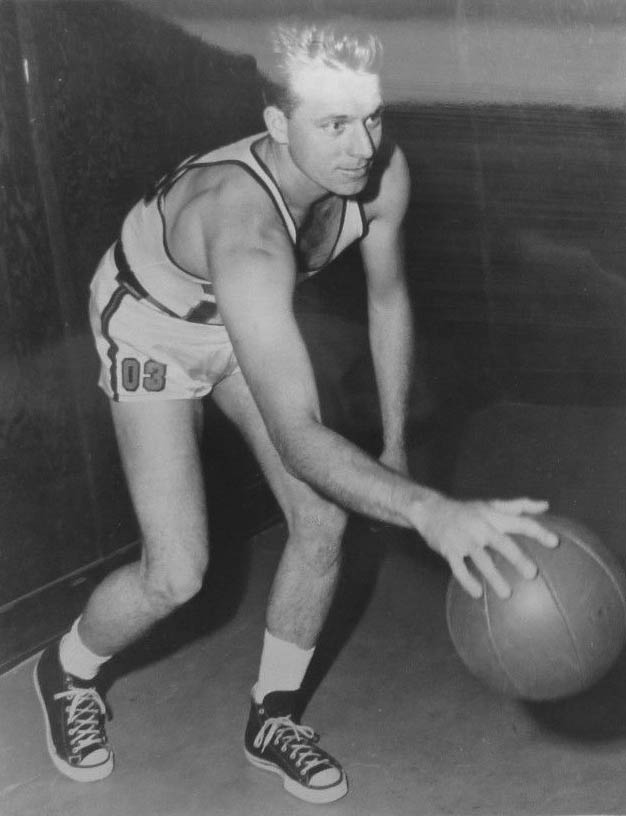
Red Holzman

- Lyle Alzado (1949–1992), actor and All Pro National Football League defensive lineman
- Jake Burton (1954–2019), snowboarding pioneer
- Helen Hicks (1911–1974), pro golfer who was one of the 13 co-founders of the LPGA in 1950
- Red Holzman (1920–1998), two-time NBA All-Star guard, former coach of the New York Knicks, Hall of Fame
- Alan Kalter (born 1943), announcer on the Late Show with David Letterman
- Lisa Lillien, cookbook author and founder of Hungrygirl.com
- Shane Olivea (1981-2022), football player
- Victor Orena (born 1934), mobster who became the acting boss of the Colombo crime family
- Alwin Max Pappenheimer Jr. (1908-1995), biochemist and immunologist after whom Pappenheimer bodies are named
- Lil Tecca (born 2002), rapper, singer and songwriter
- Evan Roberts (born 1983), radio personality
- Michael Scanlan (1931–2017), Roman Catholic priest
- Rodolfo Valentin (born 1944), celebrity hair stylist

== In popular culture ==
- Parts of the movie Married to the Mob, most notably the opening scene at the train station, were filmed in Cedarhurst.

== See also ==
- List of municipalities in New York
- List of Italian-American neighborhoods
