= Five Towns =

Informal grouping of villages in Nassau County, New York

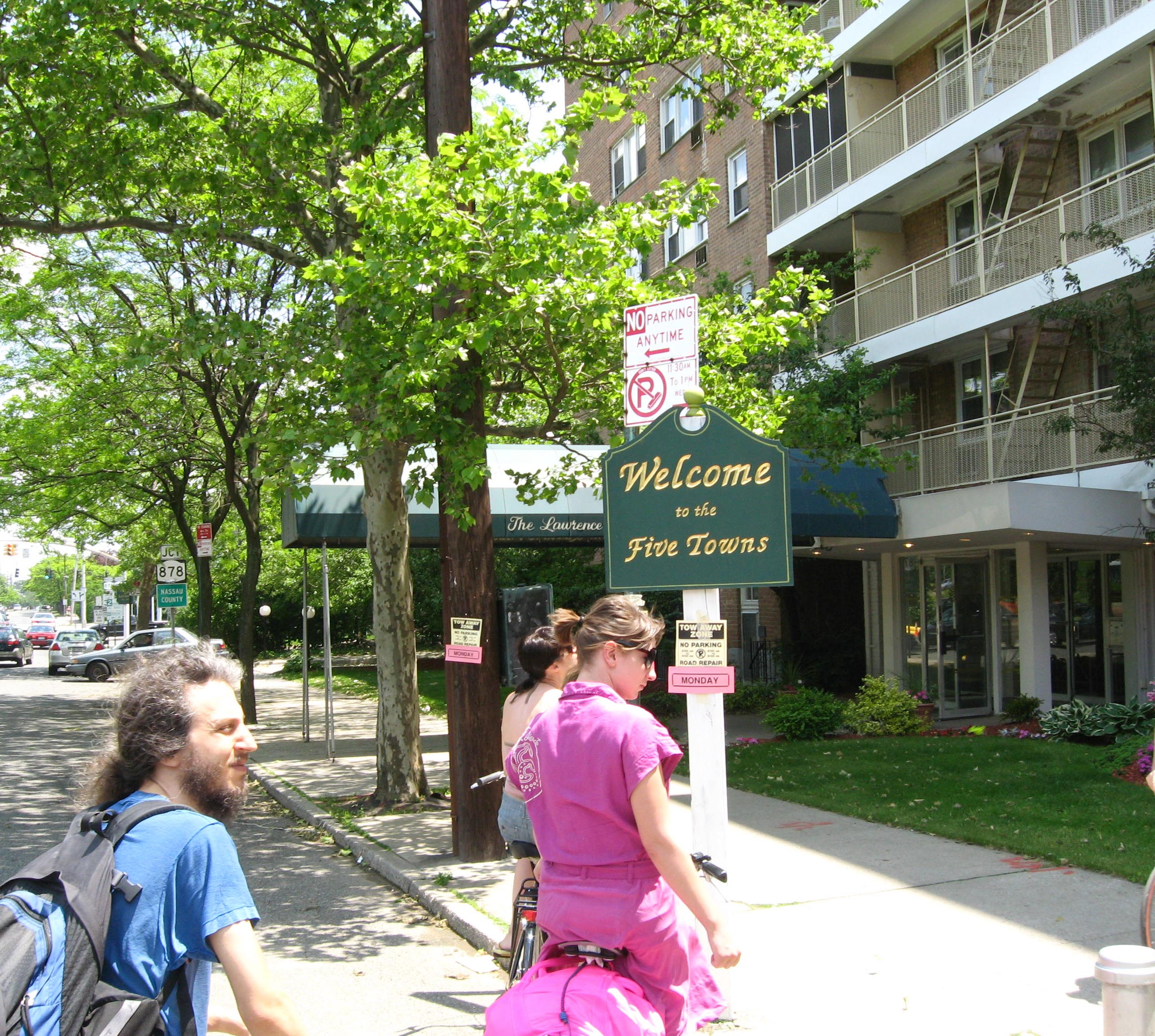
"Welcome to the Five Towns", Far Rockaway border

Location within Nassau County

The Five Towns is an informal grouping of villages and hamlets in Nassau County, New York, on the South Shore of western Long Island, adjoining the border with the borough of Queens in New York City. Although there is no official Five Towns designation, "the basic five are Lawrence, Cedarhurst, Woodmere, Hewlett and Inwood." Each of these "towns" has a consecutive stop on the Far Rockaway Branch of the Long Island Rail Road. All five communities are part of the Town of Hempstead. Woodmere is the largest and most populous community in the Five Towns, while Inwood is the second-largest community in the Five Towns.

The area also includes some unincorporated communities and two small villages, Hewlett Bay Park and Woodsburgh, that are not added to the final total. Despite the name, none of these communities are towns. The Five Towns is usually said to comprise the villages of Lawrence and Cedarhurst, the hamlets of Woodmere and Inwood, and "The Hewletts,” which consist of the villages of Hewlett Bay Park, Hewlett Harbor, and Hewlett Neck, and the hamlet of Hewlett, along with Woodsburgh.

North Woodmere is technically one of the "Five Towns" as it is served by the Five Towns' two local high schools and its constituents use the "Five Towns" many public services. Others do not consider it to be part of the "Five Towns" as it is a section of Valley Stream, separated from the rest of the Five Towns by Motts Creek. Atlantic Beach, which is located across a drawbridge from Lawrence on a barrier island it shares with Long Beach, Lido Beach and Point Lookout, is culturally linked to the Five Towns, with its students attending Five Towns public schools, but it is usually — though not always — excluded from the designation.

== History ==
The name "Five Towns" dates back to 1931, when individual Community Chest groups in the area banded together to form the "Five Towns Community Chest", consisting of Inwood, Lawrence, Cedarhurst, Woodmere, and Hewlett. The organization still exists as a local charity, but the "Five Towns" moniker caught on as a designation for the entire area. A 1933 article in The New York Times references a Girl Scouts of the USA encampment by the "Five Towns Council, embracing the villages [sic] of Inwood, Lawrence, Cedarhurst, Woodmere and Hewlett", listed in order by LIRR station.

One notable characteristic of the Five Towns is that despite the reputation of the South Shore of Nassau County being more urbanized than the North Shore, the Five Towns retains hamlets that resemble areas along Long Island's Gold Coast on the North Shore with enormous mansions and exclusive private communities along the water. The New York Times used the term "affluent" in describing the area. Inwood, however, is much less affluent than the other "towns," with a more urban character and a significantly more ethnically diverse population.

== Education ==
There are two school districts in the Five Towns, the Lawrence Public Schools (District 15) and the Hewlett-Woodmere School District (District 14). Roughly speaking, the Lawrence school district contains all of Lawrence, Cedarhurst and Inwood, and parts of Woodmere, North Woodmere, and Woodsburgh, while the Hewlett-Woodmere district contains all of Hewlett and part of Woodmere and extends partly into the neighboring villages of Lynbrook and Valley Stream (North Woodmere and Gibson in particular).

In addition, there are many private schools in the Five Towns. Among them are the independent school, Lawrence Woodmere Academy, and Jewish schools, Hebrew Academy of the Five Towns and Rockaway (HAFTR), Hebrew Academy of Long Beach (HALB), and Yeshiva of South Shore.

=== Five Towns College ===
Although Lawrence was planned to be the location for Five Towns College, the original site was no longer available by the time the school received its charter in 1972. The college is currently located in Dix Hills, Suffolk County. Other than the proposed original site, the school never had a physical connection to the Five Towns.

== Jewish community ==
By the 1980s, the Five Towns had developed a majority Jewish community. The UJA-Federation of New York estimated that 35,000 Jews lived in the locality, out of a total population of 47,048 counted at the 1980 United States census, including a rapidly growing number of Orthodox Jews. By 2010, the Five Towns hosts 53 orthodox synagogues, a number of Jewish private schools, and kosher restaurants. The Orthodox community had become so large that many incoming Orthodox families chose to move to adjoining areas like Far Rockaway and North Woodmere.

== Publications ==
As of February 2019, the Five Towns has two weekly local publications: The Nassau Herald, The Jewish Home, and The Five Towns Jewish Times.

== In popular culture ==
- The 1993 movie Amongst Friends, by Rob Weiss, was filmed and set in the Five Towns.
- The television show Entourage features a fictional show titled Five Towns, in which Johnny Drama stars as a character. The producer of the show was supposed to be actor-director Edward Burns, who in real life grew up in Valley Stream but attended Hewlett High School. When shown on Entourage the Five Towns is oddly portrayed as a gritty industrial area.
- In Thomas Pynchon's 1963 debut novel V., he mentions the Five Towns; however, he includes Malverne as being part of the group.
- In the film Goodfellas, when trying to get Henry to come along on a double date, Tommy mentions that his date lives in the Five Towns.
- Opening scene to Married to the Mob was filmed at the Cedarhurst train station (but with the trains going in the reverse direction per the director's decision).

== Notable people ==
Notable current and former residents of the Five Towns include:

- Henry Abramson (born 1963), dean of the Lander College of Arts and Sciences
- Lyle Alzado (1949–1992), former NFL football player
- Bruce Blakeman, Politician, Member of the Board of Commissioners of the Port Authority of New York and New Jersey, Nassau county executive, and 2026 New York gubernatorial election Republican Nominee
- Lil Tecca (born 2002), rapper
- Ross Bleckner (born 1949), artist
- Jake Burton Carpenter (1954–2019), founder and owner of Burton Snowboards.
- Michael Cohen (born 1966), former attorney and former lawyer for President Trump
- Howard Deutch (born 1950), movie director
- Debra Drimmer, VP of Talent, Comedy Central
- Gordon Edelstein, Artistic Director of the Long Wharf Theatre in New Haven, Connecticut
- David Friedman (born 1958), former US Ambassador to Israel
- Jane Friedman, President and CEO, HarperCollins
- Jeffrey M. Friedman (born 1954), molecular geneticist and discoverer of leptin
- James E. Gaffney, owner of the Boston Braves baseball team, winners of the 1914 World Series
- Lisa Glasberg (born 1956), NYC radio DJ
- Barbara Gaines, Producer, Late Show with David Letterman, Emmy Award Winner
- Rande Gerber, nightclub owner married to Cindy Crawford
- Brent Glass, director of the Smithsonian National Museum of American History
- Louise Glück, Poet, Pulitzer Prize for Poetry in 1993, United States Poet Laureate 2003-04, Nobel Laureate in Literature 2020
- Hyman Golden Cofounder of Snapple
- Carolyn Gusoff, WNBC news anchor
- Joan Hamburg, radio personality
- Mickey Hart, drummer of The Grateful Dead
- Karen Friedman Hill, who married Mobster Henry Hill – whose life was immortalized by Nicholas Pileggi's book Wiseguy and Martin Scorsese's 1990 film Goodfellas – hailed from Lawrence, and the newlyweds initially lived there with Karen's parents
- Red Holzman (1920–1998), New York Knicks head coach
- David M. Israel, TV producer/writer
- Donna Karan (born 1948), fashion designer
- Aline Kominsky-Crumb, comics artist
- Stan Lee, Marvel comics writer, co-creator of Spider-Man and other comic characters, actor
- Peggy Lipton (born 1946), actress
- Steve Madden (born 1958), shoe designer
- Gene Mayer, professional tennis player
- Harvey Milk (1930–1978), first openly gay man to be elected to public office in the United States, as a city supervisor in San Francisco
- Bruce Murray, host of the Murray in the Morning radio show
- Danny Porush investment banker/entrepreneur
- Evan Roberts (born 1983), WFAN host
- Seth Rudetsky (born 1967), composer, musical director and talk show host
- Jim Steinman (1947–2021), music producer and composer, best known for working with Meat Loaf, Celine Dion and Bonnie Tyler
- Jacob Steinmetz American Baseball player and Pitcher in the Arizona Diamondbacks Organization
- Rob Weiss, director/producer Amongst Friends, Entourage
- Stuart Weitzman (born 1941), shoe designer
- Leslie West (born 1945), musician of the hard rock group Mountain
- Alan Zweibel (born 1950), writer / producer
