= Hebrew Academy =

Hebrew Academy may refer to:

== Organisations ==
- The Academy of the Hebrew Language, Hebrew language regulator
- Hebrew Academy for Special Children, non-profit organization

== Education ==
=== Canada ===
- Hebrew Academy, Jewish day school in Montreal, Quebec
- Tanenbaum Community Hebrew Academy of Toronto, high school in Toronto, Ontario
- Vancouver Hebrew Academy, Jewish day school in Vancouver, British Columbia

=== United States ===
- American Hebrew Academy, Jewish preparatory school in Greensboro, North Carolina
- Epstein Hebrew Academy, Jewish day school in Olivette, Missouri
- Greenfield Hebrew Academy, Jewish day school in Atlanta, Georgia
- Hebrew Academy of Cleveland, Jewish day school in Cleveland, Ohio
- Hebrew Academy of Long Beach, Jewish day school in Long Beach, New York
- Hebrew Academy of Nassau County, Jewish high school in Nassau County, New York
- Hebrew Academy of San Francisco, also known as Lisa Kampner Hebrew Academy, Jewish day school in San Francisco, California
- Hebrew Academy of the Five Towns and Rockaway, Jewish day school in Lawrence, New York
- Hebrew Academy of Tidewater, elementary school in Virginia Beach, Virginia
- Hebrew Language Academy Charter School, charter school in Brooklyn, New York
- Hyman Brand Hebrew Academy, Jewish day school in Overland Park, Kansas
- Jack M. Barrack Hebrew Academy, Jewish day school in Bryn Mawr, Pennsylvania
- Joseph Kushner Hebrew Academy, yeshiva day school in Livingston, New Jersey
- Phoenix Hebrew Academy, Jewish day school in Phoenix, Arizona
- Politz Hebrew Academy, Jewish school in Philadelphia, Pennsylvania
- Rabbi Alexander S. Gross Hebrew Academy, Jewish high school in Miami, Florida
- Seattle Hebrew Academy, Jewish day school in Seattle, Washington
- Margolin Hebrew Academy, Jewish day school in Memphis, Tennessee
- Melvin J. Berman Hebrew Academy, Jewish day school in Rockville, Maryland
- North Shore Hebrew Academy, yeshiva in Great Neck, New York
- Tucson Hebrew Academy, Jewish day school in Tucson, Arizona
