= THA =

Tha or THA may refer to:

== Language ==
- Tha language, an Adamawa language of Nigeria
- tha, the ISO 639-3 code for the Thai language
- Ṯāʾ, a letter of the Arabic abjad
- Ṭha (Indic) a letter of Indic abugidas
- Tha (Javanese) (ꦛ), a syllable
- Yorkshire form of thou

== Organisations ==
- Tobago House of Assembly, a legislative body
- Transvaal Horse Artillery, a South African army regiment
- Troy Housing Authority, an agency of Troy, New York that subsidizes public housing
- Tucson Hebrew Academy, an American Jewish day school

== Transportation ==
- THA, the IATA code for Tullahoma Regional Airport in the state of Tennessee, US
- THA, the ICAO code for Thai Airways International
- THA, the National Rail code for Thatcham railway station in the county of Berkshire, UK

== Entertainment ==
- Tha (film), an Indian film
- Tha, a track by Aphex Twin on Selected Ambient Works 85–92

== Medicine ==
- Tetrahydroaminoacridine or Tacrine
- Total hip arthroplasty or hip replacement

== Other uses ==
- Temporary Housing Area, former Hong Kong housing project
- Texas Heartbeat Act, anti-abortion legislation
