= Metropolitan Yeshiva High School Athletic League =

The Metropolitan Yeshiva High School Athletic League (MYHSAL), or Yeshiva League, is a high school athletic league consisting of 36 Modern/Centrist Orthodox and two pluralist Yeshivas in the New York Metropolitan Area. It includes the sports of basketball, floor hockey, volleyball, soccer, baseball, tennis, and softball. The league, and particularly its sport of floor hockey, was described by The New York Times in a 2017 piece. Jared Kushner played hockey in the league while attending the Frisch School.

== Member schools ==
The MYHSAL member schools are:

School	Gender	Hashkafa	City	State	Enrollment	Established
Barkai Yeshivah (Barkai)	Coed	Sephardi	Midwood, Brooklyn	New York	unknown	unknown
Bruriah High School for Girls (Bruriah)	Girls	Modox	Elizabeth, New Jersey	New Jersey	240	1963
Yeshiva University High School for Girls–Central (Central)	Girls	Modox	Holliswood, New York	New York	299	1948
Yeshiva Darchei Torah	Boys	Haredi	Far Rockaway, Queens	New York	2,500	1973
Davis Renov Stahler Yeshiva High School (DRS)	Boys	Modox	Woodmere, New York	New York	335	1997
Yeshivah of Flatbush	Coed	Modox	Midwood, Brooklyn	New York	631	1927
Frisch School (Frisch)	Coed	Modox	Paramus, New Jersey	New Jersey	923	1972
Hebrew Academy of the Five Towns and Rockaway (HAFTR)	Coed	Modox	Lawrence, Nassau County, New York	New York	378	1978
Hebrew Academy of Nassau County (HANC)	Coed	Modox	Uniondale, New York	New York	463	1953
Heichal HaTorah	Boys	Modox	Teaneck, New Jersey	New Jersey	150	2012
Abraham Joshua Heschel School (Heschel)	Coed	Pluralistic	Upper West Side, Manhattan	New York	962	2001
Hillel Yeshiva	Coed	Sephardi	Ocean Township, Monmouth County, New Jersey	New Jersey	916	1950
Ilan High School	Girls	Sephardi	Asbury Park, New Jersey	New Jersey	163	unknown
Jewish Educational Center (JEC)	Boys	Modox	Elizabeth, New Jersey	New Jersey	145	1940
Rae Kushner Yeshiva High School (Kushner)	Coed	Modox	Livingston, New Jersey	New Jersey	735	1942
Ma'ayanot Yeshiva High School (Ma'ayanot)	Girls	Modox	Teaneck, New Jersey	New Jersey	311	1996
Yeshivat Magen Abraham	Boys	Sephardi	Manhattan Beach, Brooklyn	New York	40	unknown
Magen David Yeshivah High School (Magen David)	Boys	Sephardi	Gravesend, Brooklyn	New York	2,000	1946
Mesivta Ateres Yaakov (MAY)	Boys	Haredi	Lawrence, New York	New York	250	1987
Marsha Stern Talmudical Academy (MTA)	Boys	Modox	Washington Heights, Manhattan	New York	323	1916
Naaleh High School for Girls (Naaleh)	Girls	Modox	Fair Lawn, New Jersey	New York	unknown	unknown
Mesivta Netzach HaTorah (Netzach)	Boys	Haredi	Woodmere, New York	New York	unknown	unknown
North Shore Hebrew Academy	Coed	Modox	Great Neck, New York	New York	416	1954
Ohr Yisroel	Boys	Haredi	Tenafly, New Jersey	New Jersey	unknown	unknown
Ramaz School	Coed	Modox	Upper East Side	New York	267	1937
Rambam Mesivta	Boys	Modox	Lawrence, Nassau County, New York	New York	178	1991
SAR High School	Coed	Modox	Riverdale, Bronx	New York	636	2003
Yeshivat Shaare Torah (Shaare)	Both, single-gender	Sephardi	Midwood, Brooklyn	New York	429	1982
Shulamith School for Girls	Girls	Modox	Woodmere, New York	New York	172	1930
Stella K. Abraham High School for Girls (SKA)	Girls	Modox	Hewlett Bay Park, New York	New York	355	1992
Schechter School of Long Island (SSLI)	Coed	Conservative	Williston Park, New York	New York	261	unknown
Torah Academy of Bergen County (TABC)	Boys	Modox	Teaneck, New Jersey	New Jersey	327	1982
Mesivta Ateres Shmuel of Waterbury (Waterbury)	Boys	Haredi	Durham, Connecticut	Connecticut	185	unknown
Westchester Hebrew High School (WHHS)	Coed	Modox	Mamaroneck, New York	New York	110	unknown
Yeshivat Darche Eres (YDE Boys)	Boys	Sephardi	Sheepshead Bay, Brooklyn	New York	unknown	unknown
Yeshivat Darche Eres (YDE Girls)	Girls	Sephardi	Gravesend, Brooklyn	New York	unknown	unknown
