= Jonathan Frankel (entrepreneur) =

Developer and entrepreneur

Jonathan Frankel (Yonatan Frankel) is a self-described entrepreneur, and co-founder/CEO of Nucleus.

== Early life ==
Frankel, a graduate of DRS HALB (Davis Renov Stahler Yeshiva High School for Boys), obtained rabbinical ordination, a Baccalaureate in Computer Science from Yeshiva University, and then continued his education at Harvard Law School(JD).

== Career ==
After Harvard he worked at Boston Consulting Group.

=== Nucleus ===
His 2013 Nucleus backers included former NFL quarterback Joe Montana, Founders Fund's billionaire Peter Thiel, and LinkedIn co-founder Reid Hoffman. CNET described their product as "a touchscreen-enabled intercom system." Frankel's followup NucleusCare offering focuses on the intercom and site-to-site needs of home-care agencies and senior-care facilities. His 2016 round of funding, $5.6 million, was led by Amazon.
