= List of mesivtas =

This article is a list of mesivtas. A mesivta (or mesifta) is a Jewish Orthodox secondary school for boys. The term is commonly used in the United States to describe a yeshiva that emphasizes Talmudic studies for boys in grades 9 through 11 or 12; alternately, it refers to the religious studies track in a yeshiva high school that offers both religious and secular studies.

== Australia ==
- Mesivta Melbourne

== Canada ==
- Mesivta Ateres Menachem of Montreal
- Mesivta Birchas Shmuel of Toronto
- Mesivta Chabad Lubavitch of Toronto
- Mesivta Ohr Tmimim of Toronto (The better Chabad mesivta)
- Yeshiva Darchei Torah of Toronto
- Yeshivas Nachlas Tzvi of Toronto
- Yeshivas Ner Yisroel of Toronto
- Yeshiva Gedola Zichron Shmayahu of Toronto
- Yeshivas Mishkan HaTorah of Toronto
- Yeshivas Mishkan Yosef of Toronto

== Israel ==
- Mesivta Beit Shemesh
- List of Israeli Yeshiva high-schools (Hebrew category)
- List of Israeli Yeshivot ketanot (Hebrew category)

== United Kingdom ==
- Manchester Mesivta School

=== Arizona ===
- Yeshiva High School of Arizona. Phoenix
- Yeshivas HaTurim. Rabbi Shimon Green's Yeshiva Phoenix

=== California ===
- Mesivta of Los Angeles, Los Angeles
- Mesivta of Greater Los Angeles, Calabasas
- Mesivta Birkas Yitzchok, Los Angeles
- Yeshiva Gedolah of Los Angeles, Los Angeles
- Southern California Yeshiva High School, San Diego
- Valley Torah High School, Valley Village
- Yeshiva Ohr Elchonon Chabad High School, Los Angeles

=== Colorado ===
- Denver Academy of Torah, Denver
- Yeshiva Toras Chaim, Denver

=== Connecticut ===
- Mesivta Ateres Shmuel, Waterbury
- Yeshiva Beis Dovid Shlomo, New Haven

=== Florida ===
- Klurman Mesivta High School, Miami Beach
- Mesivta of Greater Miami
- Mesivta of Coral Springs
- Rabbi Alexander S. Gross Hebrew Academy
- South Florida Jewish Academy, Coconut Creek
- Weinbaum Yeshiva High School, Boca Raton
- Yeshiva Doresh, Miami
- Yeshiva Toras Chaim Toras Emes, North Miami Beach

=== Georgia ===
- Yeshiva Ohr Yisrael. Atlanta

=== Illinois ===
- Fasman Yeshiva High School
- Hebrew Theological College
- Telshe Yeshiva of Chicago
- Yeshivas Ohr Eliyahu Lubavitch Mesivta of Chicago

=== Indiana ===
- Yeshiva Gedola of South Bend

=== Iowa ===
- Lubavitch Mesivta of Postville

=== Maryland ===
- Bais Hamedrash and Mesivta of Baltimore
- Mesivta Kesser Torah of Baltimore
- Mesivta Neimus Hatorah
- Yeshiva of Greater Washington, Silver Spring
- Yeshivas Toras Chaim of Baltimore

=== Massachusetts ===
- Mesivta High School of Greater Boston, Brighton
- Yeshiva Ohr Yisrael, Chestnut Hill

=== Michigan ===
- Yeshiva Gedolah Ateres Mordechai of Greater Detroit
- Mesivta of West Bloomfield
- Lubavitch Mesivta and Yeshiva Oak Park

=== Minnesota ===
- Yeshiva of Minneapolis

=== Missouri ===
- Mesivta d'Missouri (St. Louis)
- Missouri Torah Institute, Chesterfield

=== Nevada ===
- Mesivta of Las Vegas, Henderson

=== New Jersey ===
- Mesivta Zichron Baruch, Clifton
- Mesivta Nachlas Dovid (Rabbi Lurria)
- Mesivta Pe'er Hatorah, Lakewood
- Mesivta Ohr Torah of Lakewood
- Mesivta of Eatontown
- Mesivta Me'or Hatorah, Lakewood

=== New York ===
- Kaminetzer Mesivta of Boro Park
- Mesivta Ateres Yaakov, Long Island
- Mesivta Beis Yisroel (Ger)
- Mesivta Beth Shraga, Monsey
- Mesivta Chaim Shlomo, Far Rockaway
- Mesivta Chofetz Chaim, Flushing
- Mesivta Eitz Chaim of Bobov, Brooklyn
- Mesivta Kesser Yisroel of Willowbrook, Staten Island
- Mesivta Menachem of Buffalo
- Mesivta Nachlas Yakov, Brooklyn (Vien)
- Mesivta of Eastern Parkway
- Mesivta of Long Beach
- Yeshiva Mesivta D'Brooklyn (YOB)
- Mesivta Ohel Shmuel, Bedford Hills
- Mesivta Ohel Torah, Monsey
- Mesivta Rabbi Chaim Berlin, Brooklyn
- Mesivta Rabbi Samson Raphael Hirsch, New York
- Mesivta Bais Ahron Tzvi Veretzky, Brooklyn
- Mesivta Tiferes Yisroel, Brooklyn
- Mesivta Tifereth Yerushalayim, New York and Staten Island
- Mesivta Torah Vodaath, Brooklyn
- Mesivta Yam HaTorah, Bayswater
- Mesivta Yesodei Yeshurun, Kew Gardens Hills
- Oholei Torah Mesivta, Brooklyn
- Rambam Mesivta, Long Island
- UTA Mesivta of Kiryas Joel

=== North Carolina ===
- American Hebrew Academy, Greensboro

=== Ohio ===
- Hebrew Academy of Cleveland
- Telshe Yeshiva, Wycliffe
- Yeshivas Ahavas HaTorah, Cleveland
- Yeshivas Lubavitch, Cincinnati
- Mesivta of Cincinnati

=== Pennsylvania ===
- Kohelet Yeshiva High School, Merion Station
- Mesivta Of Allegheny County, White Oak
- Mesivta High School of Greater Philadelphia, Bala Cynwyd
- Mesivta Yesodai Yisael, Elkins Park
- Milton Eisner Yeshiva High School, Scranton
- Talmudical Yeshiva of Philadelphia

=== Rhode Island ===
- New England Rabbinical College, (Providence, Rhode Island)

=== South Carolina ===
- Yeshiva Lubavitch of Myrtle Beach

=== Tennessee ===
- Margolin Hebrew Academy, Memphis
- Feinstone Yeshiva of the South, Memphis

=== Texas ===
- Texas Torah Institute, Dallas
- Mesivta of Houston https://www.mesivtaofhouston.org/

=== Virginia ===
- Yeshiva of Virginia, Richmond

=== Washington ===
- Northwest Yeshiva High School, Mercer Island

=== Wisconsin ===
- Mesivta Yeshiva Gedolah of Milwaukee
- Wisconsin Institute for Torah Study, Milwaukee

== See also ==
- List of Midrashot
- List of Jewish communities in North America
- List of synagogues in Canada
- List of synagogues in the United States
