= Eliezer Silver =

Lithuanian-American Orthodox Jewish rabbi

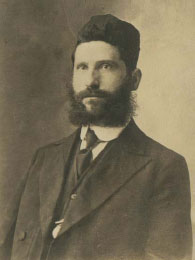
Rabbi Eliezer Silver in his younger years

Eliezer Silver (Hebrew: אליעזר סילבר; February 15, 1882 - February 7, 1968) was the President of the Union of Orthodox Rabbis of the U.S. and Canada and among American Jewry's foremost religious leaders. He helped save many thousands of Jews in the Second World War and held several Rabbinical positions in New York, Pennsylvania, Massachusetts and Ohio.

== Biography ==
Silver was born in Obeliai, Lithuania, one of two sons of Rabbi Bunim Tzemach (1844–1917) and Malka Silver. He had centuries-old rabbinic ancestry. He studied in Dvinsk, with Rabbi Yosef Rosen (the "Rogatchover Gaon") and received Semicha from Rabbi Chaim Ozer Grodzinski in 1906. He immigrated to the United States with his wife in 1907, to escape the anti-Semitism of Czarist Russia. They settled in New York City, where Silver worked as a garment salesman and later sold insurance.

However, Silver soon accepted a Rabbinical position at Kesher Israel Congregation in Harrisburg, Pennsylvania, which he served from 1907 to 1925. His Torah scholarship soon drew him into leading Orthodox circles on the national level. In 1912, he was part of a delegation of rabbis that asked President William Howard Taft to void a treaty with Russia because of Russia's persecution of Jews.

Silver was active in relief efforts in World War I. In 1925 he moved to Springfield, Massachusetts. Around 1931, he accepted an invitation to become Rabbi in Cincinnati, Ohio, where he remained until his death. While in Cincinnati, he caused much controversy when he established the Vaad Hoir of Cincinnati. The most prominent opponent of the Vaad was Rabbi Bezalel Epstein, who "already had his own kashrut supervision and who viewed Rabbi Silver's activities as encroachment."

Silver was very active in the Union of Orthodox Rabbis of the U.S. and Canada, elected its president in 1929. He was also a pivotal founder, organizer, and president of Agudath Israel of America.

== World War II rescue activities ==
Silver convened an emergency meeting in November 1939 in New York City, where the Vaad Hatzalah (Rescue Committee), was formed, with Silver as president. Silver spearheaded its efforts in rescuing as many European Torah scholars as possible from Nazi Europe.

Silver launched a fund-raising drive that raised more than $5 million (over $100 million in 2023 dollars), and also capitalised on an exemption to US immigration quotas allowing entry to ministers or religious students. At his direction, synagogues in Cincinnati and across the country sent contracts to rabbis, thereby securing 2,000 emergency visas that were telegraphed to Eastern Europe.

With the increasingly desperate race against time, the Vaad, under Silver turned to all channels, whether legal or not, to save as many lives as possible by bringing Jews to the US, Canada and Palestine.

During World War II, a Vaad representative in Switzerland even negotiated with the SS, offering to ransom concentration camp prisoners for cash and tractors - talks that freed hundreds from Bergen-Belsen and other death camps.

In October 1943, as the scale of Nazi atrocities was becoming clearer, Silver helped organise and lead a mass rally of more than 400 rabbis in Washington, D.C. to press for more decisive action by the US government to save European Jews. The rabbis' march was organized by Hillel Kook's "Emergency Committee to Save the Jewish People of Europe".

== Post-World War II ==
In 1949 Silver founded the Chofetz Chaim Day School (also known as the Cincinnati Hebrew Day School.) He died in 1968, at the age of 85 or 86. He was interred at Washington Cemetery (Knesseth Israel) in Cincinnati. He had been Rabbi of the Kneseth Israel Congregation in Cincinnati for nearly 40 years, now known as Congregation Zichron Eliezer. He authored the Sefer titled Anfe Erez.

== Noteworthy students ==
One of his star students was Rabbi Shlomo Wahrman, who came from Leipzig for fifteen years and went on to becoming principal and Rosh Yeshiva of the Hebrew Academy of Nassau County. Wahrman attributes his success to Silver's insistence and encouragement to hone his writing skills and record his copious chidushei Torah. Wahrman writes in the short biography he published on Silver:

I remember at times he screamed at me for lack of understanding-however, even then I sensed his great love and concern for me and not the slightest hint of hatred. Rabbi Silver was a man whose very essence was giving to others - his ahavas yisroel (love for his fellow Jew) knew no bounds…he saw every Jew as an extension of himself.
