= Abraham Joshua Heschel School =

Private school in New York City, United States

Coordinates: 40°46′20″N 73°59′23″W

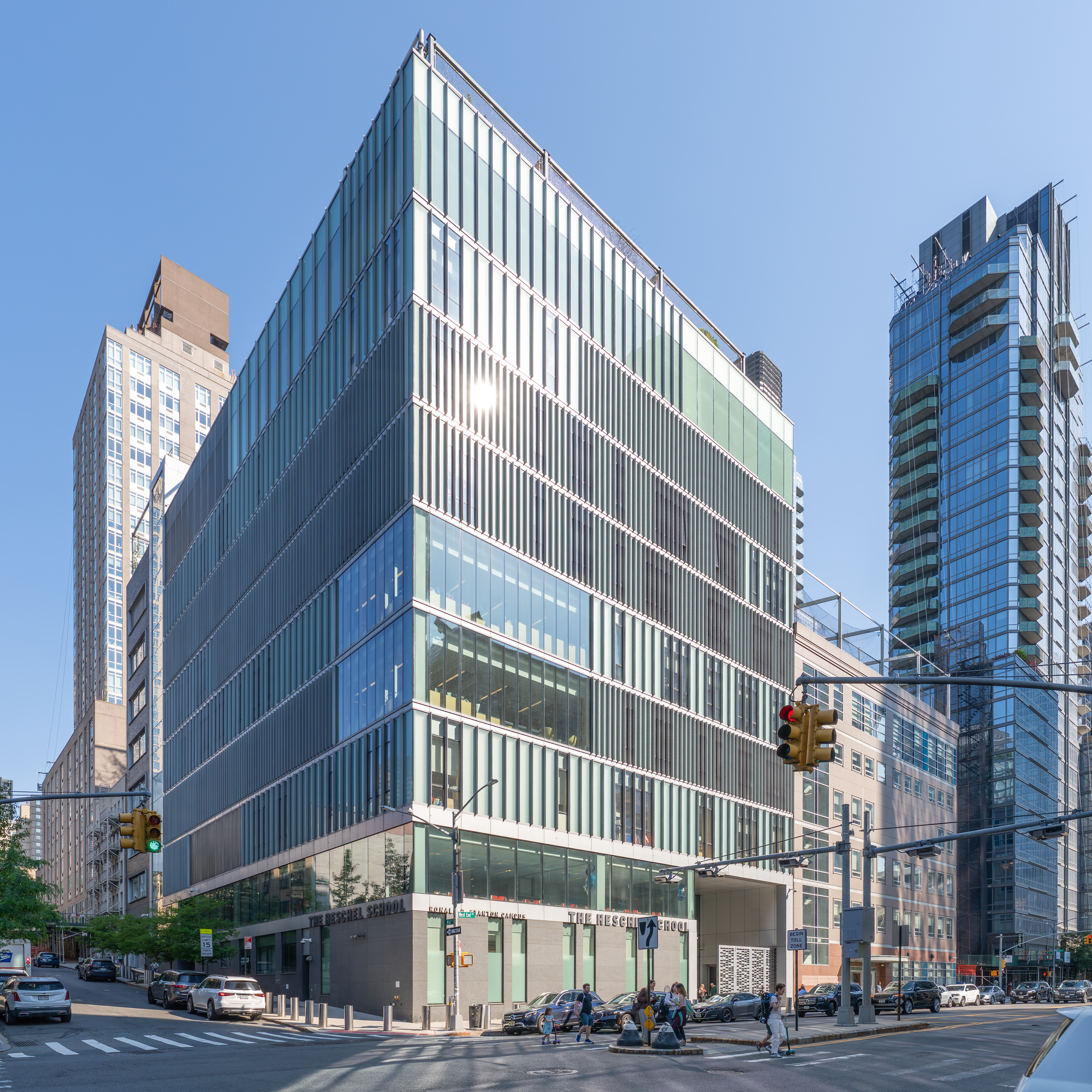
- New York, New York; United States

Information
- School type: Private
- Religious affiliation: Jewish
- Denomination: Pluralistic Judaism
- Founded: 1981 (high school in 2001)
- Founder: Peter Geffen
- Superintendent/ Principal Administrator: Ariela Dubler
- Team name: Heschel Heat
- Tuition: $60,000
- Lower School Location: 30 West End Avenue
- Middle School Location: 30 West End Avenue
- High School Location: 20 West End Avenue
- Enrollment: 950
- Website: www.heschel.org

The Abraham Joshua Heschel School (AJHS) is a "pluralistic" nursery to 12th grade Jewish day school in New York City named in memory of Abraham Joshua Heschel, a major Jewish leader, teacher, and activist of the 20th century.

Other "Heschel Schools" are located in Los Angeles, California, as well as Toronto, and Hamilton, Ontario, Canada. Besides having similar names, the four schools are otherwise unrelated.

== School ==
The Abraham Joshua Heschel School was originally put in three buildings: The Early Childhood (kindergarten and pre-school) Center and lower school was located on West 89th Street, the middle school on West 91st Street, and a newer high school on 60th Street at 20 West End Avenue (opened in 2001). In the summer of 2009, it was announced that construction would begin on a new building on 61st Street at 30 West End Avenue, adjacent to the high school building, which would house the Early Childhood, lower school, and middle school divisions. The planned new facility was referred to as the "Weird Campus Plan," and construction began in 2009. The new facility would include space to expand the number of classes in Kindergarten through 8th grade, and the school began running extra classes starting with the class entering kindergarten in the 2010–2011 school year.

The new facility, officially known as the Ronald D. Stanton Campus and designed by architects IBI Group-Gruzen Samton, opened for the 2012–2013 school year, on schedule and under budget.

On December 18, 2013, the school announced that Columbia Law School Professor Ariela Dubler would take the helm as Head of School in 2014 after the retirement of Roanna Shorofsky.

In early 2015, Heschel High School head Ahuva Halberstam announced that she would be leaving the post at the end of the academic year to help found another Jewish school. She was replaced by Rabbi Noam Silverman, formerly the Principal of Hebrew and Jewish Studies at Gideon Hausner Jewish Day School in Palo Alto, California.

== Academics ==
The school has had a student-teacher ratio of 6:1. In 2023 it had approximately 1,000 students.

=== Clubs ===
Clubs constitute a large part of the social life at The Heschel High School. Most clubs are supervised by a faculty member. Some clubs, such as College Bowl and Art Appreciation, are completely student supervised.

==== List of clubs ====
- Harmonizers
- Architecture
- Art Appreciation
- Backgammon
- Biblical Academics
- Book
- Chesed
- Chess
- Coding
- College Bowl - "The Heschel Velociraptors"
- Common Ground Friends
- Creative Writing
- Debate
- Drama
- Dungeons & Dragons
- Engineering
- Fashion
- Film
- Film Appreciation
- Finance
- French
- Gender and Sexuality Alliance
- Global Current Events
- Harry Potter
- Horticulture
- Interfaith
- Israel Connection - "Kesher"
- Israeli Movies
- Jazz/Rock Ensemble
- Junior State of America
- Literary magazine - "Epitome"
- Mock Trial
- Model UN
- Moot Beth Din
- Music Appreciation
- Musical Theater
- Newspaper - "The Heschel Helios"
- Philosophy
- Photography
- Scuba
- Skiing and Snowboarding
- Society for American Baseball Research
- Student Admissions Reps.
- Super Smash Bros.
- Sustainability
- Swim
- Yearbook

Also included in the clubs category are committees that exist within the High School. Such committees include Student Government. These groups are not open to participants, but rather representatives are elected by the Student Bodies.

- Student Association
- Graduation Committee
- Student Admission Representatives- SARs
- Va'adat Moadim

=== Technological integration ===
The High School is a "laptop school." All students are very required to obtain a laptop to use as a learning tool throughout their education. Teachers are readily equipped with laptops, and all classrooms contain smartboards.

== Sports ==
The Heschel Heat is the name carried by the various sports teams that play for the High School. The teams include boys and girls basketball, girls volleyball, boys volleyball, tennis, baseball, soccer, floor hockey, track and field, and ultimate frisbee. The baseball team has played at the Naimoli Family Baseball Complex at Fairleigh Dickinson University since the 2011 season. Led by team captain Avi Raber, the baseball team reached the semi-finals in the 2013 Yeshiva League playoffs.

The Heschel Heat boys junior varsity 2008-09 basketball team won the school's first Yeshiva league basketball championship. The Varsity Basketball team won the 2019 championship on a buzzer-beater and-1 layup by Ricky Sutton. Led by captain Tal E. Visser, the basketball team held a winning record and reached the playoffs in 2024.

The Heschel Heat ultimate frisbee team won both the city and state championships in 2024. They are the smallest team to ever win the New York state championship and the only Jewish school to ever win. They reached the state finals in 2025 as well.

The Heschel Heat JV Boys Indoor Soccer team won the MYSHAL championship in 2025 as the 1 seed in the Western Conference, going 7-0-1. In the play-offs Heschel ended up beating the Frisch Cougars 15-10 in the semi-finals and the SAR Sting 10-6 in the Championship.

== See also ==
- Education in New York City
- Abraham Joshua Heschel
