= Mesivta Ateres Yaakov =

Orthodox Jewish school in Lawrence, New York

Location
- 131 Washington Avenue, Lawrence, New York, United States of America
- 40.620199°N 73.727210°W

Information
- School type: Private School
- Motto: Rabbeim for life. Education for life. Torah for life.
- Religious affiliation: Jewish
- Established: 1987
- NCES District ID: A0302259
- Administrator: Mordechai Yaffe
- Grades: 9th-12th
- Enrollment: 200-250
- Student to teacher ratio: 11:1
- Campus type: Suburban
- Color
- Mascot: Eagle
- Newspaper: AY Star, Ateres HaShavua
- Website: https://www.ateresyaakov.com

Mesivta Ateres Yaakov (commonly referred to as MAY) is an Orthodox Jewish, all-male high school in Lawrence, New York. Founded in 1987 as a part of the Yeshiva of South Shore, the Mesivta became both financially and administratively independent in 2003. By 2010, a rapidly expanding student body saw the Mesivta move to a 27,000-square-foot (2,500 m^{2}) campus in Lawrence, New York, where it currently operates.

== History ==
MAY was first established as a secondary school for the Yeshiva of South Shore in 1987. After years of growth, financial issues caught up to the Yeshiva, prompting MAY to become an independent organization by 2003, and move operations to Lynbrook. After success in Lynbrook, the Mesivta moved to a 3.5 million dollar campus in Lawrence, New York.

In 2018, successful fundraising allowed for an indoor basketball gym to be built on premises. School wide renovations, including a remodeling of the synagogue featuring an intricate Torah ark followed.

== Academics ==
MAY employs a dual-curriculum in which the students spend half the day studying Jewish subjects, and the other half devoted to secular education. According to school-published statistics, 98% of MAY alumni take a gap year in Israel, followed by 95% who attend four-year college. MAY students perform high on New York State Regents Examinations; MAY students averaged 6 points higher on the NYS Physics Regent Exam than public schools.

== Charitable works ==
In 2014, the MAY student government donated a rescue boat to the Lawrence-Cedarhurst Fire Department. Then-mayor Andrew J. Parise praised the donation as one that will "Always be remembered with pride."

The school holds blood drives annually.

== Athletics ==
MAY supports separate varsity and junior-varsity teams for basketball, softball and flag-football. The basketball and football teams are part of the "Yeshiva League;" the softball team is part of the Metropolitan Yeshiva High School Athletic League).

The Torah Bowl team has won the eastern division championship in 11 of 15 years it has participated, as well as the national championship twice.

== See also ==
- List of Mesivtas
- Torah Umadda
- Orthodox Judaism
