= Steven Pruzansky =

American-Israeli rabbi, lawyer, activist, and author

Rabbi Steven Pruzansky

Personal life
- Born: April 28, 1958 (age 68) Bronx, New York City, New York
- Spouse: Karen Hausdorff
- Children: 4
- Education: Columbia University; Yeshiva University
- Occupation: Rabbi

Religious life
- Religion: Judaism
- Denomination: Orthodox

Jewish leader
- Successor: Elliot Schrier
- Position: Senior Rabbi
- Synagogue: Congregation Bnai Yeshurun, Teaneck, New Jersey
- Began: 1993
- Ended: 2020
- Other: Rabbi Emeritus, Bnai Yeshurun (since 2020)

Rabbi Steven Pruzansky (born in the Bronx, N.Y. April 28, 1958) is an American Orthodox rabbi, an author and leader in the Orthodox Jewish community.

Pruzansky is best known for a quarter century of spiritual leadership at Congregation Bnai Yeshurun in Teaneck, New Jersey. He has also authored several books on religious topics, been an executive at the Rabbinical Council of America, and a spokesman for the International Rabbinic Coalition for Israel.

Some of his opinions have generated controversy and criticism, including comments about college campus rape culture.

== Early life and education ==
Pruzansky grew up in Monsey, New York. Pruzansky graduated from Yeshiva University High School for Boys in 1975. He received his B.A. Degree from Columbia University in 1978 and in 1981 he received his Juris Doctor degree from Benjamin N. Cardozo School of Law of Yeshiva University.

== Career ==
Following graduation from law school, Pruzansky worked as an attorney and litigator for 13 years. He then began his career as a religious leader after being ordained at Yeshiva Bnei Torah of Far Rockaway, New York. In 1993 he became rabbi of Congregation Bnai Yeshurun, one of the largest Orthodox congregations in the United States with several thousand members. He retired in 2020 and was succeeded by Rabbi Elliot Schrier in 2021.

For seven years, Pruzansky led the RCA's conversion court or beit din for Bergen County, where his congregation is located. However, after Rabbi Barry Freundel of the RCA was arrested on charges of voyeurism for spying on women at a mikva and was accused of abusing potential converts, the RCA appointed a committee that will include women to review the conversion process and safeguards. Pruzansky resigned from the Bergen County beit din in protest. He said he blamed the action on the left wing of the Orthodox movement for creating "quasi-rabbinical functions for women."

== Publications ==
Pruzansky is author of several books, including "The Jewish Ethic of Personal Responsibility Volume 1: Breisheet and Shemot," "Prophet for Today: Contemporary Lessons of the Book of Yehoshua," and "Judges for Our Time: Contemporary Lessons from the Book of Shoftim." He also maintains a blog.

== Controversies ==
Abraham Foxman, the national director of the Anti-Defamation League, who had been a longtime member of Pruzansky's congregation, left in protest against political statements Pruzansky had made about Israeli Prime Minister Rabin, including calling him the "Rabin Judenrat." Foxman complained that Pruzansky ""spews hate and vitriol toward the elected leaders of Israel."

Following the election of U.S. President Barack Obama, members of Pruzansky's community organized a petition to protest a blog post he wrote insulting the president. He wrote that the president won by "pandering to liberal women, Hispanics, blacks, unions, etc."

In November 2014 Pruzansky likened The New York Jewish Week to Der Stürmer, a Nazi publication, following a story it published about him.

Pruzansky also posted a blog that month entitled "Dealing with Savages," which many considered to be racist and anti-Arab. In it, he proposed using live ammunition on Arab stone-throwers and suggests that any village that is home to more than two terrorists should be razed and its inhabitants deported. Abe Foxman denounced the blog as "outright racism and bigotry," and lamented the congregation's support of Pruzansky. On November 25, 2014, the Orthodox Union issued a public statement distancing itself from Pruzansky's remarks, noting that it could not support a response to terror that includes wholesale demonization of Arabs, collective punishment of Arabs or destruction or dismantling of Muslim holy sites. The OU called on the community to reject the attitude promoted in Pruzansky's essay: "Such rhetoric is wrong and must be repudiated, whether it is voiced by lay leaders, community leaders or rabbis.” Pruzansky's synagogue announced in a letter to the congregation that Pruzansky agreed to have his future blogs reviewed by editors and that the board would periodically review the process. The board has also acted to ensure security for the synagogue is tightened. Pruzansky wrote his own letter to the congregation expressing regret for having written in a way that "many have deemed harsh."

On March 31, 2016, Pruzansky published a blog post titled "A Novel Idea," wherein he dismissed the idea of rape culture on college campuses, blamed a promiscuous culture for many rapes reported in college, and proposed marriage as a solution to the overall issue. The post prompted many angry responses, in which Pruzansky was accused of blaming victims of rape, of not taking rape seriously, and of not acknowledging or understanding that marital rape exists. After Pruzansky followed the March 31 blog post with another, on April 13, 2016, entitled "Culture Wars – Update," in which he defended his position and reiterated his arguments and position, the Jewish Orthodox Feminist Alliance responded, demanding that the rabbi be removed from the speaking roster of a one-day conference scheduled to be held at Bnai Yeshurun. The organization's demands were met, and Pruzansky was dropped from the conference. In April 2016, the Rabbinical Council of America decried Pruzansky's position, noting that "while Rabbi Pruzansky raises some important points regarding sexual behavior on college campuses, the RCA rejects the tone and much of the substance of his recent comments regarding rape."

On Nov 9, 2020, Pruzansky published a blog post titled, "The Way Forward," in which he claimed fraud in the 2020 presidential election. The claims included, (a) that election officials filled in blank ballots; (b) that poll watchers were denied access to watching polls, despite court orders; (c) that voters were told to use a writing implement that would disqualify their ballots; (d) that election officials illegally covered the windows of their facilities so they could not be observed; (e) that statistically-impossible numbers of Biden “voters by mail” – in some cases, 100% of vote batches went for Biden; and (f) that computer “glitches” switched thousands of Trump votes to Biden votes.

== Personal ==
Pruzansky is married to the former Karen Hausdorff, who is a speech language pathologist, and has four children, three of whom live in Israel. He made aliyah, or moved to Israel, in 2020 and is now rabbi emeritus of Bnai Yeshurun.
