= Rambam Mesivta =

School in New York

Coordinates: 40°37′00″N 73°43′39″W

- 284 Mott Ave, Lawrence, Nassau County, New York; United States of America

Information
- Type: Private School
- Motto: Torah, Midos, Excellence
- Religious affiliation: Jewish
- Established: 1991
- Sister school: Midreshet Shalhevet (former)
- School district: Lawrence (District 15)
- Faculty: 55
- Grades: 9th - 12th
- Gender: All Male
- Enrollment: 150-200
- Campus type: Suburban
- Colors: Red and Black
- Mascot: Raven, Ram
- Accreditation: Middle States Association of Colleges and Schools
- Newspaper: The Rambam Onion, The Rambam Reverie, Rambam Record, Hamasmid
- Website: http://www.rambam.org

Rambam Mesivta is a private Jewish High School in Lawrence, New York. Rambam Mesivta was founded in 1991, designed with an all-boys Mesivta program that offers classes in religious Jewish studies and college preparatory studies. Graduates have matriculated at universities including University of Pennsylvania, Harvard University, Stanford University,Yale University, Princeton University, Columbia University, Brown University, Dartmouth College, and Cornell University.

Rav Zev Meir Friedman serves as Rosh HaMesivta and Rabbi Yotav Eliach (author of Judaism, Zionism, and the Land of Israel) serves as Principal. Eliach is the son of former David Eliach (former principal of Yeshiva of Flatbush High School) and Yaffa Eliach (noted historian and author).

== History ==
Rambam Mesivta was founded in 1992.

In 2006 Rambam Mesivta entered into a partnership with longtime rival HAFTR High School, called the "Torah Institute". This move was intended to pool resources and to raise the standard of religious education in HAFTR and secular education in Rambam. It also helped create Rambam's sister school, the now-defunct Midreshet Shalhevet. This deal ended partially due to the 2008 financial crisis and was due to a large deficit Shalhevet created. This was a result of increased distribution of need-based scholarships. In the end, HAFTR refused to fund the deficit thus ending the deal. Shalhevet though was able to cover the deficit through a fundraising campaign and was able to remain open.

In 2020 due in part to the COVID-19 pandemic, the sister school Shalhevet was forced to close permanently.

In the fall of 2022, just after the beginning of the school year, Rambam Mesivta moved to a newly built facility in Lawrence.

== Awards and recognitions ==
Rambam Mesivta was honored with the National Blue Ribbon School Award of Excellence in 2015 and 2021 for its high scholastic performance, as measured by SAT scores and other standardized tests, as well as its incredibly high level of daily attendance and nearly 100% graduation rate.

Rambam was the second yeshiva on Long Island to have ever been honored with this prestigious award and the only one in the state to win it twice. Out of a possible 13,300 public, private, and parochial schools that could apply for the award, only 39 Jewish, yeshivas, or community schools have qualified to date.

== Athletics ==
Rambam Mesivta has multiple athletic teams including hockey, basketball, flag football, soccer, tennis, and softball.

Rambam's strongest sport is currently hockey, as the Varsity team has made it to the playoffs several times during the past decade, most recently in the 2021–2022 season. However, historically, Rambam has also achieved notable milestones in other sports. In 1997, the Rambam varsity basketball team won the MYHSAL championship, defeating Flatbush in the championship game at the Meadowlands Arena. Rambam's varsity basketball team also won Yeshiva University's Saracheck Tournament Tier I championship in both 1996 and 1997, defeating YULA in the championship game in consecutive years. And on the baseball diamond, Rambam's varsity softball team won MYHSAL championships in both 1996 and 1997.

== Academic Teams ==
Rambam Mesivta has multiple academic teams that compete in local and national competitions, of both secular and Judaic nature. Rambam's current strongest academic teams include the Robotics team (FIRST Tech Challenge, RobocupJr. USA), the Rambam Rashis Torah Bowl Team, Yeshiva League Chess team, the Mock Trial team, and the Debate Team, as well as their College Bowl Team.

== Activism ==
Rambam Mesivta is notable for encouraging its student body to be involved with "Jewish activism and political awareness".

Congresswomen Kathleen M. Rice, in recognizing the school for achieving the Blue Ribbon award, stated as follows:
"within days of the 2004 earthquake and tsunami in Southeast Asia, which killed more than 250,000 people, students from Rambam Mesivta raised more than $6,000 to help rebuild schools and buy school supplies in Sri Lanka. Following the tragic 2014 terrorist attack at the Har Nof synagogue in Jerusalem, in which four Jewish worshipers were killed, a group of 10th graders from Rambam Mesivta responded immediately with a campaign to raise money for the victims' families. Within a day of the attack, the students had raised nearly $20,000, and within 10 days, they raised over one million. Nearly two months after they launched their campaign, this passionate and caring group of students raised over two million dollars."

Students at Rambam were among the picketers in front of the Polish consulate in NY to protest Polish action against a historian documenting Polish collusion with the Nazis during WWII. The protest led to a meeting between the dean of the high school, Rabbi Friedman, and the Polish consul-general, Urszula Gacek, attempting to find common ground. In the end, they were successful and Jakiw Palij was deported to Germany.

== Staff ==
- Rosh HaYeshiva – Rabbi Zev M. Friedman
- Rosh HaMesivta – Rabbi Avi Herschman
- Principal – Doctor Hillel Goldman
- Principal Emeritus – Rabbi Yotav Eliach (author of Judaism, Zionism, and the Land of Israel)
- Assistant Principal – Rabbi Avi Haar
- Director of Student Activities – Rabbi Yitz Milworn
- Director of Israel Guidance – Rabbi Ilan Schimmel
- Director of College Guidance – Mrs. Marcy Farrel (On leave of absence; Current College Guidance: Yitzy Laster)
- Athletic Director – Jeff Bieder
- Master of Chambers; Procter – Avrumi Weinberger
- Director of Information Technology – Yoni Gross

== See also ==
- Hebrew Academy of the Five Towns and Rockaways
- Davis Renov Stahler Yeshiva High School for Boys
- Plainview – Old Bethpage John F. Kennedy High School
