= Mesivta Ohel Torah =

Jewish high school in the US

Location
- 91 College Road, Monsey, New York; United States
- 41.123091°N 74.086943°W

Information
- Other name: Yeshiva High School of Monsey
- Type: Non-public
- Religious affiliation: Orthodox Judaism
- Established: 1987
- School district: East Ramapo Central School District
- Grades: 9 – 12
- Gender: Male
- Enrollment: 109

Mesivta Ohel Torah (lit. 'Tent of Torah'), also known as Yeshiva High School of Monsey is an Orthodox Jewish yeshiva in Monsey, New York, United States.

== History ==
Ohel Torah was founded in 1987 by Shmuel Rosengarten—a grandson of Chaim Pinchas Scheinberg—and Gabriel Bodenheimer. During the school's planning stage, a local resident opposed the granting of a variance for a proposed dormitory. As part of the response to this opposition, Hershy Itzkowitz backed a proposal to carve out a new village in this area, to be called Highview Heights—a motion that failed.

== Description ==
The school is located in the College and Carlton neighborhood of the unincorporated place of Monsey, in the New York State town of Ramapo. Located at 91 College Road, the school has 109 students. It is primarily set up as two divisions; "Mesivta" (9th-11th grade) and "Bais Medrash" (12th grade and up).

== See also ==
- List of mesivtas (Jewish secondary schools)
