= Stella K. Abraham High School for Girls =

Orthodox Jewish girls school in Long Island

Location
- 291 Meadowview Avenue; Hewlett Bay Park, NY 11557; 40°38′12″N 73°41′41″W

Information
- Type: Private, secondary
- Established: 1992
- NCES School ID: A9503087
- Principal: Elisheva Kaminetsky and Bluma Drebin
- Faculty: N/A (Note: "N/A" means the data are not available or not applicable.)
- Grades: 9-12
- Enrollment: 354 (as of 2023-24)
- Student to teacher ratio: N/A
- Accreditation: New York State Association of Independent Schools
- Website: skahalb.org

Stella K. Abraham (SKA) High School for Girls is a Modern Orthodox Jewish day school for grades 9–12, located in Hewlett Bay Park in Nassau County, New York, United States.

The high school is part of the Hebrew Academy of Long Beach; its counterpart for male students is the Davis Renov Stahler Yeshiva High School for Boys. Academics at the school focuses both on the Limudei Kodesh (Torah studies) curriculum and in secular non-Jewish studies.

== History ==
In 1992, the Hebrew Academy purchased the former Lawrence Country Day School 9.2-acre (37,000 m^{2}) campus in 1992 for $2.2 million. After several residents objected to the sale, the village of Hewlett Bay Park moved to acquire the property by eminent domain. In response, the school filed a $55 lawsuit alleging antisemitism and sought to prevent the village from acquiring the property. After nearly two years, a compromise was reached allowing the school to operate but limiting its size and the suit was dropped.

Founded as the Yeshiva High School for Girls at Hewlett Bay Park, it was renamed for longtime resident Stella K. Abraham in 1994.

In 2001, students Shira Billet and Dora Sosnowik were the team gold medal national winners of the Siemens Competition, a science competition for US high school students.

== See also ==
- List of high schools in New York
