= Elliot Schrier =

American Modern Orthodox Rabbi

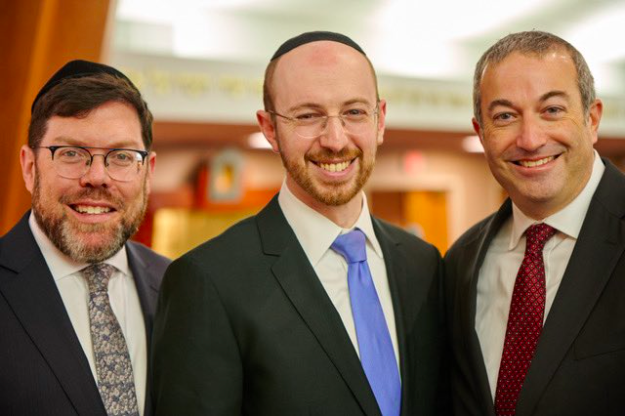
- Rabbi Elliot Schrier (center) with Rabbis Menachem Penner (left) and Ari Berman (right) at Schrier's installation as the Rabbi of Congregation Bnai Yeshurun

Personal life
- Born: October 10, 1989 (age 36)
- Children: 5
- Education: Davis Renov Stahler Yeshiva High School for Boys, Yeshivat Har Etzion, Yeshiva University

Religious life
- Religion: Judaism
- Denomination: Modern Orthodox

Jewish leader
- Predecessor: Steven Pruzansky
- Position: Senior Rabbi
- Synagogue: Congregation Bnai Yeshurun
- Residence: Teaneck, NJ
- Semikhah: Rabbi Isaac Elchanan Theological Seminary

Elliot Schrier (Hebrew: חנוך העניך שרייער; born October 10, 1989) is an American Modern Orthodox Rabbi. He is the current mara d'asra of Congregation Bnai Yeshurun in Teaneck, New Jersey.

== Biography ==
Schrier was born on October 10, 1989. Schrier grew up in Woodmere, New York. He graduated valedictorian of the Davis Renov Stahler Yeshiva High School for Boys (DRS) in 2007. Following high school, Schrier studied at Yeshivat Har Etzion for one year. He advanced into Rabbi Mosheh Lichtenstein’s shiur and would eventually join Rosh HaYeshiva Aharon Lichtenstein’s shiur, an uncommon feat for a Shana Aleph student. He then studied History and Judaic Studies at Yeshiva University. At Rabbi Isaac Elchanan Theological Seminary he studied under Rosh HaYeshiva Rabbi Michael Rosensweig for 6 years and served as a Shoel U’Meishiv for Rosensweig’s shiur.

Schrier was a rabbinic intern at Congregation Beth Sholom, in Lawrence, NY before serving as Rabbi at the Albert Einstein College of Medicine from 2016 to 2021, where he was well regarded for his eloquence, sharp wit, and erudition. At the same time Schrier worked at the North Shore Hebrew Academy High School (he started in fall 2015), where he was the Chairman of the Talmud Department and Director of the Beit Midrash Program, a program created for students seeking a more vigorous Talmud curriculum. He worked there as an instructor of Judaic Studies for 6 years, teaching Talmud and Jewish Philosophy.

Schrier began his work as the Senior Rabbi of Congregation Bnai Yeshurun, Teaneck's founding Orthodox Congregation, in August 2021 at the age of 31. The official installation took place on November 8, 2021. Ari Berman was keynote speaker and quoted Aryeh Lebowitz, Director of Semikhah at Yeshiva University, who taught Schrier during his time at DRS and referred to Schrier as "one of the most brilliant students in the history of DRS."

Along with his installation at Congregation Bnai Yeshurun, Schrier was also appointed a member of the Rabbinical Council of Bergen County (RCBC).

== Personal life ==
Schrier is married to the former Rena Goldstein, who works in an administrative role as associate director at the Hospital for Special Surgery in Manhattan. They live in Teaneck and have 4 sons and a daughter.
