= Shlomo Wahrman =

Torah Scholars

Rabbi Shlomo HaLevi Wahrman

Personal life
- Born: August 1, 1926 Leipzig, Germany
- Died: July 31, 2013 (aged 86) Kew Gardens, Queens, New York City
- Buried: West Babylon, New York
- Spouse: Sarah Malka Herskovitz
- Children: 3
- Occupation: Rabbi; teacher

Religious life
- Religion: Judaism
- Denomination: Orthodox
- Yeshiva: Hebrew Academy of Nassau County
- Position: Rosh HaYeshiva
- Began: 1969
- Ended: 2013 (retired from day-to-day teaching in 1999)
- Residence: Kew Gardens Hills

Shlomo HaLevi Wahrman (Hebrew: שלמה הלוי וואהרמאן; August 1, 1926 – July 31, 2013) was an American Orthodox rabbi. He served as the Rosh HaYeshiva of the Hebrew Academy of Nassau County and also authored thirteen books and hundreds of articles on Jewish law, Talmudic analysis, and Jewish history.

== Early life and education ==
Shlomo Wahrman was born to Rivka and Yosef Wahrman in Leipzig, Germany. In 1939, at the age of twelve, he and his Polish-born parents and siblings were granted visas to come to the United States. Many years later (in 1997), the Shoah Foundation interviewed Wahrman and his wife regarding their experiences before and during World War II. Wahrman himself concluded his book, Lest We Forget: Growing up in Nazi Leipzig 1933-1939, thus:

All these events have delivered a powerful message to me. Any Jewish city anywhere could potentially suffer Leipzig's fate, chas v’shalom. There is no safety and security for us in galut, even in a democracy. The German Weimar Republic was a democracy, yet it could not prevent the emergence of a Hitler. When the anti-Semites so decreed, Leipzig, a city of 18,000 Jews, became Judenrein.

Soon after arriving in New York City, Wahrman's family moved to Cincinnati. There, he developed a close relationship with Eliezer Silver, who Wahrman would later regard as his rav muvhak (foremost teacher). Silver encouraged Wahrman's writing. Wahrman studied at several yeshivas in the United States, including Beth Medrash Govoha in Lakewood, New Jersey.

== Career ==
Wahrman served as the Rosh HaYeshiva at the Hebrew Academy of Nassau County.

== Personal life ==
Wahrman married Sarah Malka Herskovitz, a Holocaust survivor.

== Writings ==
Wahrman wrote over a dozen books and numerous articles published under a pseudonym in various Torah journals. He wrote a series of analyses of Torah topics titled Shearis Yosef. For decades, he contributed to Torah journals including Ohr HaMizrach, HaMaor, HaPardes, and HaDarom.
