= Kesher Israel Congregation (Harrisburg, Pennsylvania) =

Orthodox synagogue in Harrisburg, Pennsylvania

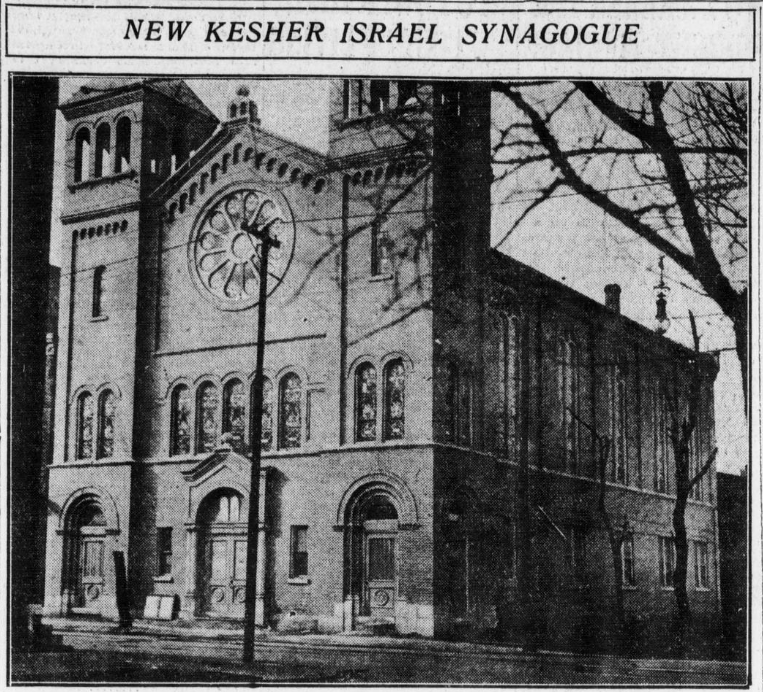
- Synagogue building shortly before its dedication in 1918

- Location in Pennsylvania

Religion
- Affiliation: Orthodox Judaism
- Rite: Nusach Ashkenaz
- Ecclesiastical or organisational status: Synagogue
- Leadership: Rabbi Howard Finkelstein
- Status: Active

Location
- Location: 3200 N. Third Street, Harrisburg, Pennsylvania
- Country: United States
- Coordinates: 40°17′55″N 76°54′00″W

Architecture
- Type: Synagogue
- Style: Modernist
- Established: 1902 (as a congregation)
- Completed: 1949
- Construction cost: $325,000
- Capacity: 800

Website
- kesherisrael.org

Kesher Israel Congregation is an Orthodox synagogue located in the Uptown neighborhood of Harrisburg, Pennsylvania, in the United States. Founded in 1902, the congregation is officially affiliated with the Orthodox Union.

== Name ==
There is some discrepancy about the early name of the congregation. In the annals of the Chisuk Emuna Synagogue, an Orthodox synagogue in Harrisburg from which members split off to form Kesher Israel, the new congregation was called Chasseur Israel. According to a "Golden Book" produced for the congregation's 15th anniversary, the congregation went by the name Keser Israel (Hebrew: כתר ישראל, lit. 'Crown of Israel'). However, a listing of rabbis and Jewish educators in United States colleges, published in the 1917 American Jewish Yearbook, identifies the congregation as "Kesher Israel". One explanation is that the "s" and "sh" sounds were conflated in the Lithuanian Yiddish pronunciation of the time.

== History ==
Kesher Israel was established on October 1, 1902 by breakaway members of Chisuk Emuna B'nai Russia Synagogue. One reason for the split was feuding among synagogue members; another was dissatisfaction with Chisuk Emuna's insistence on maintaining "Old World" Lithuanian synagogue customs in America. For example, Chisuk Emuna conducted all synagogue business in Yiddish rather than English. The breakaway members believed that American culture could and should be integrated into the Orthodox practice of the synagogue. Ironically, Chisuk Emuna would eventually become a Traditional Conservative synagogue, while Kesher Israel remained Orthodox.

For its first synagogue location, Kesher Israel purchased a Baptist mission church (originally the First Free Baptist Church) at Fourth and State Streets, opposite the Pennsylvania State Capitol, for a cost of $11,500. In late 1903, members of the Chevra Talmud Torah (Talmud Torah Society) joined Kesher Israel. From 1910 to 1916 a Hasidic congregation, Machzikei Hadas, held its services in the basement of the Kesher Israel building. Kesher Israel opened a Talmud Torah in 1908 which served all Jewish residents in the city.

The congregation was forced to relocate when the buildings on State Street and throughout the Eighth Ward were razed to make way for the expansion of the Pennsylvania State Capitol Complex. In 1917 the state government paid the congregation $25,000 for its property, and the congregation purchased a lot at Capitol and Briggs Street and hired a Washington, D.C. architect to design a new synagogue. The new structure was dedicated on June 23, 1918. The Moorish Revival exterior was said to resemble that of the Great Synagogue of Pilsen, while the interior design featured an "arched ceiling, indirect lighting system...[and] the Ark and the Bimah were finished in white enamel and gold". The building also sported stained glass windows "with Judaic historical designs". The principal address during the dedication was given by the noted Jewish orator, Rabbi Zvi Hirsch Masliansky. In the evening, a sacred concert was performed by Cantor Josef Rosenblatt and his choir. In 1937 the facade was renovated.

In 1945 the state government decided to further the expansion of the Capitol complex northward and paid Kesher Israel to vacate its property; the congregation received a check for $74,000 on April 11, 1947. In 1948–49 the congregation constructed its third home at North Third and Schuylkill Streets. The $325,000 structure was markedly different from its predecessor, both in its exterior, Modern design – said to convey "the congregation's self-image as 'modern orthodox'" – and its interior design. The bimah (reader's platform) was moved from the center of the room to the front, and the women's section, which formerly occupied a balcony, was situated on the same level as the men's section. The main sanctuary has capacity for 800 worshippers. Many of the stained glass windows on the exterior of the synagogue are re-creations of the windows designed by Rabbi Eliezer Silver for Kesher Israel's second home at Capitol and Briggs Streets.

In 1963 a new wing was added to accommodate a chapel for daily services, a social hall, meeting rooms, kosher kitchens, and offices. The addition brought the total size of the facility to 7,000 square feet (650 m^{2}).

The synagogue building was heavily water-damaged by Hurricane Agnes in June 1972. In 1988 the synagogue was defaced by spray-painted swastikas and the words "Death to the Jews".

By 2010, the exodus of most Jews from the surrounding neighborhood led the synagogue to put up its building for sale and announce its desire to relocate three miles to the north, next to the Jewish Community Center where most of the Jewish population now resides. However, the Orthodox community had grown in the intervening years and as of 2016 the synagogue continued to operate in midtown Harrisburg, about 1 mile (1.6 km) away from the Orthodox neighborhoods.

In 2020 Kesher Israel purchased the former Riverside United Methodist Church on the 3000-block of North 3rd Street.

In August 2020 the synagogue building was again vandalized, with a pair of red swastikas spray-painted at the entrance.

The congregation maintains a section in the cemetery on 34th Street.

== Rabbinic leadership ==
Rabbi Eliezer Silver, as Rav of Harrisburg, served as spiritual leader of Kesher Israel from 1907 to 1925. For the larger community, Silver established a Chevra Shas (Talmud Study Society), a Hebrew Free Loan Society, a Hachnossas Orchim (hospitality) organization, and the Harrisburg Hebrew School.

Rabbi Chaim Ben Zion Notelovitz succeeded Silver as spiritual leader of Kesher Israel from 1925 to 1932. Silver's son, Rabbi David L. Silver, then assumed the pulpit for over 50 years, from 1932 to 1983. The election of the younger Silver broke with tradition in the fact that he was English-speaking and also had a secular as well as traditional Jewish education. He was also clean-shaven. Silver helped found the city's Jewish day school, Yeshiva Academy, a Jewish home for the elderly, and a mikveh.

Silver was succeeded by Rabbi Chaim E. Schertz, whose tenure extended from 1984 to 2008. Schertz was followed in succession by Rabbis Akiva Males, Elisha Friedman, and then Howard Finkelstein, after he retired from his pulpit in Ottawa. There is currently no rabbi.

== Bibliography ==
- Silver, David L. (1997). Silver Linings: A Memoir. Kesher Israel Congregation.
- Kesher Israel Kosher Kitchen. Vol. 2. Kesher Israel Synagogue Sisterhood. 1980.
- From the Kesher Israel Kosher Kitchen. Kesher Israel Congregation Sisterhood.
