= Vince Naimoli =

American businessman (1937-2019)

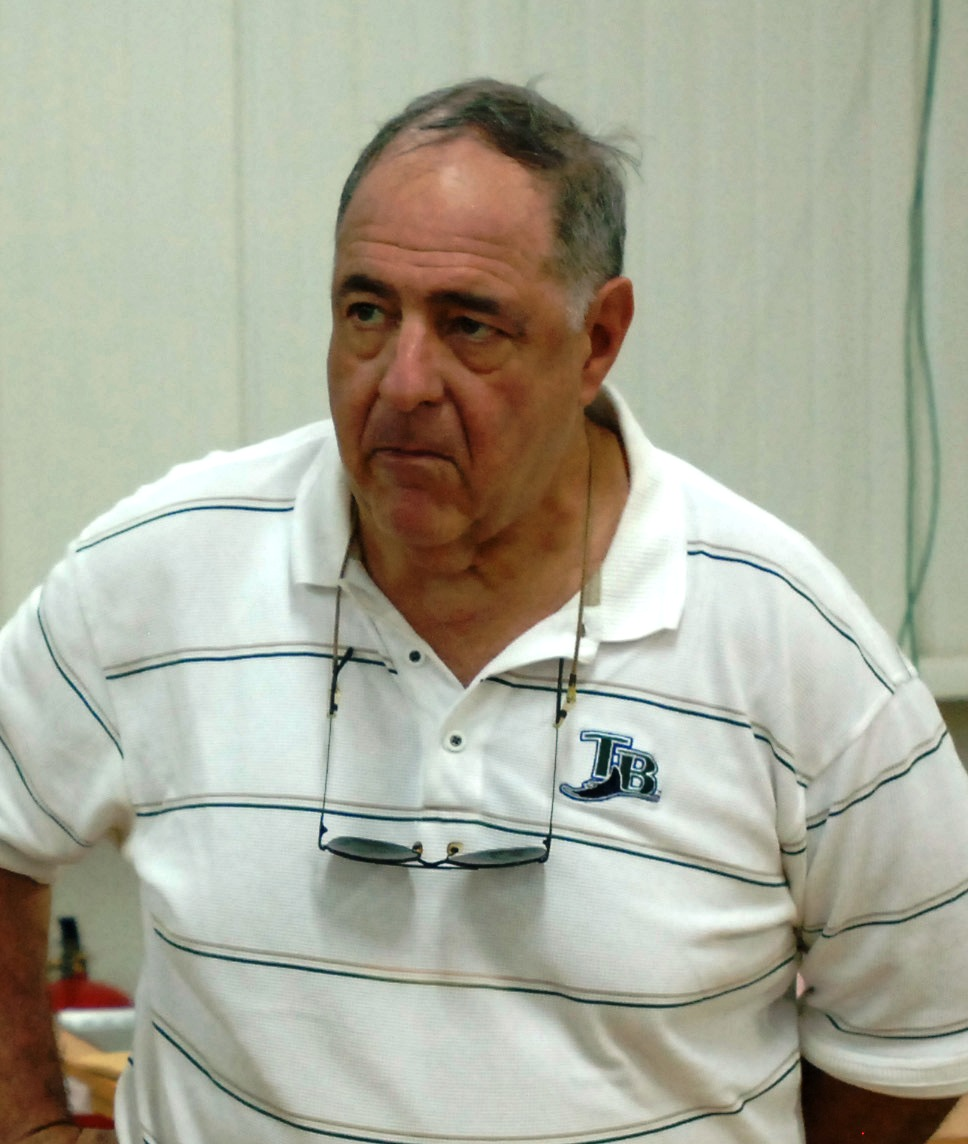
- Naimoli in June 2006
- Born: Vincent Joseph Naimoli; September 16, 1937; Paterson, New Jersey, U.S.
- Died: August 25, 2019 (aged 81); Tampa, Florida, U.S.
- Education: University of Notre Dame; New Jersey Institute of Technology; Fairleigh Dickinson University
- Occupations: Owner of Tampa Bay Devil Rays (MLB), businessman, investor, entrepreneur
- Years active: 1995–2005

Vincent Joseph Naimoli (September 16, 1937 – August 25, 2019) was an American businessman, and the first owner of the Major League Baseball team the Tampa Bay Devil Rays.

== Biography ==
Naimoli's father was an Italian immigrant who worked for the New York City Subway system and became a self-taught stationary engineer. Naimoli was born in Paterson, New Jersey and attended Paterson Central High School. He attended the University of Notre Dame, graduating in 1959 and earning a master's degree in mechanical engineering from New Jersey Institute of Technology in 1962. Naimoli received a Master of Business Administration degree from Fairleigh Dickinson University in 1964, and attended Harvard Business School's six-week advanced management program in 1974.

Until the end of his life, Naimoli attended Fighting Irish athletic events regularly. Naimoli has three daughters from his first marriage, and one daughter from his second marriage.

Naimoli was a member of the Fairleigh Dickinson University Board of Trustees. The Naimoli Family Baseball Complex on the Metropolitan Campus of Fairleigh Dickinson University was dedicated on October 5, 2011.

== Tampa Bay Devil Rays ==
The regions of Tampa and St. Peterberg had made a push for baseball for many years, ranging from trying to relocate the Chicago White Sox to a failed push for the 1991 expansion bids. In 1990, the Florida Suncoast Dome opened. As such, Naimoli, leader of the Tampa Bay Baseball Group, had originally tried to bring baseball to the region by buying the San Francisco Giants from Bob Lurie for $115 million that would play in the region in 1993. However, the move failed when the National League forced Lurie to try to find a local buyer, which they narrowly did with Peter Magowan for $100 million. He tried to buy the Seattle Mariners and move them to Tampa, but also failed.

On March 20, 1995, Naimoli became the owner of a new expansion team granted by Major League Baseball for play in the 1998 season, which became christened as the Tampa Bay Devil Rays after originally thinking about naming them the Sting Rays before finding out a winter league team had the name. He hired Chuck LaMar as general manager and Larry Rothschild as the first manager.

Naimoli negotiated a naming-rights deal with Tropicana Products that saw the Suncoast Dome renamed Tropicana Field. It had been built to early 1990s MLB specifications, but Naimoli and the team had to pay for upgrades to the stadium and other auxiliary facilities. Naimoli oversaw a remodeling of the stadium with asymmetrical outfield dimensions, a full dirt infield, and seats located close to the field of play. FieldTurf was added before the start of the 2000 season. The team was a perpetual failure on the field, never winning 80 games in any season with Naimoli as owner. He owned the team until he sold it to a group led by Stuart Sternberg in 2004 and then stepped down after the 2005 season ended. The team rebranded to Rays in 2008 and promptly had their first winning season.

== Thriftiness ==
Naimoli was known for running the Rays very cheaply. He refused to purchase internet access and an email system for the Rays to keep costs down, as he felt email was a fad. His thriftiness also manifested itself via a strict ban on outside food at Tropicana Field. This caused a furor when an elderly woman with diabetes was prevented from bringing food into the park to regulate her sugar levels. As a result, the woman had to sit in her tour bus for the duration of the game.

He once charged a high school band admission to play the national anthem, and went so far as to not do business with companies that did not buy season tickets.

Naimoli had been attempting to sell his 10-acre mansion in the elite Avila community for at least three years to move into a smaller property.

== Philanthropy ==
As a long-time resident of Tampa, Naimoli received the very first "Bridging the Bay" award in 1996, recognizing him as the individual who has done the most to unite the citizens of Hillsborough and Pinellas counties. He also received similar community service awards from the Urban League, the Jewish National Fund, the Tampa Sports Club, Boys and Girls Clubs and the Multiple Sclerosis Society. He received an honorary monogram from the Notre Dame Monogram Club in 1999.

Naimoli, who received an MBA in 1964 from Fairleigh Dickinson University, contributed $1 million in 2007 to be used towards the construction of a baseball complex at his alma mater. The gift paid for the 2011 construction of the Naimoli Family Baseball Complex on FDU's Teaneck, New Jersey campus.

In 2006, Naimoli made a contribution of $5 million to his undergraduate alma mater, the University of Notre Dame, to be used towards a $24.7 million renovation project of the Edmund P. Joyce Center, an 11,418-seat multi-purpose arena that is used by the school's basketball and volleyball teams. A 16,500-square-foot (1,530 m^{2}) club / hospitality area which will include concession stands and restrooms, designed to accommodate 750 spectators, will be named for the Naimoli family.

In 2009, Naimoli donated towards the construction of the Naimoli Family Athletic and Recreational Facility at New Jersey Institute of Technology. The facility will be approximately 25,600 square feet (2,380 m^{2}), housing courts for tennis, and will be made available for other athletic and recreational activities.

Naimoli also claimed to have made many more millions of dollars' worth of "anonymous donations" to various charities.

== Death ==
Naimoli was diagnosed with progressive supranuclear palsy in 2014 and died on August 25, 2019, at the age of 81.
