= Yeshivat Shaare Torah =

- ישיבת שערי תורה

Location
- 1680 Coney Island Avenue (boys' elementary school); 1202 Avenue P (boys' high school); 222 Ocean Parkway (girls' elementary school); 1768 Ocean Avenue (girls' high school); Brooklyn, New York; United States
- 40°36′59″N 73°57′50″W

Information
- Type: Private
- Established: 1982; 44 years ago
- Rosh Yeshiva: Rabbi Hillel Haber
- Head master: Richard Altabie
- Grades: Pre-kindergarten–12th grade
- Enrollment: Approximately 1,400
- Colors: Blue and white
- Athletics: Basketball, flag football, softball, hockey
- Nickname: Stars
- Status: 501(c)(3) nonprofit organization
- Tax ID No.: 11-2613334
- Website: yeshivatshaaretorah.com

Yeshivat Shaare Torah (more popularly known as Shaare Torah or just Shaare) is a 501(c)(3) non-profit organization that operates five Sephardic private Jewish day school programs located in Brooklyn, New York, United States. It includes single-gender elementary schools and high schools for boys and girls. In 2017, the boys' high school had 309 students and the girls' high school had 120 students. The organization also operates a preschool program for 60 children.

== Teaching philosophy ==
Shaare Torah is affiliated philosophically with Orthodox Judaism.

== Student demographics ==
Shaare Torah primarily caters to the Sephardic Jewish community of Brooklyn, but also has students from around the Tri-State area.

== After high school graduation ==
Graduates are encouraged to participate in year-long programs at yeshivot and seminaries in Israel. Afterwards, some continue their studies in similar institutions, while others enroll in university, or go straight into the workforce. Some of the most popular universities among Shaare alumni, such as Brooklyn College and Baruch College, grant up to one year's worth of credit to students who study in Israel, allowing them to apply these credits to their undergraduate degree. It is also increasingly common for graduates to join a Kollel, following Yeshiva education.

== History ==
In 2009, 34 students at the girl's elementary school were injured when a sidewalk grate collapsed during a graduation ceremony. The girl's elementary school has about 300 students. That same year, the school closed due to the swine flu epidemic.

In 2015, the school hosted a political rally promoting tax credits for parents of children in private schools. New York Governor Andrew Cuomo spoke at the event, as did City Council Member David G. Greenfield.

On June 4, 2024 the girls high school went on a trip in Hewitt, NJ. On the way a tree branch fell down, smashing the windows of a monsey tours coach bus carrying around 60 passengers, critically injuring 2, and leaving many girls with minor injuries.

== Athletics ==
The boys' high school has athletic teams competing in softball, basketball, and flag football. The school is a member of the Metropolitan Yeshiva High School Athletic League.

== Leadership ==
The rosh yeshiva of Shaare Torah is Hillel Haber, a Syrian Jew raised in Brooklyn. Haber, who had previously moved to Israel for 14 years to further his study of Torah at Yeshivat Kol Yaakov, returned to Brooklyn to found Shaare Torah.
