= Naimoli Family Baseball Complex =

Baseball venue in Teaneck, New Jersey

- Interactive map of Naimoli Family Baseball Complex
- Location: New Jersey Route 4 and River Road; Teaneck, New Jersey, USA
- Coordinates: 40.901102°N 74.028097°W
- Owner: Fairleigh Dickinson University
- Operator: Fairleigh Dickinson University
- Capacity: 500
- Surface: FieldTurf
- Scoreboard: Electronic
- Field size: 321 ft. (LF); 375 ft. (LCF); 370 ft. (CF); 360 ft. (RCF); 321 ft. (RF)

Construction
- Built: 2011
- Opened: April 8, 2011

Tenants
- Fairleigh Dickinson Knights baseball (NCAA DI NEC) (2011-present); Heschel Heat (Yeshiva League Western Division) (2011-Present)

The Naimoli Family Baseball Complex is a baseball venue in Teaneck, New Jersey. It is home to the Fairleigh Dickinson Knights baseball team of the NCAA Division I Northeast Conference. The facility is named for the family of Vince Naimoli, a Fairleigh Dickinson alumnus. Built in 2011, the facility has a capacity of 500 spectators.

== History ==
The field was built prior to the 2011 season. In 2007, its namesake, Vince Naimoli, donated $1 million for the facility's construction. Naimoli graduated from Fairleigh Dickinson in 1964 and was the first principal owner of the Tampa Bay Devil Rays.

The complex hosted its first game on April 8, 2011, in which Fairleigh Dickinson lost to Long Island 3–1. The field was not completed until partway through the season, and the team hosted games at a variety of venues during the first part of the 2011 season.

== See also ==
- List of NCAA Division I baseball venues
