= Moshe Gottesman =

American rabbi (1932–2018)

Rabbi Dr. Moshe Gottesman
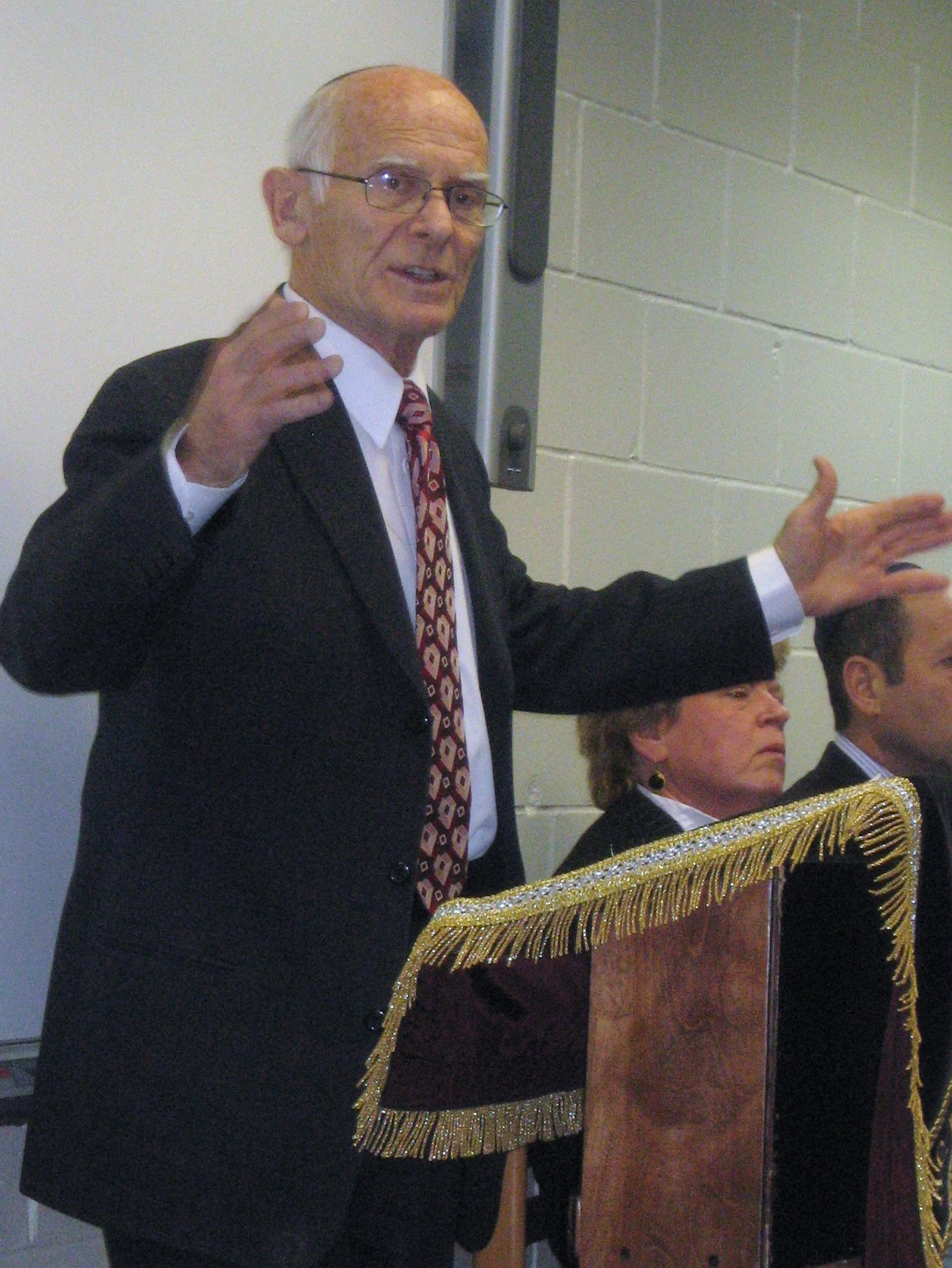
- Rabbi Gottesman speaking at the dedication of the Gottesman Beit Midrash at HANC

Personal life
- Born: July 18, 1932 Welland, Ontario
- Died: December 3, 2018 (aged 86)
- Buried: Eretz HaChaim Cemetery, Israel
- Spouse: Sondra Gottesman
- Education: Ida Crown Jewish Academy, Hebrew Theological College, Honorary doctorate from Yeshiva University

Religious life
- Religion: Judaism
- Denomination: Orthodox Religious Zionist

Jewish leader
- Position: Dean Emeritus
- Yeshiva: Hebrew Academy of Nassau County
- Yahrtzeit: 26 Kislev (Chanuka, Day 2)
- Residence: Oceanside, New York
- Semikhah: Hebrew Theological College

Rabbi Moshe Gottesman was born in Canada and has worked in Israel, Chicago and Long Island, New York. He held the position of dean for the Hebrew Academy of Nassau County for almost 20 years. Gottesman was also the director of tours for Camp Sdei Chemed International for over 35 years. Gottesman has received many awards, including, the Honorary Doctor of Divinity degree from Yeshiva University.

== Education ==
Gottesman received his formal education and semicha in Chicago, Illinois, where he studied secular studies at the Chicago Jewish Academy (which is now known as Ida Crown Jewish Academy) and Judaic studies at the Hebrew Theological College (HTC). While studying at the HTC, his main rabbinic influences included Rabbis Yisrael Mendel Kaplan and Chaim Kreiswirth.

== Hebrew Academy of Nassau County ==
=== Dean ===
Gottesman's tenure at the Hebrew Academy of Nassau County (HANC) began in 1960. After a year of teaching in Chicago, he began work as rabbi for the original campus in West Hempstead. Gottesman went on to become a teacher, principal of the Junior and Senior High School and Dean in 1985.

=== Post-retirement ===
Although officially retired, he still devoted much of his time to HANC. In December 2010, HANC dedicated its new Beit Midrash in his honor. The goal of the Rabbi Moshe Gottesman Beit Midrash is to be a center of learning for students and alumni from HANC as well people who either work or study in nearby communities and schools like Hofstra University and Nassau Community College

Every year, Gottesman led HANC in their march at the annual Salute to Israel Day Parade in New York City.

== Gottesman Learning Center ==
While dean at HANC, Gottesman established the Gottesman Learning Center for children with special needs. The program currently accommodates children with everything from basic learning disabilities to Down syndrome and various types of autism. The program meets each Sunday morning and provides a Jewish education with davening, the aleph-bet, laws and customs, song, dance, art, parashah and crafts to children who, because of their special requirements, would have no other opportunity to be in a Jewish school environment.

== Young Israel of Oceanside Mikva ==
For over 25 years the community of Oceanside, New York, did not have a mikvah. In 1984, Gottesman was determined. Neighbors took the religious community to a court zoning board over the building permit. Gottesman and twenty five 12th grade HANC students attended the hearing. Gottesman used his students as a visual aid to show the judge how many people would use the mikva if granted a permit. The judge granted permission and dismissed the case.
