= List of high schools in New York =

List of high schools in New York may refer to:

- List of high schools in New York (state)
- List of high schools in New York City
