= Tha (Javanese) =

Syllable in the Javanese script

tha
- ꦛ
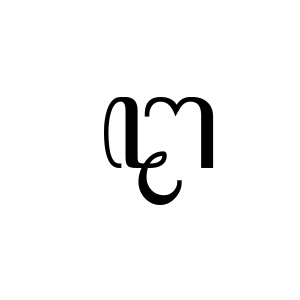
- Aksara nglegena

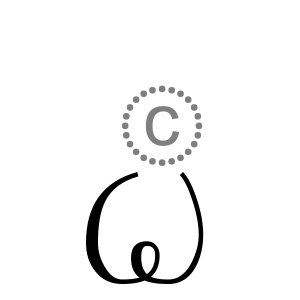
- Aksara pasangan

Usage
- Writing system: Javanese script
- Latin orthography: tha
- Sound values: [ṭ]
- In Unicode: A99B

ꦛ is a syllable in the Javanese script that represents the sounds /ʈɔ/, /ʈa/. It is transliterated to Latin as "tha", and sometimes in Indonesian orthography as "tho". It has another form (pasangan), which is ◌꧀ꦛ, but represented by a single Unicode code point, U+A99B.

== Pasangan ==
Its pasangan form ◌꧀ꦛ, is located on the bottom side of the previous syllable.

== Murda ==
The letter ꦛ doesn't have a murda form.

== Mahaprana ==
Mahaprana letters were originally aspirated consonants used in Sanskrit and Kawi transliterations. However, there are no aspirated consonants in modern Javanese. The mahaprana form of ꦛ is ꦜ.

== Glyphs ==
Nglegena forms				Pasangan forms			
ꦛ tha	ꦛꦃ thah	ꦛꦁ thang	ꦛꦂ thar	◌꧀ꦛ -tha	◌꧀ꦛꦃ -thah	◌꧀ꦛꦁ -thang	◌꧀ꦛꦂ -thar
ꦛꦺ the	ꦛꦺꦃ theh	ꦛꦺꦁ theng	ꦛꦺꦂ ther	◌꧀ꦛꦺ -the	◌꧀ꦛꦺꦃ -theh	◌꧀ꦛꦺꦁ -theng	◌꧀ꦛꦺꦂ -ther
ꦛꦼ thê	ꦛꦼꦃ thêh	ꦛꦼꦁ thêng	ꦛꦼꦂ thêr	◌꧀ꦛꦼ -thê	◌꧀ꦛꦼꦃ -thêh	◌꧀ꦛꦼꦁ -thêng	◌꧀ꦛꦼꦂ -thêr
ꦛꦶ thi	ꦛꦶꦃ thih	ꦛꦶꦁ thing	ꦛꦶꦂ thir	◌꧀ꦛꦶ -thi	◌꧀ꦛꦶꦃ -thih	◌꧀ꦛꦶꦁ -thing	◌꧀ꦛꦶꦂ -thir
ꦛꦺꦴ tho	ꦛꦺꦴꦃ thoh	ꦛꦺꦴꦁ thong	ꦛꦺꦴꦂ thor	◌꧀ꦛꦺꦴ -tho	◌꧀ꦛꦺꦴꦃ -thoh	◌꧀ꦛꦺꦴꦁ -thong	◌꧀ꦛꦺꦴꦂ -thor
ꦛꦸ thu	ꦛꦸꦃ thuh	ꦛꦸꦁ thung	ꦛꦸꦂ thur	◌꧀ꦛꦸ -thu	◌꧀ꦛꦸꦃ -thuh	◌꧀ꦛꦸꦁ -thung	◌꧀ꦛꦸꦂ -thur
ꦛꦿ thra	ꦛꦿꦃ thrah	ꦛꦿꦁ thrang	ꦛꦿꦂ thrar	◌꧀ꦛꦿ -thra	◌꧀ꦛꦿꦃ -thrah	◌꧀ꦛꦿꦁ -thrang	◌꧀ꦛꦿꦂ -thrar
ꦛꦿꦺ thre	ꦛꦿꦺꦃ threh	ꦛꦿꦺꦁ threng	ꦛꦿꦺꦂ threr	◌꧀ꦛꦿꦺ -thre	◌꧀ꦛꦿꦺꦃ -threh	◌꧀ꦛꦿꦺꦁ -threng	◌꧀ꦛꦿꦺꦂ -threr
ꦛꦽ thrê	ꦛꦽꦃ thrêh	ꦛꦽꦁ thrêng	ꦛꦽꦂ thrêr	◌꧀ꦛꦽ -thrê	◌꧀ꦛꦽꦃ -thrêh	◌꧀ꦛꦽꦁ -thrêng	◌꧀ꦛꦽꦂ -thrêr
ꦛꦿꦶ thri	ꦛꦿꦶꦃ thrih	ꦛꦿꦶꦁ thring	ꦛꦿꦶꦂ thrir	◌꧀ꦛꦿꦶ -thri	◌꧀ꦛꦿꦶꦃ -thrih	◌꧀ꦛꦿꦶꦁ -thring	◌꧀ꦛꦿꦶꦂ -thrir
ꦛꦿꦺꦴ thro	ꦛꦿꦺꦴꦃ throh	ꦛꦿꦺꦴꦁ throng	ꦛꦿꦺꦴꦂ thror	◌꧀ꦛꦿꦺꦴ -thro	◌꧀ꦛꦿꦺꦴꦃ -throh	◌꧀ꦛꦿꦺꦴꦁ -throng	◌꧀ꦛꦿꦺꦴꦂ -thror
ꦛꦿꦸ thru	ꦛꦿꦸꦃ thruh	ꦛꦿꦸꦁ thrung	ꦛꦿꦸꦂ thrur	◌꧀ꦛꦿꦸ -thru	◌꧀ꦛꦿꦸꦃ -thruh	◌꧀ꦛꦿꦸꦁ -thrung	◌꧀ꦛꦿꦸꦂ -thrur
ꦛꦾ thya	ꦛꦾꦃ thyah	ꦛꦾꦁ thyang	ꦛꦾꦂ thyar	◌꧀ꦛꦾ -thya	◌꧀ꦛꦾꦃ -thyah	◌꧀ꦛꦾꦁ -thyang	◌꧀ꦛꦾꦂ -thyar
ꦛꦾꦺ thye	ꦛꦾꦺꦃ thyeh	ꦛꦾꦺꦁ thyeng	ꦛꦾꦺꦂ thyer	◌꧀ꦛꦾꦺ -thye	◌꧀ꦛꦾꦺꦃ -thyeh	◌꧀ꦛꦾꦺꦁ -thyeng	◌꧀ꦛꦾꦺꦂ -thyer
ꦛꦾꦼ thyê	ꦛꦾꦼꦃ thyêh	ꦛꦾꦼꦁ thyêng	ꦛꦾꦼꦂ thyêr	◌꧀ꦛꦾꦼ -thyê	◌꧀ꦛꦾꦼꦃ -thyêh	◌꧀ꦛꦾꦼꦁ -thyêng	◌꧀ꦛꦾꦼꦂ -thyêr
ꦛꦾꦶ thyi	ꦛꦾꦶꦃ thyih	ꦛꦾꦶꦁ thying	ꦛꦾꦶꦂ thyir	◌꧀ꦛꦾꦶ -thyi	◌꧀ꦛꦾꦶꦃ -thyih	◌꧀ꦛꦾꦶꦁ -thying	◌꧀ꦛꦾꦶꦂ -thyir
ꦛꦾꦺꦴ thyo	ꦛꦾꦺꦴꦃ thyoh	ꦛꦾꦺꦴꦁ thyong	ꦛꦾꦺꦴꦂ thyor	◌꧀ꦛꦾꦺꦴ -thyo	◌꧀ꦛꦾꦺꦴꦃ -thyoh	◌꧀ꦛꦾꦺꦴꦁ -thyong	◌꧀ꦛꦾꦺꦴꦂ -thyor
ꦛꦾꦸ thyu	ꦛꦾꦸꦃ thyuh	ꦛꦾꦸꦁ thyung	ꦛꦾꦸꦂ thyur	◌꧀ꦛꦾꦸ -thyu	◌꧀ꦛꦾꦸꦃ -thyuh	◌꧀ꦛꦾꦸꦁ -thyung	◌꧀ꦛꦾꦸꦂ -thyur

== Unicode block ==
Javanese script was added to the Unicode Standard in October, 2009 with the release of version 5.2.

Javanese^{[1]}^{[2]} Official Unicode Consortium code chart (PDF)
	0	1	2	3	4	5	6	7	8	9	A	B	C	D	E	F
U+A98x	ꦀ	ꦁ	ꦂ	ꦃ	ꦄ	ꦅ	ꦆ	ꦇ	ꦈ	ꦉ	ꦊ	ꦋ	ꦌ	ꦍ	ꦎ	ꦏ
U+A99x	ꦐ	ꦑ	ꦒ	ꦓ	ꦔ	ꦕ	ꦖ	ꦗ	ꦘ	ꦙ	ꦚ	ꦛ	ꦜ	ꦝ	ꦞ	ꦟ
U+A9Ax	ꦠ	ꦡ	ꦢ	ꦣ	ꦤ	ꦥ	ꦦ	ꦧ	ꦨ	ꦩ	ꦪ	ꦫ	ꦬ	ꦭ	ꦮ	ꦯ
U+A9Bx	ꦰ	ꦱ	ꦲ	꦳	ꦴ	ꦵ	ꦶ	ꦷ	ꦸ	ꦹ	ꦺ	ꦻ	ꦼ	ꦽ	ꦾ	ꦿ
U+A9Cx	꧀	꧁	꧂	꧃	꧄	꧅	꧆	꧇	꧈	꧉	꧊	꧋	꧌	꧍		ꧏ
U+A9Dx	꧐	꧑	꧒	꧓	꧔	꧕	꧖	꧗	꧘	꧙					꧞	꧟
Notes 1.As of Unicode version 17.0 2.Grey areas indicate non-assigned code points

== See also ==
- Ṭa (Indic)
