= Hebrew Academy of Long Beach =

- South Shore, Long Island, New York

Information
- Religious affiliation: Judaism
- Denomination: Modern Orthodox Judaism
- Established: 1954; 72 years ago
- Founder: Rabbi Armin H. Friedman
- Head of school: Adam Englander
- Enrollment: 1,700
- Website: halb.org

Hebrew Academy of Long Beach (HALB) is a Modern Orthodox Jewish day school located on the South Shore of Long Island in New York. Its founding principal was Rabbi Armin H. Friedman in 1954. The name refers back to the presence in Long Beach which ended after its West Broadway location was closed in 2017.

It contains five schools:

- Lev Chana Preschool - (preschool and kindergarten) in Hewlett Bay Park
- HALB Elementary School - (Grades 1–8) previously in Long Beach and now in Woodmere (Split into a Lower School (Grades 1-5), and Middle School (Grades 6-8))
- SKA - Stella K. Abraham High School for Girls in Hewlett Bay Park
- DRS - Davis Renov Stahler Yeshiva High School for Boys in Woodmere
- Yeshivat Lev Shlomo - for post-high school students who wish to continue their Jewish education. Located in the DRS building.

The HALB Elementary School and DRS buildings also serve as a Jewish day camp in the summer called Avnet. Avnet runs on Monday through Friday.

HALB Elementary School moved into the building where School Number Six was previously located during March of the 2016–17 school year.

== History ==
The Hebrew Academy of Long Beach was founded in 1954, its founding principal was Rabbi Armin H. Friedman. The HALB began implementing a blended learning model in its classrooms based on Bloom's taxonomy, as well as social and emotional learning (SEL) training for teachers. As of March 2022, HALB enrolled 1,700 students in its schools.
