= Hebrew Academy of San Francisco =

Jewish day school in San Francisco

Coordinates: 37.7762°N 122.4729°W

Hebrew Academy of San Francisco was a private Jewish day school, operating in San Francisco, California, from 1969 to 2016. It was founded by Rabbi Pinchas Lipner, and had the only Orthodox Jewish high school in San Francisco during that time. From 2005 onward, it was known as Lisa Kampner Hebrew Academy.

== History ==
In the late 1940s, a school named the San Francisco Hebrew Academy was founded by Rabbi Bernard Marton. It closed a few years later.

Rabbi Pinchas Lipner founded the day school in 1969 after moving to San Francisco from Chicago. The opening day enrollment was 53 students from nursery to third grade. In 1970, enrollment reached 150 students up to fourth grade. The school initially was on 26th Avenue in the Richmond District, sharing its campus with Congregation Chevra Thilim. By 1983, enrollment was 180 students through tenth grade. A proposal was made to create a facility to accommodate 240 students through twelfth grade.

In 1987, it moved to its own new building on 14th Avenue, In 1987, Lipner was awarded the Jerusalem Prize from the Torah Education and Culture Department of the World Zionist Organization for "building the academy virtually from the ground up and providing an important link with the state of Israel." In 1990, it graduated its first high school senior class with 13 students.

In 2005, the school was renamed the Lisa Kampner Hebrew Academy, after one of its major contributors, Stanley Kampner, had reported that his daughter Lisa, who was an alumna of the school, had died the previous year in her early thirties.

In 2016, after Lipner retired and moved to Israel, the school closed down due to lack of funding. It was described as San Francisco's only Orthodox Jewish school, and the building in 2018 was taken over by the Stratford Schools in Northern California.

== School structure and curriculum ==
The school provided a full Jewish and secular education to its students. Many of those students were recent immigrants from the Soviet Union, and they received both ESL training as well as significant scholarships. Once the high school opened in 1986, it also offered dormitory service for out-of-town students, and hosted students from other cities in California, as well as Mexico and Panama.

== Activism ==
The Hebrew Academy encouraged strong support for Israel. Many prominent politicians came to visit the school, and the school regularly brought Israeli teachers, as well as representatives from the youth movement Bnei Akiva, to educate the students

The leadership of the school often took an active role in promoting various political causes, such as school vouchers and the Soviet Jewry movement. In 1985, Lipner and other teachers from the school flew to Germany to protest Ronald Reagan's visit to the Bitburg cemetery.

=== Institute for Jewish Medical Ethics ===
As founder and head of the Institute for Jewish Medical Ethics in San Francisco, Lipner would host annual international conferences on Jewish medical ethics at the school, with such experts as Immanuel Jakobovits, Moshe Tendler, and J. David Bleich.

== Funding and legal issues ==
The Hebrew Academy struggled to get funding from local Jewish agencies. They challenged both the Jewish Federation and the Koret Foundation for fair funding. In 2002, Lipner and the school sued local philanthropist Richard Goldman and the Jewish Federation over defamatory comments made by Goldman concerning him and the school. The libel suit was dismissed in 2004 as California's one-year statute of limitations for libel had run out, as Goldman had made those comments in an interview in 1992 and which was posted to the UC Berkeley Bancroft Library archives in 1993, "nine years before he filed suit", but was appealed in 2005, and was eventually dismissed by the state Supreme Court in 2007. For the 2004-2005 school year, the school reported it had lost funding from the Koret Foundation of two scholarship positions without explanation.

== Notable people ==
=== Faculty ===
- Edward Teller, nuclear physicist
- Yaacov Agam, Israeli artist
- N. Scott Momaday, novelist
- Jack Sarfatti, theoretical physicist

=== Alumni ===
- Kira Soltanovich, comedian
- Kira Makagon, entrepreneur, CEO and founder of NebuAd
- Igor Olshansky, NFL player
- David Fohrman, author, lecturer, founder of the Torah media company, Aleph Beta
