= Troy Housing Authority =

Agency overview
- Formed: April 12, 1944
- Jurisdiction: Troy, New York
- Headquarters: 1 Eddys Lane, Troy, NY 12180
- Website: troyhousing.org

The Troy Housing Authority (THA) is a public agency of the city of Troy, New York that provides subsidized public housing to low- and moderate-income families and individuals, and is the pass-through agency for funding from various housing-related federal programs.

== History ==
The THA was established on April 12, 1944, by an act of the New York State Legislature, following a 1937 survey conducted by students at Russell Sage College. That survey had collected data on 900 buildings in three areas of the city. During interviews, students learned that many families were living in housing lacking sanitary facilities, that had rat infestations, flooded when it rained, and – in some cases – were still using oil for lighting.

Shortly after the THA was created, the need for low-cost housing increased as veterans returned from World War II. To accommodate this influx, more than 800 units were built, and those returning were given preference when applying for assistance. Many of these units were in newly built towers, such as the John P. Taylor apartments along River Street in the city's downtown. When completed in the 1950s, the Taylor Apartments provided housing for 278 families, offering waterfront views and grassy areas.

During the 1960s and 70s the THA—alongside most other public housing agencies—took on additional roles and responsibilities. The Fair Housing Act of 1968 prohibited racial discrimination in the housing market and gave the United States Department of Housing and Urban Development (HUD) greater responsibility and increased funding. In Troy, this resulted in THA constructing approximately 500 more units. Funding increased again in the 1970s, following the Housing and Community Development Act of 1974, and led to the construction of 140 more units. This act also established Section 8 Rental Assistance, enabling low-income households to receive rental assistance while living in private apartments that meet HUD housing quality standards. In order to offer this assistance to Troy residents, the administration of THA initiated a Section 8 program shortly after the bill was made law.

In the 1980s, dollowing the passage of the McKinney-Vento Homeless Assistance Act, the THA became the passthrough agency for funds supporting emergency shelter, transitional housing, job training, primary health care, education, and permanent housing at local shelters.

In 1992, following a multi-year federal study of dilapidated public housing, Congress established the HOPE VI program to ease demolition and disposal of severely distressed public housing. As of March 2020, the THA had received HOPE VI funding to demolish and dispose of a single public housing project.

In April 2019, the THA revealed that they were seeking a developer to demolish two deteriorating 10-story towers at the John P. Taylor Apartment complex in downtown Troy, both of which had been vacant for more than a decade. The post-war brick-and-cinder towers, known as Buildings 1 and 2, had been considered for renovation, but the agency balked at the approximately $16 million price tag. The cost to demolish the buildings, which together have 143 apartments, was estimated at only about $2 million. The THA would be financing the demolition through HOPE VI federal funding.

In October 2019, the THA and the Troy Local Development Corporation announced the selection of Pennrose, LLC, a Philadelphia-based affordable housing developer to redevelop the site, outbidding five other firms that submitted bids in June 2019. The initial plan—devised by the THA, TLDC and Pennrose—provided for affordable and market-rate apartments, office, and retail space. Buildings 1 and 2 would be demolished and replaced by two smaller, mixed-use buildings. Taylor residents would then be moved out of Buildings 3 and 4. Those towers would be demolished and replaced with new housing and commercial space. The preliminary design includes urban-style elements such as first-floor storefronts and brick facades. The sides facing the river will have courtyards, balconies and elevated gardens.

== Programs & Developments ==
In the federal government model of HUD, THA is a public housing agency.

As of March 2020, the THA manages 1,110 apartments supported by the HUD Rental Assistance Demonstration (RAD) Program. The THA also administers 944 Housing Choice Vouchers, 134 are based at Kennedy Towers, 28 are at the Tapestry-on-the-Hudson development and 19 are set aside for households with a non-elderly person with a disability. All remaining vouchers are tenant-based, meaning they can be in any apartment that meets housing quality standards at a reasonable rent, as defined by HUD guidelines. The THA also administers subsidy for 30 single room occupancy apartments at the YWCA of the Greater Capital Region.

THA also funds a range of services to the homeless at area shelters including emergency shelter, transitional housing, job training, primary health care, education and some permanent housing. These services are provided in affiliation with Joseph's House, Unity House, Catholic Charities and the YWCA of the Greater Capital Region (as of March 2020).
