= Ṭha =

Letter "Ṭha" in Indic scripts

Example glyphs
- Bengali–Assamese: Ṭha
- Tibetan: ཋ
- Thai: ฐ
- Malayalam: ഠ
- Sinhala: ඨ
- Ashoka Brahmi: Ṭha
- Devanagari: Ṭha

Cognates
- Hebrew: ט
- Greek: Θ
- Cyrillic: Ѳ

Properties
- Phonemic representation: /ʈʰ/ /tʰ/^{B}
- IAST transliteration: ṭh Ṭh
- ISCII code point: BE (190)
- ^B in most non-Indian languages

Ṭha (also romanized as Ttha) is a consonant of Indic abugidas. In modern Indic scripts, Ṭha is derived from the early "Ashoka" Brahmi letter after having gone through the Gupta letter. As with the other cerebral consonants, ṭha is not found in most scripts for Tai, Sino-Tibetan, and other non-Indic languages, except for a few scripts, which retain these letters for transcribing Sanskrit religious terms.

Aryabhata used Devanagari letters for numbers, very similar to the Greek numerals, even after the invention of Indian numerals. The values of the different forms of ठ are:

- ठ [ʈʰə] = 12 (१२)
- ठि [ʈʰɪ] = 1,200 (१२००)
- ठु [ʈʰʊ] = 120,000 (१ २० ०००)
- ठृ [ʈʰri] = 12,000,000 (१ २० ०० ०००)
- ठॢ [ʈʰlə] = 1,200,000,000 (१ २० ०० ०० ०००)
- ठे [ʈʰe] = 12×10^{10} (१२×१०^{१०})
- ठै [ʈʰɛː] = 12×10^{12} (१२×१०^{१२})
- ठो [ʈʰoː] = 12×10^{14} (१२×१०^{१४})
- ठौ [ʈʰɔː] = 12×10^{16} (१२×१०^{१६})

== Historic Ttha ==
There are three different general early historic scripts - Brahmi and its variants, Kharoṣṭhī, and Tocharian, the so-called slanting Brahmi. Ttha as found in standard Brahmi, was a simple geometric shape, and did not vary much throughout the centuries. The Tocharian Ttha did not have an alternate Fremdzeichen form. The third form of ttha, in Kharoshthi was probably derived from Aramaic separately from the Brahmi letter.

=== Brahmi Ttha ===
The Brahmi letter, Ttha, is probably derived from the altered Aramaic Teth, and is thus related to the modern Greek Theta. Several identifiable styles of writing the Brahmi Ttha can be found, most associated with a specific set of inscriptions from an artifact or diverse records from an historic period. As the earliest and most geometric style of Brahmi, the letters found on the Edicts of Ashoka and other records from around that time are normally the reference form for Brahmi letters, with vowel marks not attested until later forms of Brahmi back-formed to match the geometric writing style.

Brahmi Ttha historic forms
Ashoka (3rd-1st c. BCE)	Girnar (~150 BCE)	Kushana (~150-250 CE)	Gujarat (~250 CE)	Gupta (~350 CE)

=== Tocharian Ttha ===
The Tocharian letter is derived from the Brahmi, but does not have an alternate Fremdzeichen form.

Tocharian Ttha with vowel marks
Ttha	Tthā	Tthi	Tthī	Tthu	Tthū	Tthr	Tthr̄	Tthe	Tthai	Ttho	Tthau	Tthä

=== Kharoṣṭhī Ttha ===
The Kharoṣṭhī letter is generally accepted as being derived from the altered Aramaic Taw, and is thus related to T and Tau.

== Devanagari Ṭha ==
Ṭha (ठ) is a consonant of the Devanagari abugida. It ultimately arose from the Brahmi letter, after having gone through the Gupta letter. Letters that derive from it are the Gujarati letter ઠ, and the Modi letter 𑘙.

=== Devanagari-using Languages ===
In all languages, ठ is pronounced as [ʈʰə] or [ʈʰ] when appropriate. Like all Indic scripts, Devanagari uses vowel marks attached to the base consonant to override the inherent /ə/ vowel:

Devanagari ठ with vowel marks
Ṭha	Ṭhā	Ṭhi	Ṭhī	Ṭhu	Ṭhū	Ṭhr	Ṭhr̄	Ṭhl	Ṭhl̄	Ṭhe	Ṭhai	Ṭho	Ṭhau	Ṭh
ठ	ठा	ठि	ठी	ठु	ठू	ठृ	ठॄ	ठॢ	ठॣ	ठे	ठै	ठो	ठौ	ठ्

=== Conjuncts with ठ ===
Devanagari exhibits conjunct ligatures, as is common in Indic scripts. In modern Devanagari texts, most conjuncts are formed by reducing the letter shape to fit tightly to the following letter, usually by dropping a character's vertical stem, sometimes referred to as a "half form". Some conjunct clusters are always represented by a true ligature, instead of a shape that can be broken into constituent independent letters. Vertically stacked conjuncts are ubiquitous in older texts, while only a few are still used routinely in modern Devanagari texts. Lacking a vertical stem to drop for making a half form, Ṭha either forms a stacked conjunct/ligature, or uses its full form with Virama. The use of ligatures and vertical conjuncts may vary across languages using the Devanagari script, with Marathi in particular avoiding their use where other languages would use them.

==== Ligature conjuncts of ठ ====
True ligatures are quite rare in Indic scripts. The most common ligated conjuncts in Devanagari are in the form of a slight mutation to fit in context or as a consistent variant form appended to the adjacent characters. Those variants include Na and the Repha and Rakar forms of Ra. Nepali and Marathi texts use the "eyelash" Ra half form for an initial "R" instead of repha.

- Repha र্ (r) + ठ (ṭʰa) gives the ligature rṭʰa: ^{note}

- Eyelash र্ (r) + ठ (ṭʰa) gives the ligature rṭʰa:

- ठ্ (ṭʰ) + rakar र (ra) gives the ligature ṭʰra:

- प্ (p) + ठ (ṭʰa) gives the ligature pṭʰa:

- ष্ (ṣ) + ठ (ṭʰa) gives the ligature ṣṭʰa:

- ष্ (ṣ) + ठ্ (ṭʰ) + य (ya) gives the ligature ṣṭʰya:

- ठ্ (ṭʰ) + य (ya) gives the ligature ṭʰya:

==== Stacked conjuncts of ठ ====
Vertically stacked ligatures are the most common conjunct forms found in Devanagari text. Although the constituent characters may need to be stretched and moved slightly in order to stack neatly, stacked conjuncts can be broken down into recognizable base letters, or a letter and an otherwise standard ligature.

- छ্ (cʰ) + ठ (ṭʰa) gives the ligature cʰṭʰa:

- ढ্ (ḍʱ) + ठ (ṭʰa) gives the ligature ḍʱṭʰa:

- ड্ (ḍ) + ठ (ṭʰa) gives the ligature ḍṭʰa:

- द্ (d) + ठ (ṭʰa) gives the ligature dṭʰa:

- ङ্ (ŋ) + ठ (ṭʰa) gives the ligature ŋṭʰa:

- ठ্ (ṭʰ) + ब (ba) gives the ligature ṭʰba:

- ठ্ (ṭʰ) + भ (bʰa) gives the ligature ṭʰbʰa:

- ठ্ (ṭʰ) + च (ca) gives the ligature ṭʰca:

- ठ্ (ṭʰ) + छ (cʰa) gives the ligature ṭʰcʰa:

- ठ্ (ṭʰ) + द (da) gives the ligature ṭʰda:

- ठ্ (ṭʰ) + ड (ḍa) gives the ligature ṭʰḍa:

- ठ্ (ṭʰ) + ढ (ḍʱa) gives the ligature ṭʰḍʱa:

- ठ্ (ṭʰ) + ध (dʱa) gives the ligature ṭʰdʱa:

- ठ্ (ṭʰ) + ग (ga) gives the ligature ṭʰga:

- ठ্ (ṭʰ) + घ (ɡʱa) gives the ligature ṭʰɡʱa:

- ठ্ (ṭʰ) + ह (ha) gives the ligature ṭʰha:

- ठ্ (ṭʰ) + ज (ja) gives the ligature ṭʰja:

- ठ্ (ṭʰ) + झ (jʰa) gives the ligature ṭʰjʰa:

- ठ্ (ṭʰ) + ज্ (j) + ञ (ña) gives the ligature ṭʰjña:

- ठ্ (ṭʰ) + क (ka) gives the ligature ṭʰka:

- ठ্ (ṭʰ) + ख (kʰa) gives the ligature ṭʰkʰa:

- ठ্ (ṭʰ) + क্ (k) + ष (ṣa) gives the ligature ṭʰkṣa:

- ठ্ (ṭʰ) + ल (la) gives the ligature ṭʰla:

- ठ্ (ṭʰ) + ळ (ḷa) gives the ligature ṭʰḷa:

- ठ্ (ṭʰ) + म (ma) gives the ligature ṭʰma:

- ठ্ (ṭʰ) + न (na) gives the ligature ṭʰna:

- ठ্ (ṭʰ) + ङ (ŋa) gives the ligature ṭʰŋa:

- ठ্ (ṭʰ) + ण (ṇa) gives the ligature ṭʰṇa:

- ठ্ (ṭʰ) + ञ (ña) gives the ligature ṭʰña:

- ठ্ (ṭʰ) + प (pa) gives the ligature ṭʰpa:

- ठ্ (ṭʰ) + फ (pʰa) gives the ligature ṭʰpʰa:

- ठ্ (ṭʰ) + स (sa) gives the ligature ṭʰsa:

- ठ্ (ṭʰ) + श (ʃa) gives the ligature ṭʰʃa:

- ठ্ (ṭʰ) + ष (ṣa) gives the ligature ṭʰṣa:

- ठ্ (ṭʰ) + त (ta) gives the ligature ṭʰta:

- ठ্ (ṭʰ) + थ (tʰa) gives the ligature ṭʰtʰa:

- ठ্ (ṭʰ) + ट (ṭa) gives the ligature ṭʰṭa:

- ठ্ (ṭʰ) + ठ (ṭʰa) gives the ligature ṭʰṭʰa:

- ठ্ (ṭʰ) + व (va) gives the ligature ṭʰva:

- ट্ (ṭ) + ठ (ṭʰa) gives the ligature ṭṭʰa:

== Bengali Ttha ==
The Bengali script ঠ is derived from the Siddhaṃ, and is marked by a similar horizontal head line, but less geometric shape, than its Devanagari counterpart, ठ. The inherent vowel of Bengali consonant letters is /ɔ/, so the bare letter ঠ will sometimes be transliterated as "ttho" instead of "ttha". Adding okar, the "o" vowel mark, gives a reading of /t̳ʰo/. Like all Indic consonants, ঠ can be modified by marks to indicate another (or no) vowel than its inherent "a".

Bengali ঠ with vowel marks
ttha	tthā	tthi	tthī	tthu	tthū	tthr	tthr̄	tthe	tthai	ttho	tthau	tth
ঠ	ঠা	ঠি	ঠী	ঠু	ঠূ	ঠৃ	ঠৄ	ঠে	ঠৈ	ঠো	ঠৌ	ঠ্

=== ঠ in Bengali-using languages ===
ঠ is used as a basic consonant character in all of the major Bengali script orthographies, including Bengali and Assamese.

=== Conjuncts with ঠ ===
Bengali ঠ exhibits conjunct ligatures, as is common in Indic scripts. Conjunct ligatures with ঠ are all based on the ঠ glyph, with little to no alteration aside from the addition of marks suggesting the conjoining letter.

- ণ্ (ṇ) + ঠ (ṭʰa) gives the ligature ṇṭʰa:

- ণ্ (ṇ) + ঠ্ (ṭʰ) + য (ya) gives the ligature ṇṭʰya, with the ya phala suffix:

- ন্ (n) + ঠ (ṭʰa) gives the ligature nṭʰa:

- ষ্ (ṣ) + ঠ (ṭʰa) gives the ligature ṣṭʰa:

- ষ্ (ṣ) + ঠ্ (ṭʰ) + য (ya) gives the ligature ṣṭʰya, with the ya phala suffix:

== Gujarati Ṭha ==
Gujarati Ṭha.

Ṭha (ઠ) is the twelfth consonant of the Gujarati abugida. It is derived from the Devanagari Ṭha with the top bar (shiro rekha) removed, and ultimately the Brahmi letter.

=== Gujarati-using Languages ===
The Gujarati script is used to write the Gujarati and Kutchi languages. In both languages, ઠ is pronounced as [ʈʰə] or [ʈʰ] when appropriate. Like all Indic scripts, Gujarati uses vowel marks attached to the base consonant to override the inherent /ə/ vowel:

Ṭha	Ṭhā	Ṭhi	Ṭhī	Ṭhu	Ṭhū	Ṭhr	Ṭhl	Ṭhr̄	Ṭhl̄	Ṭhĕ	Ṭhe	Ṭhai	Ṭhŏ	Ṭho	Ṭhau	Ṭh
Gujarati Ṭha syllables, with vowel marks in red.

=== Conjuncts with ઠ ===
Gujarati ઠ exhibits conjunct ligatures, much like its parent Devanagari Script. While most Gujarati conjuncts can only be formed by reducing the letter shape to create a "half form" that fits tightly to following letter, Ṭha does not have a half form. A few conjunct clusters can be represented by a true ligature, instead of a shape that can be broken into constituent independent letters, and vertically stacked conjuncts can also be found in Gujarati, although much less commonly than in Devanagari. Lacking a half form, Ṭha will normally use an explicit virama when forming conjuncts without a true ligature. True ligatures are quite rare in Indic scripts. The most common ligated conjuncts in Gujarati are in the form of a slight mutation to fit in context or as a consistent variant form appended to the adjacent characters. Those variants include Na and the Repha and Rakar forms of Ra.

- ર્ (r) + ઠ (ʈʰa) gives the ligature RṬha:

- ઠ્ (ʈʰ) + ર (ra) gives the ligature ṬhRa:

- ઠ્ (ʈʰ) + ઠ (ʈʰa) gives the ligature ṬhṬha:

- ટ્ (ʈ) + ઠ (ʈʰa) gives the ligature ṬṬha:

- ષ્ (ʂ) + ઠ (ʈʰa) gives the ligature ṢṬha:

== Telugu Ṭha ==
Telugu independent and subjoined Ṭha.

Ṭha (ఠ) is a consonant of the Telugu abugida. It ultimately arose from the Brahmi letter. It is closely related to the Kannada letter ಠ. Most Telugu consonants contain a v-shaped headstroke that is related to the horizontal headline found in other Indic scripts, although headstrokes do not connect adjacent letters in Telugu. The headstroke is normally lost when adding vowel matras. Telugu conjuncts are created by reducing trailing letters to a subjoined form that appears below the initial consonant of the conjunct. Many subjoined forms are created by dropping their headline, with many extending the end of the stroke of the main letter body to form an extended tail reaching up to the right of the preceding consonant. This subjoining of trailing letters to create conjuncts is in contrast to the leading half forms of Devanagari and Bengali letters. Ligature conjuncts are not a feature in Telugu, with the only non-standard construction being an alternate subjoined form of Ṣa (borrowed from Kannada) in the KṢa conjunct.

== Malayalam Ṭha ==
Malayalam letter Ṭha

Ṭha (ഠ) is a consonant of the Malayalam abugida. It ultimately arose from the Brahmi letter, via the Grantha letter Ttha. Like in other Indic scripts, Malayalam consonants have the inherent vowel "a", and take one of several modifying vowel signs to represent syllables with another vowel or no vowel at all.

Malayalam Ttha matras: Ttha, Tthā, Tthi, Tthī, Tthu, Tthū, Tthr̥, Tthr̥̄, Tthl̥, Tthl̥̄, Tthe, Tthē, Tthai, Ttho, Tthō, Tthau, and Tth.

=== Conjuncts of ഠ ===
As is common in Indic scripts, Malayalam joins letters together to form conjunct consonant clusters. There are several ways in which conjuncts are formed in Malayalam texts: using a post-base form of a trailing consonant placed under the initial consonant of a conjunct, a combined ligature of two or more consonants joined together, a conjoining form that appears as a combining mark on the rest of the conjunct, the use of an explicit candrakkala mark to suppress the inherent "a" vowel, or a special consonant form called a "chillu" letter, representing a bare consonant without the inherent "a" vowel. Texts written with the modern reformed Malayalam orthography, put̪iya lipi, may favor more regular conjunct forms than older texts in paḻaya lipi, due to changes undertaken in the 1970s by the Government of Kerala.

- ണ് (ṇ) + ഠ (ṭʰa) gives the ligature ṇṭʰa:

- ഷ് (ṣ) + ഠ (ṭʰa) gives the ligature ṣṭʰa:

== Odia Ṭha ==
Odia independent and subjoined letter Ṭha.

Ṭha (ଠ) is a consonant of the Odia abugida. It ultimately arose from the Brahmi letter, via the Siddhaṃ letter Ttha. Like in other Indic scripts, Odia consonants have the inherent vowel "a", and take one of several modifying vowel signs to represent syllables with another vowel or no vowel at all.

Odia Ttha with vowel matras
Ttha	Tthā	Tthi	Tthī	Tthu	Tthū	Tthr̥	Tthr̥̄	Tthl̥	Tthl̥̄	Tthe	Tthai	Ttho	Tthau	Tth
ଠ	ଠା	ଠି	ଠୀ	ଠୁ	ଠୂ	ଠୃ	ଠୄ	ଠୢ	ଠୣ	ଠେ	ଠୈ	ଠୋ	ଠୌ	ଠ୍

As is common in Indic scripts, Odia joins letters together to form conjunct consonant clusters. The most common conjunct formation is achieved by using a small subjoined form of trailing consonants. Most consonants' subjoined forms are identical to the full form, just reduced in size, although a few drop the curved headline or have a subjoined form not directly related to the full form of the consonant. The second type of conjunct formation is through pure ligatures, where the constituent consonants are written together in a single graphic form. ଠ generates conjuncts only by subjoining and does not form ligatures.

== Kaithi Ṭha ==
Kaithi consonant Ṭha.

Ṭha (𑂘) is a consonant of the Kaithi abugida. It ultimately arose from the Brahmi letter, via the Siddhaṃ letter Ttha. Like in other Indic scripts, Kaithi consonants have the inherent vowel "a", and take one of several modifying vowel signs to represent syllables with another vowel or no vowel at all.

Kaithi Ttha with vowel matras
Ttha	Tthā	Tthi	Tthī	Tthu	Tthū	Tthe	Tthai	Ttho	Tthau	Tth
𑂘	𑂘𑂰	𑂘𑂱	𑂘𑂲	𑂘𑂳	𑂘𑂴	𑂘𑂵	𑂘𑂶	𑂘𑂷	𑂘𑂸	𑂘𑂹

=== Conjuncts of 𑂘 ===
As is common in Indic scripts, Kaithi joins letters together to form conjunct consonant clusters. The most common conjunct formation is achieved by using a half form of preceding consonants, although several consonants use an explicit virama. Most half forms are derived from the full form by removing the vertical stem. As is common in most Indic scripts, conjuncts of ra are indicated with a repha or rakar mark attached to the rest of the consonant cluster. In addition, there are a few vertical conjuncts that can be found in Kaithi writing, but true ligatures are not used in the modern Kaithi script.

- 𑂩୍ (r) + 𑂘 (ṭʰa) gives the ligature rṭʰa:

== Comparison of Ṭha ==
The various Indic scripts are generally related to each other through adaptation and borrowing, and as such the glyphs for cognate letters, including Ṭha, are related as well.

Comparison of Ṭha in different scripts

Aramaic
Kharoṣṭhī 𐨛	Ashoka Brahmi	Kushana Brahmi (Note: The middle "Kushana" form of Brahmi is a later style that emerged as Brahmi scripts were beginning to proliferate. Gupta Brahmi was definitely a stylistic descendant from Kushana, but other Brahmi-derived scripts may have descended from earlier forms.)	Tocharian (Note: Tocharian is probably derived from the middle period "Kushana" form of Brahmi, although artifacts from that time are not plentiful enough to establish a definite succession.)
Gupta Brahmi	Pallava
Kadamba -
Bhaiksuki 𑰙	Siddhaṃ	Grantha 𑌠	Cham -
Sinhala ඨ	Pyu / Old Mon (Note: Pyu and Old Mon are probably the precursors of the Burmese script, and may be derived from either the Pallava or Kadamba script) -
Tibetan ཋ	Newa 𑐛	Ahom -	Malayalam ഠ
Telugu ఠ	Burmese ဌ
Lepcha -	Ranjana	Saurashtra ꢝ	Dives Akuru -
Kannada ಠ	Kayah Li ꤞ
Limbu -	Soyombo (Note: May also be derived from Devangari (see bottom left of table)) 𑩧	Khmer ឋ	Tamil -
Chakma 𑄒	Tai Tham ᨮ
Meitei Mayek -	Gaudi -	Thai ฐ	Lao ຐ
Tai Le -
Marchen -	Tirhuta 𑒚	New Tai Lue -	Tai Viet -	Aksara Kawi
'Phags-pa ꡪ	Odia ଠ	Sharada 𑆜	Rejang -	Batak -	Buginese -
Zanabazar Square 𑨕	Bengali-Assamese	Takri 𑚕	Javanese ꦜ	Balinese ᬞ	Makasar -
Hangul (Note: The Origin of Hangul from 'Phags-pa is one of limited influence, inspiring at most a few basic letter shapes. Hangul does not function as an Indic abugida.) -	Northern Nagari -	Dogri 𑠕	Laṇḍā -	Sundanese -	Baybayin -
Modi 𑘙	Gujarati ઠ	Khojki 𑈕	Khudabadi 𑋇	Mahajani 𑅟	Tagbanwa -
Devanagari	Nandinagari 𑦹	Kaithi	Gurmukhi ਠ	Multani 𑊑	Buhid -
Canadian Syllabics (Note: Although the basic letter forms of the Canadian Aboriginal Syllabics were derived from handwritten Devanagari letters, this abugida indicates vowel sounds by rotations of the letter form, rather than the use of vowel diacritics as is standard in Indic abugidas.) -	Soyombo (Note: May also be derived from Ranjana (see above)) 𑩧	Sylheti Nagari ꠑ	Gunjala Gondi 𑵾	Masaram Gondi (Note: Masaram Gondi acts as an Indic abugida, but its letterforms were not derived from any single precursor script.) 𑴗	Hanuno'o -

== Character encodings of Ṭha ==
Most Indic scripts are encoded in the Unicode Standard, and as such the letter Ṭha in those scripts can be represented in plain text with unique codepoint. Ṭha from several modern-use scripts can also be found in legacy encodings, such as ISCII.

Character information
Preview					ఠ		ଠ		ಠ		ഠ		ઠ		ਠ	
Unicode name	DEVANAGARI LETTER TTHA		BENGALI LETTER TTHA		TELUGU LETTER TTHA		ORIYA LETTER TTHA		KANNADA LETTER TTHA		MALAYALAM LETTER TTHA		GUJARATI LETTER TTHA		GURMUKHI LETTER TTHA	
Encodings	decimal	hex	dec	hex	dec	hex	dec	hex	dec	hex	dec	hex	dec	hex	dec	hex
Unicode	2336	U+0920	2464	U+09A0	3104	U+0C20	2848	U+0B20	3232	U+0CA0	3360	U+0D20	2720	U+0AA0	2592	U+0A20
UTF-8	224 164 160	E0 A4 A0	224 166 160	E0 A6 A0	224 176 160	E0 B0 A0	224 172 160	E0 AC A0	224 178 160	E0 B2 A0	224 180 160	E0 B4 A0	224 170 160	E0 AA A0	224 168 160	E0 A8 A0
Numeric character reference	&#2336;	&#x920;	&#2464;	&#x9A0;	&#3104;	&#xC20;	&#2848;	&#xB20;	&#3232;	&#xCA0;	&#3360;	&#xD20;	&#2720;	&#xAA0;	&#2592;	&#xA20;
ISCII	190	BE	190	BE	190	BE	190	BE	190	BE	190	BE	190	BE	190	BE

Character information
Preview	Ashoka Kushana Gupta		𐨛				𑌠	
Unicode name	BRAHMI LETTER TTHA		KHAROSHTHI LETTER TTHA		SIDDHAM LETTER TTHA		GRANTHA LETTER TTHA	
Encodings	decimal	hex	dec	hex	dec	hex	dec	hex
Unicode	69662	U+1101E	68123	U+10A1B	71065	U+11599	70432	U+11320
UTF-8	240 145 128 158	F0 91 80 9E	240 144 168 155	F0 90 A8 9B	240 145 150 153	F0 91 96 99	240 145 140 160	F0 91 8C A0
UTF-16	55300 56350	D804 DC1E	55298 56859	D802 DE1B	55301 56729	D805 DD99	55300 57120	D804 DF20
Numeric character reference	&#69662;	&#x1101E;	&#68123;	&#x10A1B;	&#71065;	&#x11599;	&#70432;	&#x11320;

Character information
Preview	ཋ		ྛ		ꡪ		𑨕		𑐛		𑰙		𑆜	
Unicode name	TIBETAN LETTER TTHA		TIBETAN SUBJOINED LETTER TTHA		PHAGS-PA LETTER TTHA		ZANABAZAR SQUARE LETTER TTHA		NEWA LETTER TTHA		BHAIKSUKI LETTER TTHA		SHARADA LETTER TTHA	
Encodings	decimal	hex	dec	hex	dec	hex	dec	hex	dec	hex	dec	hex	dec	hex
Unicode	3915	U+0F4B	3995	U+0F9B	43114	U+A86A	72213	U+11A15	70683	U+1141B	72729	U+11C19	70044	U+1119C
UTF-8	224 189 139	E0 BD 8B	224 190 155	E0 BE 9B	234 161 170	EA A1 AA	240 145 168 149	F0 91 A8 95	240 145 144 155	F0 91 90 9B	240 145 176 153	F0 91 B0 99	240 145 134 156	F0 91 86 9C
UTF-16	3915	0F4B	3995	0F9B	43114	A86A	55302 56853	D806 DE15	55301 56347	D805 DC1B	55303 56345	D807 DC19	55300 56732	D804 DD9C
Numeric character reference	&#3915;	&#xF4B;	&#3995;	&#xF9B;	&#43114;	&#xA86A;	&#72213;	&#x11A15;	&#70683;	&#x1141B;	&#72729;	&#x11C19;	&#70044;	&#x1119C;

Character information
Preview	ဌ		ᨮ		ᩛ	
Unicode name	MYANMAR LETTER TTHA		TAI THAM LETTER HIGH RATHA		TAI THAM CONSONANT SIGN HIGH RATHA OR LOW PA	
Encodings	decimal	hex	dec	hex	dec	hex
Unicode	4108	U+100C	6702	U+1A2E	6747	U+1A5B
UTF-8	225 128 140	E1 80 8C	225 168 174	E1 A8 AE	225 169 155	E1 A9 9B
Numeric character reference	&#4108;	&#x100C;	&#6702;	&#x1A2E;	&#6747;	&#x1A5B;

Character information
Preview	ឋ		ຐ		ฐ	
Unicode name	KHMER LETTER TTHA		LAO LETTER PALI TTHA		THAI CHARACTER THO THAN	
Encodings	decimal	hex	dec	hex	dec	hex
Unicode	6027	U+178B	3728	U+0E90	3600	U+0E10
UTF-8	225 158 139	E1 9E 8B	224 186 144	E0 BA 90	224 184 144	E0 B8 90
Numeric character reference	&#6027;	&#x178B;	&#3728;	&#xE90;	&#3600;	&#xE10;

Character information
Preview	ඨ		ꤞ		𑄒		ꢝ	
Unicode name	SINHALA LETTER MAHAAPRAANA TTAYANNA		KAYAH LI LETTER THA		CHAKMA LETTER TTHAA		SAURASHTRA LETTER TTHA	
Encodings	decimal	hex	dec	hex	dec	hex	dec	hex
Unicode	3496	U+0DA8	43294	U+A91E	69906	U+11112	43165	U+A89D
UTF-8	224 182 168	E0 B6 A8	234 164 158	EA A4 9E	240 145 132 146	F0 91 84 92	234 162 157	EA A2 9D
UTF-16	3496	0DA8	43294	A91E	55300 56594	D804 DD12	43165	A89D
Numeric character reference	&#3496;	&#xDA8;	&#43294;	&#xA91E;	&#69906;	&#x11112;	&#43165;	&#xA89D;

Character information
Preview	𑘙		𑦹		𑩧		ꠑ		𑵾			
Unicode name	MODI LETTER TTHA		NANDINAGARI LETTER TTHA		SOYOMBO LETTER TTHA		SYLOTI NAGRI LETTER TTHO		GUNJALA GONDI LETTER TTHA		KAITHI LETTER TTHA	
Encodings	decimal	hex	dec	hex	dec	hex	dec	hex	dec	hex	dec	hex
Unicode	71193	U+11619	72121	U+119B9	72295	U+11A67	43025	U+A811	73086	U+11D7E	69784	U+11098
UTF-8	240 145 152 153	F0 91 98 99	240 145 166 185	F0 91 A6 B9	240 145 169 167	F0 91 A9 A7	234 160 145	EA A0 91	240 145 181 190	F0 91 B5 BE	240 145 130 152	F0 91 82 98
UTF-16	55301 56857	D805 DE19	55302 56761	D806 DDB9	55302 56935	D806 DE67	43025	A811	55303 56702	D807 DD7E	55300 56472	D804 DC98
Numeric character reference	&#71193;	&#x11619;	&#72121;	&#x119B9;	&#72295;	&#x11A67;	&#43025;	&#xA811;	&#73086;	&#x11D7E;	&#69784;	&#x11098;

Character information
Preview	𑒚	
Unicode name	TIRHUTA LETTER TTHA	
Encodings	decimal	hex
Unicode	70810	U+1149A
UTF-8	240 145 146 154	F0 91 92 9A
UTF-16	55301 56474	D805 DC9A
Numeric character reference	&#70810;	&#x1149A;

Character information
Preview	𑚕		𑠕		𑈕		𑋇		𑅟		𑊑	
Unicode name	TAKRI LETTER TTHA		DOGRA LETTER TTHA		KHOJKI LETTER TTHA		KHUDAWADI LETTER TTHA		MAHAJANI LETTER TTHA		MULTANI LETTER TTHA	
Encodings	decimal	hex	dec	hex	dec	hex	dec	hex	dec	hex	dec	hex
Unicode	71317	U+11695	71701	U+11815	70165	U+11215	70343	U+112C7	69983	U+1115F	70289	U+11291
UTF-8	240 145 154 149	F0 91 9A 95	240 145 160 149	F0 91 A0 95	240 145 136 149	F0 91 88 95	240 145 139 135	F0 91 8B 87	240 145 133 159	F0 91 85 9F	240 145 138 145	F0 91 8A 91
UTF-16	55301 56981	D805 DE95	55302 56341	D806 DC15	55300 56853	D804 DE15	55300 57031	D804 DEC7	55300 56671	D804 DD5F	55300 56977	D804 DE91
Numeric character reference	&#71317;	&#x11695;	&#71701;	&#x11815;	&#70165;	&#x11215;	&#70343;	&#x112C7;	&#69983;	&#x1115F;	&#70289;	&#x11291;

Character information
Preview	ᬞ		ꦜ	
Unicode name	BALINESE LETTER TA MURDA MAHAPRANA		JAVANESE LETTER TTA MAHAPRANA	
Encodings	decimal	hex	dec	hex
Unicode	6942	U+1B1E	43420	U+A99C
UTF-8	225 172 158	E1 AC 9E	234 166 156	EA A6 9C
Numeric character reference	&#6942;	&#x1B1E;	&#43420;	&#xA99C;

Character information
Preview	𑴗	
Unicode name	MASARAM GONDI LETTER TTHA	
Encodings	decimal	hex
Unicode	72983	U+11D17
UTF-8	240 145 180 151	F0 91 B4 97
UTF-16	55303 56599	D807 DD17
Numeric character reference	&#72983;	&#x11D17;
