= Davis Renov Stahler Yeshiva High School for Boys =

Jewish day school, high school

Location
- 700 Ibsen Street; Woodmere, New York 11598; United States; 40.6349°N 73.7248°W

Information
- Type: Private, Yeshiva, Day
- Religious affiliation: Jewish
- Denomination: Modern Orthodox
- Established: 1997
- Sister school: Stella K. Abraham High School for Girls
- Menahel (Head): Rabbi Yisroel Kaminetsky
- Grades: 9–12
- Gender: Boys
- Enrollment: 363
- Colors: Green and White
- Mascot: Wildcat
- Accreditation: Middle States Association of Colleges and Schools
- Newspaper: The DRS Star
- Affiliations: Hebrew Academy of Long Beach
- Website: drshalb.org

Davis Renov Stahler Yeshiva High School for Boys (commonly referred to as DRS) is an Orthodox Jewish high school in Woodmere, New York.

== History ==
DRS was established in 1997 as the official high school for Hebrew Academy of Long Beach. Its original building was an old synagogue in Lawrence, New York. In 2002, the school moved to a new building in Woodmere, New York. The first ever Freshman class of the school (Class of 2001) had an enrollment of 27 students. By 2005, the freshman class had 69 students, in 2015 that number went up to 88, and by 2022 that number went up to 100. In 2016, DRS had its accreditation renewed by the Middle States Association.

== Academics ==
DRS is a Orthodox Jewish day school. DRS employs a dual-curriculum in which the students spend half the day studying Jewish subjects and the other half devoted to secular education. The majority of DRS alumni attend college following high school. Many DRS alumni have received rabbinical ordination (“semikhah”) from Rabbi Isaac Elchanan Theological Seminary, including 15 alumni in 2013, and 16 in 2017. DRS as an institution is very pro-Israel. Student coalitions attend AIPAC conventions to lobby politically on behalf of Israel. DRS often hosts Israeli soldiers, including Gilad Shalit, to talk to students. They also hold pro-Israel events including Yom Haatzmaut and Yom Yerushalayim celebrations. DRS offers 15 Advanced Placement classes which students can take for college credit.

=== Lev Shlomo ===
DRS had a post-high school program called Yeshivat Lev Shlomo, started in 2009 for alumni attending colleges that do not offer Judaic studies. Lev Shlomo provides the students with a Judaic studies curriculum and schedule in the morning, so they can attend college classes in the afternoon. It was officially closed in 2016.

== Demographics ==
DRS has about 400 students as of 2025, all of whom are Jewish males from Jewish-Orthodox families. The school is located in Woodmere, New York and is the official high school of Hebrew Academy of Long Beach, but receives students from nineteen feeder schools in Nassau, Suffolk, Queens and Brooklyn Counties. Transportation is provided to students who live further away from the school. A local newspaper claimed that 95% of DRS graduates attend beit medrash (advanced religious studies) after high school and 99% go to Israel for a gap-year.

== Athletics ==
DRS has teams for a variety of sports. Most sports have a single team, while basketball, floor-hockey, and softball have a Junior Varsity team for 9th and 10th graders as well as a Varsity team for 11th and 12th grade. In all, DRS boasts 14 teams which compete in basketball, floor hockey, baseball, bowling, fencing, softball, tennis, wrestling, soccer, flag football, and volleyball. The Varsity hockey team won the championship of the Metropolitan Yeshiva High School Athletic League (MYHSAL) Hockey league in the year 2001 in the school's 4th year of existence. Since then, they have added five more league championships, most recently in 2024. The JV team has won four more. Between the two teams, DRS has had a hockey team in the league finals for 13 consecutive seasons. Floor hockey is a major part of teenage life in the Jewish-metropolitan area and DRS's students take the sport very seriously. The basketball team won its first MYHSAL championship in 2013 and JV won in 2014. In 2016 the Varsity team went undefeated in regular season and tournament play, winning the league championship as well as the Red Sarachek Basketball Tournament. The volleyball team also won its first championship in 2016.

== Notable faculty ==
- Aryeh Lebowitz — Director of Semikhah at Rabbi Isaac Elchanan Theological Seminary

== Notable alumni ==
- Dovid Bashevkin — Director of Education for NCSY
- Elliot Schrier — Rav of Congregation Bnai Yeshurun
