= Tucson Hebrew Academy =

Jewish day school

Location
- 3888 East River Road; Tucson, Arizona 85718; United States
- Coordinates: 32.275266°N 110.909907°W

Information
- Other name: THA
- Type: Private school
- Religious affiliation: Jewish
- Established: 1973
- Founder: Jack Levkowitz
- Head of school: Arthur Yavelberg
- Grades: K–8
- Gender: Co-educational
- Enrollment: 175
- Website: www.thaaz.org

Tucson Hebrew Academy (THA) is a private, co-educational, Jewish day school in Tucson, Arizona, United States.

== History ==
Tucson Hebrew Academy (THA) was founded in 1973 by couples Bertie and Jack Levkowitz, a native of Tucson, Arizona; Betejoy and Arthur Oleisky; and Judy and Dave Leonard. Oleisky, the Conservative rabbi of Congregation Anshei Israel, had decried the lack of a Jewish day school in Tucson during a 1971 Yom Kippur sermon. After the committee balked at the idea of setting up the school according to the tenets of Orthodox Judaism, THA was founded with the intention of accepting students from a wide swath of the local Jewish confessional community, along with setting high standards for general education. The Levkowitzs later served on the school's board of directors. THA's new campus was funded by Payless Shoe Source founder Louis Pozez, and the school is a beneficiary of the Jewish Federation of Southern Arizona.

In a November 2011 ceremony emceed by Richard Carmona and featuring Nevada congresswoman Shelley Berkley as guest speaker, THA board members bestowed the Tikkun Olam (lit. 'Repairing the World') award to congresswoman Gabrielle Giffords. Ron Barber and Stephanie Aaron accepted the award on behalf of Giffords, who was recuperating after having been nearly assassinated in a mass shooting the previous January.

== Enrollment ==
THA is a private school. Student rolls had been in slow decline, with 199 enrolled in the 2001 school year, 196 in 2004 and 175 enrolled in 2011.

== Academics ==
Located at 3888 East River Road in Tucson, THA is an accredited Jewish day school. It received recognition from the National Blue Ribbon Schools Program in 2005. THA regularly hosts STEM fairs, with the Arizona-Sonora Desert Museum, the Pima Air & Space Museum, and the International Dark-Sky Association being among the fifty exhibitors in 2016.

=== Faculty ===
As of July 2021, Johanna Shlomovich is THA's head of school.

== Community ==
THA opened its doors to the Tucson Jewish community for High Holy Days prayer services. The school inaugurated its first Torah scroll on March 17, 1996. The scroll was written in Romania by a Polish-trained sofer (scribe; lit. 'counter') around the time of the end of World War I.

The THA choir was one of two Jewish choirs, along with the Tucson Jewish Youth Choir, which performed at the Tucson Meet Yourself festival.
