= Hebrew Academy of Nassau County =

Coordinates: 40°42′4.0″N 73°38′46.5″W

Location
- 240 Hempstead Ave, West Hempstead, NY 11552 (K-8) 215 Oak St., Uniondale, NY 11553 (High School)

Information
- Type: Private Jewish day school
- Motto: חנך לנער על פי דרכו (Train the youth according to his way)
- Denomination: Modern Orthodox
- Established: 1953
- Founder: Rabbi Meyer Fendel
- Principal: Rabbi Ouriel Hazan (K-8) Rabbi Eli Slomnicki (HS)
- Gender: Co-ed
- Athletics conference: MYHSAL
- Team name: Hurricanes
- Accreditation: Middle States Association of Colleges and Schools
- Newspaper: HANC Happenings
- Website: hanc.org

The Hebrew Academy of Nassau County (HANC) is a K-12, comprehensive, Modern Orthodox Jewish school system, located in Nassau County, New York.

== History ==
In 1953, Nassau County was virtually empty of Jewish education. Through the dedicated efforts of Rabbi Meyer and Goldie Fendel, and a small group of individuals, the vision to establish a Hebrew day school on Long Island was conceived.

HANC’s two (previously four) campuses, the Samuel and Elizabeth Bass Golding Early Childhood Center, Elementary, and Middle School (One building) in West Hempstead, and Brookdale High School in Uniondale, serve more than twelve hundred students, from nursery through high school, who come from fifty communities throughout Long Island and Queens.

After the Fendels made aliyah in 1985, Rabbi Shlomo Wahrman took the helm as principal and Rosh Yeshiva. During this time, Rabbi Moshe Gottesman served as a teacher, dean, and principal at HANC from 1960 until his retirement around 2010. Rabbi Ouriel Hazan became the principal of HANC's West Hempstead campuses in 2021.

In 2021, HANC sold its Plainview campus to the founders of Merkaz Academy, a new yeshiva that operates at this site. HANC also sold its elementary school building at 609 Hempstead Avenue to Young Israel of West Hempstead. In addition to fundraising, proceeds from these sales contributed towards an expanded campus at its Early Childhood Center at 240 Hempstead Avenue, where construction began in June 2024. The campus expansion will consolidate all classes grades K through 8 at one site.

== Notable alumni ==
- Devorah Blachor, author
- Rabbi Menachem Creditor
- Nathan Englander, author
- Alice Feiring
- David M. Friedman (born 1958), United States Ambassador to Israel
- Ari Goldwag, songwriter
- David Harsanyi, writer
- Rabbi Irwin Kula
- Ari Brown, politician
- Nathan Diament, executive director of the Orthodox Union Advocacy Center
- Todd Ant, news/ sports anchor/ reporter at ABC Radio Network
