= Hebrew Academy of the Five Towns and Rockaway =

- HILI

Location
- 389 Central Avenue; Lawrence, New York; United States; 40°37′08″N 73°43′36″W

Information
- Type: Private
- Motto: "Have a Growth Mindset"
- Established: 1978; 48 years ago
- President: Amir Kornblum
- Director: Ari Solomon
- Principal: Joshua Gold (K-8), Naomi Lippman (HS)
- Grades: PreK-12
- Gender: Coed
- Colors: White, Blue, Red
- Mascot: HAWK
- Newspaper: Secular- Tattler, Judaic- HAFTR Haftorah
- Affiliation: Judaism
- Website: haftr.org

The Hebrew Academy of the Five Towns and Rockaway (HAFTR) is a Modern Orthodox Jewish day school on the South Shore of Long Island in New York, United States, serving male and female students in preschool through twelfth grade. It is a private school in the Five Towns.

== History ==
HAFTR was founded in 1978, the result of a merger between two schools on the South Shore of Long Island. Its predecessors were the Hebrew Institute of Long Island in Far Rockaway, Queens, and the Hillel School.

The Hebrew Institute of Long Island served the Rockaway and Five Towns community since about 1936. It was originally known as The Yeshiva of the Rockaways, then located in a synagogue in Averne. A few years later, it took over a children's home on Seagirt Boulevard in Far Rockaway. The school later bought the neighboring Roche estate and United States hotel grounds (which had contained the summer homes of, inter alia, New York State governor Alfred E. Smith, and Manhattan Borough President, Justice Julius Miller), extending the facility to a five-building campus. The high school, founded in 1951, moved into the final campus building in 1953. Yeshiva Darchei Torah took over the old Hebrew Institute campus after the merger.

The Hillel School was founded in Lawrence in 1957.

The foundation of HAFTR provided a co-educational school for Jewish families in the area. In 1980, HAFTR purchased the Number 3 school in Cedarhurst, New York, to house the HAFTR High School.

On January 10, 2019 a fire damaged the HAFTR elementary school campus in Lawrence, New York, and students were temporarily taught at other HAFTR campuses. The campus reopened in April 2019 after the building was renovated.

During the COVID-19 pandemic, the HAFTR schools temporarily ended in-person classes, and later implemented further sanitation protocols to prevent the potential spread of COVID.

The HAFTR High School hosted the 2021 Center for Initiatives in Jewish Education Robotics Tournament.

== Community ==
The school has held annual bone marrow drives. The school is also a participant in the Salute to Israel Parade.

== Academics ==
Approximately 100 students graduate HAFTR annually, 100% of which go on to attend college after graduation. The school has various clubs including ones for robotics, environmental action, sign language and other activities.

== Athletics ==
The academy offers basketball, soccer, hockey, baseball, softball, tennis and volleyball, all for both girls and boys. All HAFTR athletics use the name "The Hawks," though the hockey team formerly competed under the name "The Flames."

== Publications ==
The official student newspaper of HAFTR High School is The Tattler. Established more than 30 years ago, the stories featured in the publication are written, photographed and edited by HAFTR students.

Recently, HAFTR students and rabbinic faculty alike, re-founded the HAFTR Haftorah: A judaic publication, focused around major Jewish holidays and includes Divrei Torah, what's happening around the school, and Judaism inspired art.

== Notable alumni ==
- Robby Berman, wrote the first book ever published on Arabic Idioms in the Palestinian Dialect.
- Paula Eiselt, director of 93QUEEN, a documentary featuring Rachel Freier
- Deborah Lipstadt (HILI), Holocaust historian and expert on antisemitism
- Alana Newhouse (HAFTR), editor of Tablet magazine
- Jacob Steinmetz (HAFTR), first Orthodox-Jewish Major League Baseball-drafted player
- Daniel Wise, mathematician
