= Sobolevo =

Sobolevo (Russian: Соболево) is the name of several rural localities in Russia:

- Sobolevo, Bryansk Oblast, a village in Peklinsky Rural Administrative Okrug of Dubrovsky District in Bryansk Oblast; 53°36′N 33°36′E
- Sobolevo, Ivanovo Oblast, a selo in Yuryevetsky District of Ivanovo Oblast
- Sobolevo, Kaliningrad Oblast, a settlement in Kamensky Rural Okrug of Chernyakhovsky District in Kaliningrad Oblast
- Sobolevo, Kaluga Oblast, a village in Ferzikovsky District of Kaluga Oblast
- Sobolevo, Kamchatka Krai, a selo in Sobolevsky District of Kamchatka Krai
- Sobolevo, Kirov Oblast, a village in Lyumpanursky Rural Okrug of Sanchursky District in Kirov Oblast; 56°57′N 46°57′E
- Sobolevo, Krasnoselsky District, Kostroma Oblast, a village in Priskokovskoye Settlement of Krasnoselsky District in Kostroma Oblast; 57°31′N 41°31′E
- Sobolevo, Ponazyrevsky District, Kostroma Oblast, a village in Khmelevskoye Settlement of Ponazyrevsky District in Kostroma Oblast; 58°24′N 46°23′E
- Sobolevo, Soligalichsky District, Kostroma Oblast, a village in Vasilyevskoye Settlement of Soligalichsky District in Kostroma Oblast; 59°17′N 42°7′E
- Sobolevo, Susaninsky District, Kostroma Oblast, a village in Sumarokovskoye Settlement of Susaninsky District in Kostroma Oblast; 58°12′N 41°42′E
- Sobolevo, Moscow Oblast, a village in Sobolevskoye Rural Settlement of Orekhovo-Zuyevsky District in Moscow Oblast; 55°32′N 38°43′E
- Sobolevo, Chkalovsky District, Nizhny Novgorod Oblast, a village in Kuznetsovsky Selsoviet of Chkalovsky District in Nizhny Novgorod Oblast; 56°44′N 43°14′E
- Sobolevo, Gaginsky District, Nizhny Novgorod Oblast, a selo in Pokrovsky Selsoviet of Gaginsky District in Nizhny Novgorod Oblast; 55°13′N 45°12′E
- Sobolevo, Sokolsky District, Nizhny Novgorod Oblast, a village in Volzhsky Selsoviet of Sokolsky District in Nizhny Novgorod Oblast; 57°23′N 43°22′E
- Sobolevo, Vachsky District, Nizhny Novgorod Oblast, a village in Chulkovsky Selsoviet of Vachsky District in Nizhny Novgorod Oblast; 55°53′N 42°42′E
- Sobolevo, Demyansky District, Novgorod Oblast, a village in Ilyinogorskoye Settlement of Demyansky District in Novgorod Oblast
- Sobolevo, Starorussky District, Novgorod Oblast, a village in Mednikovskoye Settlement of Starorussky District in Novgorod Oblast
- Sobolevo, Orenburg Oblast, a selo in Sobolevsky Selsoviet of Pervomaysky District in Orenburg Oblast
- Sobolevo, Perm Krai, a village in Yusvinsky District of Perm Krai
- Sobolevo, Ryazan Oblast, a selo in Melekshinsky Rural Okrug of Starozhilovsky District in Ryazan Oblast
- Sobolevo, Smolensk Oblast, a village in Sobolevskoye Rural Settlement of Monastyrshchinsky District in Smolensk Oblast
- Sobolevo, Andreapolsky District, Tver Oblast, a village in Andreapolskoye Rural Settlement of Andreapolsky District in Tver Oblast
- Sobolevo, Kimrsky District, Tver Oblast, a village in Fedorovskoye Rural Settlement of Kimrsky District in Tver Oblast
- Sobolevo, Oleninsky District, Tver Oblast, a village in Glazkovskoye Rural Settlement of Oleninsky District in Tver Oblast
- Sobolevo, Vladimir Oblast, a village in Muromsky District of Vladimir Oblast
- Sobolevo, Cherepovetsky District, Vologda Oblast, a village in Yaganovsky Selsoviet of Cherepovetsky District in Vologda Oblast
- Sobolevo, Kirillovsky District, Vologda Oblast, a village in Nikolo-Torzhsky Selsoviet of Kirillovsky District in Vologda Oblast
- Sobolevo, Sheksninsky District, Vologda Oblast, a village in Yurochensky Selsoviet of Sheksninsky District in Vologda Oblast
- Sobolevo, Ustyuzhensky District, Vologda Oblast, a village in Soshnevsky Selsoviet of Ustyuzhensky District in Vologda Oblast
- Sobolevo, Velikoustyugsky District, Vologda Oblast, a village in Verkhnevarzhensky Selsoviet of Velikoustyugsky District in Vologda Oblast
- Sobolevo, Breytovsky District, Yaroslavl Oblast, a village in Sevastyantsevsky Rural Okrug of Breytovsky District in Yaroslavl Oblast
- Sobolevo, Lyubimsky District, Yaroslavl Oblast, a village in Troitsky Rural Okrug of Lyubimsky District in Yaroslavl Oblast
- Sobolevo, Pereslavsky District, Yaroslavl Oblast, a village in Dubrovitsky Rural Okrug of Pereslavsky District in Yaroslavl Oblast

== See also ==
- Sobolewo, disambiguation between places in Poland
