= Sobol (surname) =

Sobol is a surname derived from the Slavic word sobol ("sable"), which may also have been a nickname for a fur trader. As a Yiddish surname, it may be a variant of Sobel, which also derives from sobol. It may refer to:

== People ==
- Anna Sobol-Wejman (born 1946), Polish printmaker
- Artyom Sobol (born 1996), Russian footballer
- Donald J. Sobol (1924–2012), American children's writer
- Eduard Sobol (born 1995), Ukrainian footballer
- Hubert Sobol (born 2000), Polish footballer
- Ilya M. Sobol (1926–2025), Soviet and Russian mathematician
- Jacob Aue Sobol (born 1975), Danish photographer
- Jan Sobol (born 1984), Czech handball player
- Jan Sobol (footballer) (born 1953), Polish footballer
- Jonathan Sobol, Canadian film director and writer
- Kristina Sobol (born 1991), Russian weightlifter
- Louis Sobol (1896–1986), American journalist
- Lyubov Sobol (born 1987), Russian lawyer and politician
- Paul Sobol (1926–2020), Belgian Holocaust survivor
- Richard B. Sobol (1937–2020), American lawyer
- Spiridon Sobol (died 1645), Belarusian printer and educator
- Yehoshua Sobol (born 1939), Israeli playwright and director
- Yuri Sobol (born 1966), Russian footballer
- Soból, nom de guerre of Jan Stanisław Jankowski (1882–1953), Polish politician and member of civil resistance in WWII

== See also ==
- Sobal
- Sobel (disambiguation)
- Sobole (disambiguation)
- Sobolev
- Sobolew (disambiguation)
- Sobolewski
- Sobolevskiy
