= Sobolevsky =

Sobolevsky (Russian: Соболевский, masculine), Sobolevskaya (feminine), or Sobolevskoye (neuter), is a Polish and Belarusian family name related to the word "соболь". It is shared by the following people:

- Pyotr Sobolevsky (1904–1977), Soviet actor

It may also refer to:

- Sobolevsky District, a district of Kamchatka Krai, Russia
- Sobolevsky (rural locality) (Sobolevskaya, Sobolevskoye), name of several rural localities in Russia

== See also ==
- Sobolewski
- Sobol (disambiguation)
- Soból, a village in Poland
- Sobolew (disambiguation)
- Sobolevo, several rural localities in Russia
- Sobel (disambiguation)
- Sobolev
