= Sobolev =

Sobolev (masculine) and Soboleva (feminine) is a popular Russian surname, derived from the word "соболь" (sable). Notable people with the surname include:

- Arkady Sobolev, Russian diplomat
- Alexander Sobolev, geologist
- Aleksandr Sobolev (born 1997), Russian footballer
- Aleksandr Sobolev (footballer, born 1995), Russian footballer
- Aleksei Sobolev (footballer) (1968–2001), Russian footballer
- Anastasiya Soboleva (b. 2004), Ukrainian tennis player
- Boris Sobolev, Canadian health services researcher
- Denis Sobolev (born 1993), Russian footballer
- Felix Sobolev (1931–1984), Ukrainian filmmaker
- Leonid Sobolev (1844–1913), Russian general
- Nikolay Sobolev (1936–2022), geologist
- Sergei Sobolev (politician) (b. 1961), Ukrainian politician
- Sergei Sobolev (1908–1989), Russian mathematician
- Stephan Sobolev, geophysicist
- Viktor Sobolev (disambiguation), several people
- Vitaliy Sobolev (1930–1995), Soviet footballer
- Vladimir Sobolev (disambiguation), several people
- Vladimir Sobolev (1908–1982), geologist
- Vyacheslav Sobolev (born 1984), Kazakhstan footballer
- Yelena Soboleva (born 1982), Russian runner

== See also ==
- Soboleff
