= Sobel =

Sobel (also with variations such as Szobol, Szobel, or Sobol) is a surname. Notable people with the surname include:

- Adam Sobel (born 1967), American climatologist
- Alex Sobel (born 1975), British politician
- Alex Sobel (basketball) (born 2000), American basketball player in the Israeli Basketball Premier League
- Barry Sobel (born 1959), American actor and comedian
- Bernard Sobel (1887–1964), American playwright, drama critic, and book writer
- Clifford Sobel (born 1949), United States diplomat and ambassador
- Curt Sobel (born 1953), American composer and music editor
- Daniel Sobel (born 1975), British educational consultant
- Dava Sobel (born 1947), writer of popular expositions of scientific topics
- David Sobel, American education writer
- Eleanor Sobel (born 1946), representative in the Florida House of Representatives
- Helen Sobel Smith (1910-1969), American bridge player generally known as Helen Sobel
- Henry Sobel (1944–2019), Brazilian rabbi
- Herbert Sobel (1912–1987), United States Army officer during World War II
- Hermann Szobel (born 1958), Austrian former pianist and composer
- Irwin Sobel (born 1940), American scientist, researcher in digital image processing
- Isador Sobel (1858–1939), American lawyer
- Janet Sobel (1894–1968), Ukrainian-American artist
- Joe Sobel (born 1945), American meteorologist
- Joel Sobel (born 1954), American economist
- John Sobel (born 1964), American tennis player
- Jordan Howard Sobel (1929-2010), Canadian-American philosopher
- Michael E. Sobel, American statistician
- Milton Sobel (1919–2002), professor of statistics at the University of California, Santa Barbara, awarded a Guggenheim Fellowship in 1967
- Robert Sobel (1931–1999), professor of history at Hofstra University and a writer of business histories
- Szymon Sobel (born 2001), Polish rapper
- Ted Sobel (born 1953), American sportscaster and author

In mathematics:

- Sobel operator, used to detect edges in images

== Fictional characters ==
- Rosa Sobel, the protagonist in The Diary of the Rose science fiction novelette by Ursula K. Le Guin

== See also ==
- Sobell (disambiguation)
- Sobol (disambiguation)
