= Sabaliauskas =

- Lithuanian surname
- m.: Sabaliauskas
- f.: (unmarried): Sabaliauskaitė
- f.: (married): Sabaliauskienė
- f.: (short): Sabaliauskė
- Related names: Sobolevsky, Sobolewski

Sabaliauskas is a Lithuanian surname. Notable people with the surname include:

- Ainius Sabaliauskas (born 2003), Lithuanian tennis player
- Kristina Sabaliauskaitė (born 1974), Lithuanian author
- Marius Sabaliauskas (born 1978), Lithuanian cyclist
- Rožė Sabaliauskienė (1901–1987), Lithuanian folklore song performer and collector
- Stasys Sabaliauskas (1905–1927), Lithuanian footballer
- Vladislovas Sabaliauskas (1910–1993), birth name of Walter James Sabalauski, American soldier
