= Sabol =

Sabol (Slovak feminine: Sabolová) is a surname. Notable people with the surname include:

- Blake Sabol (born 1998), American baseball player
- Ed Sabol (1916–2015), American filmmaker
- Joseph G. Sabol (1936–1998), American football player
- Juraj Sabol (born 1983), Slovak footballer
- Mária Sabolová (born 1956), Slovak politician
- Sebastian Sabol (1909–2003), Ukrainian priest
- Shaun Sabol (born 1966), American ice hockey player
- Steve Sabol (1942–2012), American filmmaker
- Veronika Sabolová (born 1980), Slovak luger

== See also ==
- Sobal
- Sobol (surname)
