= Ogden Elementary School =

Ogden Elementary School may refer to:

- The elementary division of Ogden International School in Chicago, Illinois
- Ogden Elementary School - Hewlett-Woodmere School District - Valley Stream, New York
- Ogden Elementary School - New Hanover County Schools - Wilmington, North Carolina
