= Soshnevo =

Soshnevo Сошнево
- Village
- Location within Vologda Oblast Location within Russia
- Coordinates: 58°47′N 36°30′E
- Country: Russia
- Region: Vologda Oblast
- District: Ustyuzhensky District
- Time zone: UTC+3:00

Soshnevo (Russian: Сошнево) is a rural locality (a village) in Soshnevskoye Rural Settlement, Ustyuzhensky District, Vologda Oblast, Russia. The population was 22 as of 2002.

== Geography ==
The distance to Ustyuzhna is 6 km (3.7 mi), to Sobolevo is 4 km (2.5 mi). Ramenye is the nearest rural locality.
