= Sobolewski =

Sobolewski (Polish pronunciation: [sɔbɔˈlɛfskʲi]) (feminine Sobolewska) is a Polish locational surname, which means a person from places in Poland called Sobolew or Sobolewo, both derived from the Polish sobol, meaning "sable".

Notable people with this surname include:

- Andrzej Sobolewski (born 1951), Polish physicist and academic
- Johann Friedrich Eduard Sobolewsk (1808–1872), American violinist
- Krzysztof Sobolewski (born 1978), Polish politician
- Ludwik Leszek Sobolewski (born 1965), Polish lawyer and the CEO of the Bucharest Stock Exchange
- Michael Anthony Sobolewski (born 1954), American bassist and backing vocalist for Van Halen and the rock supergroups Chickenfoot and the Circle
- Paweł Sobolewski (born 1979), Polish footballer who played as midfielder
- Radosław Sobolewski (born 1976), Polish former football player
- Seton Sobolewski, American basketball coach
- Sigmund Sobolewski (1923–2017), Polish Catholic Holocaust survivor and activist

== See also ==
- Sobolevsky (disambiguation)
- Sobolew (disambiguation)
- Sobolewo (disambiguation)
- Sabaliauskas
