= Gwen Marcus =

American lawyer

H. Gwen Marcus
- Occupation: Attorney

H. Gwen Marcus (born November 19, 1956) is the executive vice president and general counsel at Showtime Networks Inc. She joined the company in 1984 as assistant council. Before then, she practiced entertainment law as an associate at the law firm of Paul, Weiss, Rifkind, Wharton & Garrison.

== Biography ==
Marcus was born in Hempstead, New York to Helen and Richard Marcus.

A 1974 graduate of George W. Hewlett High School, Marcus was inducted into their hall of fame in 2013. She graduated magna cum laude and Phi Beta Kappa from Brandeis University and cum laude from the New York University School of Law. At NYU, she was an articles editor of the New York University Law Review and was elected to the Order of the Coif. She is a member of the New York Bar.

== Personal life ==
Previously married and divorced, on May 10, 2003, she entered into a domestic partnership with Nancy Alpert. Marcus and Alpert met when Marcus was a summer intern at Paul Weiss and Alpert was an associate.

== Honors ==
She has received several awards and honors.

- 50 Most Powerful Women in Cable by CableFAX: The Magazine
- The Hollywood Reporter’s Women in Entertainment Power 100 list
- She serves on the board and executive committee for the Theatre Development Fund and is a former board co-chair of the LGBT Community Center of New York, which awarded her with its Corporate Leader Award in 2006.
- The Hollywood Reporter's 2018 Raising the Bar honoree
