= Soboleff =

Soboleff is a surname, a transliteration variant of the Russian surname Sobolev. Notable people with the surname include:

- I. S. K. Soboleff (1892-1984), Russian adventurer, author, and military officer
- Vicki Lee Soboleff (born 1964), Haida and Tlingit artist, dancer, and teacher
- Vincent Soboleff (fl. 1890s-1920s), Russian-American photographer, subject of research by Sergei Kan
- Walter Soboleff (1908-2011), Tlingit scholar, elder and religious leader
