= Brian Raider =

American film and television producer

- Occupation: Producer
- Years active: 2006 – present

Brian Raider is an American film and television producer.

== Early life ==
Raider graduated from George W. Hewlett High School in Hewlett, New York, in 1998, and went on to the University of Maryland, College Park. He moved to New York City to work in the mortgages and investments department of Wells Fargo, and then in stocks and bonds at JPMorgan. After walking by the set of a film or TV production, he became friendly with a producer, and over the next two years began working on productions as he learned the film business. Raider served as a line producer on the comedy Uncle Marvin's Apartment. It was released on September 20, 2010.

== Career ==
Raider has worked on the eight-episode Fuse television series G-life, and on 13 episodes of the Velocity show Car Crazy in 2013. He served in various production capacities on films including the aforesaid two as well as Grey Skies (2010), and Americons, for which he was line producer. In addition, he has worked as a production manager on such television series as Judge Joe Brown, Judge Judy and Germany’s Next Top Model.

Raider was the executive in charge of the television series The Carbonaro Effect.

== Television and filmography ==
| Year | Title | Credit | Notes |
|---|---|---|---|
| 2008 | Judge Judy | Production manager | TV series |
| 2008 | Divorce Court | Production manager | TV series |
| 2008 | Judge Joe Brown | Unit production manager | TV series (2008-2009) |
| 2009 | Germany's Next Top Model | Unit production manager | TV series documentary |
| 2009 | Alvin and the Chipmunks: The Squeakquel | Unit production manager | Film |
| 2010 | Grey Skies | Line producer | Film |
| 2011 | Germany's Next Top Model Cycle 6 | Unit production manager | Reality-TV series |
| 2013 | G-Thing | Line producer/executive in charge | TV series |
| 2013 | Car Crazy | Producer | Reality-TV series |
| 2013 | Featured by Fameus | Executive producer | TV series |
| 2013 | Uncle Melvin's Apartment | Associate producer | Film |
| 2014 | Happy Fists Claudia | Co-producer | Film |
| 2014 | The Carbonaro Effect | Executive in charge | TV series (2014-2015) |
| 2015 | Americons | Line producer | Film |
| 2015 | Hidden Tears Project: Live from Riviera 31 at Sofitel Hotel | Producer | TV special |
| 2016 | Surprise! Instant Xmas Carol! | Line producer | TV special |
| 2017 | Hype Up | Line producer | TV series |
| 2018 | Twin Turbos | Line producer | TV series |
| 2018 | Rahat's Terror Traps | Line producer | TV mini-series |
| 2019 | I Am Jazz | Producer | TV series (2018-2019) |
| 2019 | Raising Wild | Line producer | TV series |
| 2019 | Fine Brothers Entertainment | Line producer | |
| 2020 | Sony Impossible Science | Line producer | |
| 2021-2023 | Warner Brothers Discover | Executive | |
