= Sobell =

Sobell is a surname. Notable people with the surname include:

- Helen Levitov Sobell (1918–2002), American teacher, scientist, and activist
- Linda C. Sobell, professor of clinical psychology
- Mark B. Sobell, professor and specialist in addiction
- Michael Sobell (1892–1993), British businessman
- Morton Sobell (1917–2018), American engineer, convicted of espionage in 1951
- Nina Sobell (born 1947), American artist

== See also ==
- Sobel (disambiguation)
