= George W. Hewlett High School =

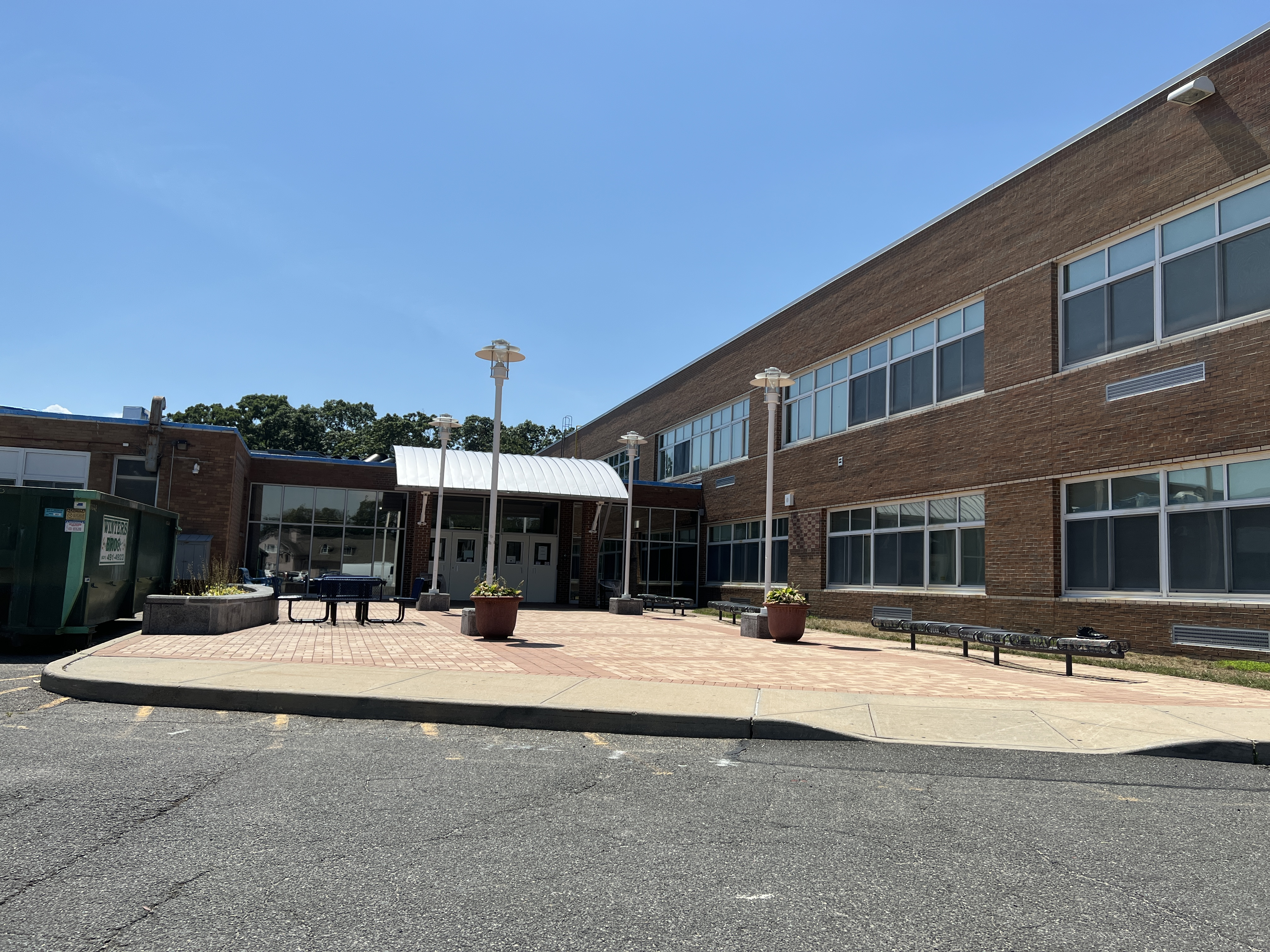
- George W. Hewlett High School in August 2022

Location
- 60 Everit Ave; Hewlett, New York 11557; United States; 40°38′22″N 73°41′51″W

Information
- Type: Public
- Motto: "Make it a good day or not, the choice is up to you!"
- Established: 1955
- School district: Hewlett-Woodmere Union Free School District
- NCES School ID: 363171004227
- Principal: Al Bauer
- Teaching staff: 95.77 (on an FTE basis)
- Grades: 9-12
- Enrollment: 1,013 (2023-2024)
- Student to teacher ratio: 10.58
- Campus: Suburban: Large
- Colors: Blue and White
- Mascot: Bulldogs
- Publication: The Spectrum
- Yearbook: Patches
- Website: hhs.hewlett-woodmere.net

George W. Hewlett High School (also known as Hewlett High School, or HHS, and replacing Woodmere High School) is a four-year public high school in Hewlett Bay Park, New York, United States. Located in the Five Towns area of Long Island, it is the only high school in the Hewlett-Woodmere Union Free School District (District 14).

== History ==
Hewlett High School opened in 1955. It was designed by Valley Stream-based Frederic P. Wiedersum Associates.

== Demographics ==
As of the 2018–19 school year, the school had an enrollment of 1,039 students and 96.6 classroom teachers (on an FTE basis), for a student–teacher ratio of 10.8:1. There were 212 students (20.4% of enrollment) eligible for free lunch and 37 (3.6% of students) eligible for reduced-cost lunch.

== Academics ==
George W. Hewlett High School is a National Academy of Music Arts and Sciences school and is one of three Nassau County Districts "that is certified as a Cisco CCNA Academy".

Hewlett High School frequently earns recognition for its top-tier science research department, directed by Dr. Terrence Bissoondial. Under the mentorship of Dr. Bissoondial, Hewlett students frequently compete and excel in competitions such as the Regneron International Science and Engineering Fair, Regeneron STS, and Junior Science and Humanities Symposium.

Other Hewlett-sponsored activities that achieve national recognition include DECA, Hewlett History and Quiz Bowl, and women's tennis. Hewlett is known for its strong music program, with students regularly being selected for All-State and All-Eastern ensembles.

In 2025, Hewlett High School student Eilon Bober-Tsafrir was appointed to be a page of the United States Senate, a first for the district.

Hewlett High School is widely regarded as a top public high school on Long Island and is known for its academic excellence. Hewlett offers 25 AP classes across the Humanities and STEM, including AB/BC Calculus, World History, Biology, Physics C, etc. Graduates regularly attend higher institutions of elite caliber, including Princeton, Binghamton, Duke, Harvard, and Cornell University.

== Demographics ==
As of the 2018–19 school year, the school had an enrollment of 1,039 students and 96.6 classroom teachers (on an FTE basis), for a student–teacher ratio of 10.8:1. There were 212 students (20.4% of enrollment) eligible for free lunch and 37 (3.6% of students) eligible for reduced-cost lunch.

As of the 2021–22 school year, 53% of HHS students are male and 47% female. 54% are Caucasian, 15% are Latino, 9% are Black/African American, 9% AAPI, and 3% multi racial. The community is known for having a large Russian Jewish population.

== Notable alumni ==
Many of Hewlett High School's more distinguished alumni have been recognized by plaques on the school's walls that name them as members of the school's Alumni Hall of Fame. The following are among the school's notable former students:

- Jennifer Aylmer (1990) - soprano
- Ross Bleckner (1967) – artist
- Brian Burns – Emmy-nominated writer and producer, Entourage, Blue Bloods, and Daddy's Home
- Edward Burns (1986) – actor, producer, writer, and director
- Howard Deutch – director of several hit movies, married to actress Lea Thompson
- Jimmy Diresta (1985) – television personality, Dirty Money
- Debbie Drimmer – VP of Talent, Comedy Central
- Meredith Eaton – actress known for Boston Legal and NCIS
- Gordon Edelstein (1972) – artistic director of the Long Wharf Theatre in New Haven, Connecticut
- Jane Friedman – President and CEO, HarperCollins; named on Vanity Fair's list of 200 Women Legends, Leaders and Trailblazers
- Jeffrey M. Friedman (1971) – scientist
- Lisa Glasberg (AKA Lisa G.) (1974) – NYC radio DJ
- Barbara Gaines (1975) – Late Night with David Letterman Emmy Award–winning producer
- Jordan Gelber (1993) – film, TV and Broadway actor
- Rande Gerber (1980) – nightclub owner, married to Cindy Crawford
- Brent Glass (1965) – director of the Smithsonian National Museum of American History
- Louise Glück (1961) – poet, Nobel Prize in Literature in 2020, Pulitzer Prize for Poetry in 1993, United States Poet Laureate 2003–04
- Bob Gottlieb – college basketball coach
- Larry "Melrose Larry Green" Greenblatt
- Carolyn Gusoff (1980) – news anchor/reporter WNBC Channel 4, NYC
- David M. Israel (1980) – TV producer and writer
- Donna Karan (1966) – fashion designer
- Peter Keisler (1977) – Supreme Court law clerk and former acting Attorney General of the United States
- Jeffrey Konvitz (1962) - novelist
- Tony Kornheiser (1965) – sportscaster/sportswriter, ESPN's Pardon the Interruption
- Matthew Laurance – actor (Mel Silver on Beverly Hills 90210), sideline analyst on the Duke Radio Network
- Gwen Marcus (1974) – Executive Vice President and General Counsel, Showtime
- Bruce Murray (1981) – radio sportscaster
- Brian Raider producer
- Modi Rosenfeld (1988) – comedian, actor
- Seth Rudetsky – Emmy Award–winning writer at The Rosie O'Donnell Show, musician, radio personality
- Lisa Schwarzbaum – movie critic
- Max Seibald (2005) – player for Long Island Lizards of Major League Lacrosse and Philadelphia Wings of National Lacrosse League
- Neal Simon (1986) – CEO of Bronfman Rothschild
- Dr. Joe Sobel (1963) – meteorologist, AccuWeather
- Jim Steinman (1965) – musical producer, known for collaboration with Meat Loaf and Bonnie Tyler
- Jonathan Tiomkin (1997) – Olympic athlete (fencing), member of gold-medal 2003 Pan Am Games team; silver medalist individually; 2003 and 1999 U.S. national champion
- Van Toffler (1976) – president of Viacom's Music & Logo Group, including MTV and VH1
- Stuart Weitzman (1958) – shoe designer
- Alan Zweibel (1968) – screenwriter and comedy writer, Saturday Night Live
