= Debra Drimmer =

American television producer

Debra Drimmer, more commonly known as Debbie Drimmer, (born August 16, 1963, New York City, New York) was formerly Vice President of Talent at Comedy Central for 8 years from March 1996 until March 2004. Prior to that position, Drimmer was a talent booker for Late Night then Late Show with David Letterman from March 1992 through March 1996.

== Early life and education ==
Drimmer is a 1981 graduate of George W. Hewlett High School and graduated from SUNY Oneonta with a B.A. degree in 1985.

== Career ==
Drimmer was Senior Talent Coordinator at Late Night and then the Late Show with David Letterman from February 1992 through March 1996.

She has a notable appearance on Last Comic Standing in the Season 2 episode where the comics had to perform in a laundromat.

Drimmer was a Production and Talent Coordinator for Night Flight.

== Filmography ==
As producer:

- Comedy Central's Bar Mitzvah Bash! (2004) as Executive In Charge Of Talent (Comedy Central)
- Out On The Edge (2004) as Executive In Charge Of Talent
- Denis Leary: Behind the Anger (2003) as Talent Executive (Comedy Central)
- Comedy Central Roast of Denis Leary, The (2003) as Talent Executive (Comedy Central)
- Wanda Sykes: Tongue Untied (2003) as Executive In Charge Of Talent
- Jay Mohr: My Turn (2003) as Executive In Charge Of Talent
- Commies, The (2003) as Executive In Charge Of Talent (Comedy Central)
- Comedy Central Presents The NY Friars Club Roast of Chevy Chase (2002) as Executive In Charge Of Talent
- Tracy Morgan: One Mic (2002) as Executive In Charge Of Talent
- Uncomfortably Close With Michael McKean: George Carlin (2001) as Executive In Charge Of Talent
- Uncomfortably Close With Michael McKean: Harold Ramis (2001) as Executive In Charge Of Talent
- Comedy Central Presents the New York Friars Club Roast of Hugh M. Hefner (2001) as Executive In Charge Of Talent
- Kevin James: Sweat the Small Stuff (2001) as Executive In Charge Of Talent
- Comedy Central Presents Hef's Pre-Roast Party (2001) as Executive In Charge Of Talent
- Uncomfortably Close With Michael McKean: Jonathan Winters (2000) as Executive In Charge Of Talent
- Comedy Central Presents the New York Friars Club Roast of Rob Reiner, The (2000) as Executive In Charge Of Talent
- Canned Ham: Eric Idle (2000) as Executive In Charge Of Talent
- All-Access Pass: A Behind-The-Scenes Look at the 14th Annual American Comedy Awards (2000) as Executive In Charge Of Talent
- Uncomfortably Close With Michael McKean: Rob Reiner (2000) as Executive In Charge Of Talent
- Uncomfortably Close With Michael McKean: Jerry Stiller (1999) as Executive In Charge Of Talent
- Comedy Rx: Comics Come Home 5 (1999) as Executive In Charge Of Talent
- Canned Ham: The Spy Who Shagged Me (1999) as Executive In Charge Of Talent
- Comedy Central Presents the New York Friars Club Roast of Jerry Stiller, The (1999) as Executive In Charge Of Talent
- Uncomfortably Close With Michael McKean: Jason Alexander (1999) as Executive In Charge Of Production
- Comics Come Home 4 (1998) as Executive In Charge Of Talent
