= Vladimir Sobolev =

Vladimir Sobolev may refer to:

- Vladimir Sobolev (diplomat) (1924–2010), Soviet diplomat and Ambassador to Belgium and Finland
- Vladimir Sobolev (geologist) (1908–1982), Soviet geologist
- Vladimir Sobolev (footballer) (born 1991), Russian footballer
