= Duncan v. Louisiana =

- Supreme Court of the United States

Argued January 17, 1968 Decided December 21, 1968
- Full case name: Gary Duncan v. State of Louisiana
- Citations: 391 U.S. 145 (more) 88 S. Ct. 1444; 20 L. Ed. 2d 491; 1968 U.S. LEXIS 1631; 45 Ohio Op. 2d 198

Case history
- Prior: Defendant convicted, Twenty-fifth Judicial District Court of Louisiana; cert. denied, 195 So. 2d 142 (La. 1967).
- Subsequent: Rehearing denied, 392 U.S. 947 (1968).

Holding
- The Fourteenth Amendment guarantees a right to a jury trial in all criminal cases which - were they to be tried in a federal court - would come within the Sixth Amendment's guarantee. Louisiana Supreme Court reversed and remanded.

Court membership
- Chief Justice Earl Warren Associate Justices Hugo Black · William O. Douglas; John M. Harlan II · William J. Brennan Jr. Potter Stewart · Byron White; Abe Fortas · Thurgood Marshall

Case opinions
- Majority: White, joined by Warren, Black, Douglas, Brennan, Fortas, Marshall
- Concurrence: Black, joined by Douglas
- Concurrence: Fortas
- Dissent: Harlan, joined by Stewart

Laws applied
- U.S. Const. amends. VI, XIV

Duncan v. Louisiana, 391 U.S. 145 (1968), was a significant United States Supreme Court decision which incorporated the Sixth Amendment right to a criminal jury trial and applied it to the states.

== Background ==
In October 1966, Gary Duncan, a 19-year-old African-American, was driving down a Louisiana highway when he noticed his nephew Bert Grant and cousin Bernard St. Ann with a group of four white teenagers, including Herman Landry, on the side of the road.

He became concerned because his cousins had reported occurrences of "racial incidents" at the recently desegregated school. He pulled over the car, stepped out, and asked his cousins to get in the car. Landry insulted Duncan, calling him a racial slur. According to historian Matthew Van Meter, Duncan told Landry to go home, "reaching out to the boy's arm in a gesture that was both conciliatory and final."

The white youths testified that Duncan slapped Landry at this point, but Duncan and his relatives denied it. Duncan was arrested and ultimately charged with simple battery. As it was punishable by no more than two years, simple battery is a misdemeanor under Louisiana law and so he was not subject to trial by jury. Duncan was convicted and received a 60-day prison sentence and a fine of $150.

He appealed on the grounds that the state had violated the Sixth and Fourteenth Amendments guaranteeing his right to a jury trial. The Court accepted the case, under its appellate jurisdiction from the Louisiana State Supreme Court.

== Issue ==
Do the Sixth and Fourteenth Amendments guarantee the right to jury trial in state prosecutions where sentences as long as two years may be imposed?

== Majority opinion ==
Justice White noted that the right to a jury trial for criminal offenses is a deeply enshrined value in the British and American legal traditions. Thus, right to a jury trial in criminal cases is within the 14th Amendment and so is applicable to the states.

The question for the court was whether an offense subject to two years' imprisonment is a "serious offense." The majority noted that at the time of ratification, crimes punishable by more than six months imprisonment were typically subject to jury trial. Furthermore, both federal law and 49 states recognized that a crime carrying a sentence of over one year necessitated a jury trial. The Court found that the Louisiana law was out of sync with both the historical and current standards of the justice system and so was ruled unconstitutional.

== Concurring opinions ==
Justice Black, concurring, argues for total incorporation, holding that all amendments in the Bill of Rights are made applicable to the states by the Fourteenth Amendment. He cites Congressional records from the ratification of the amendment to support his position. He holds that anything less than total incorporation would leave the enforcement of these rights to the whims of the judiciary.

Justice Fortas, concurring, believed that the right to jury trial is fundamental for serious offenses, but it is not the court's role to dictate to the states what specific form such a jury trial should take. The states should be free to develop their own rules regarding the exercise of a jury trial and not to be held accountable to some historical or federal standard.

== Dissenting opinion ==
Justice Harlan, dissenting, wrote that states could devise their own systems, subject to the Constitution:

The States have always borne primary responsibility for operating the machinery of criminal justice within their borders, and adapting it to their particular circumstances. In exercising this responsibility, each State is compelled to conform its procedures to the requirements of the Federal Constitution. The Due Process Clause of the Fourteenth Amendment requires that those procedures be fundamentally fair in all respects. It does not, in my view, impose or encourage nationwide uniformity for its own sake; it does not command adherence to forms that happen to be old; and it does not impose on the States the rules that may be in force in the federal courts except where such rules are also found to be essential to basic fairness.

== Decision ==
The Supreme Court ruled 7–2 in favor of Duncan by arguing that the right to a jury trial in criminal cases was fundamental and central to the American conception of justice. As such the Due Process Clause of the Fourteenth Amendment requires states to honor requests for jury trials. The Court maintained the common-law exception for "petty crimes," which are defined as those punishable by a maximum of a $500 fine and six months in prison. In such cases, states are not obligated to provide jury trials.

== See also ==
- List of United States Supreme Court cases, volume 391
- The Duncan cases
