= Stephan Sobolev =

Russian-German geologist

Stephan Vladimirovich Sobolev
- Степан Владимирович Соболев
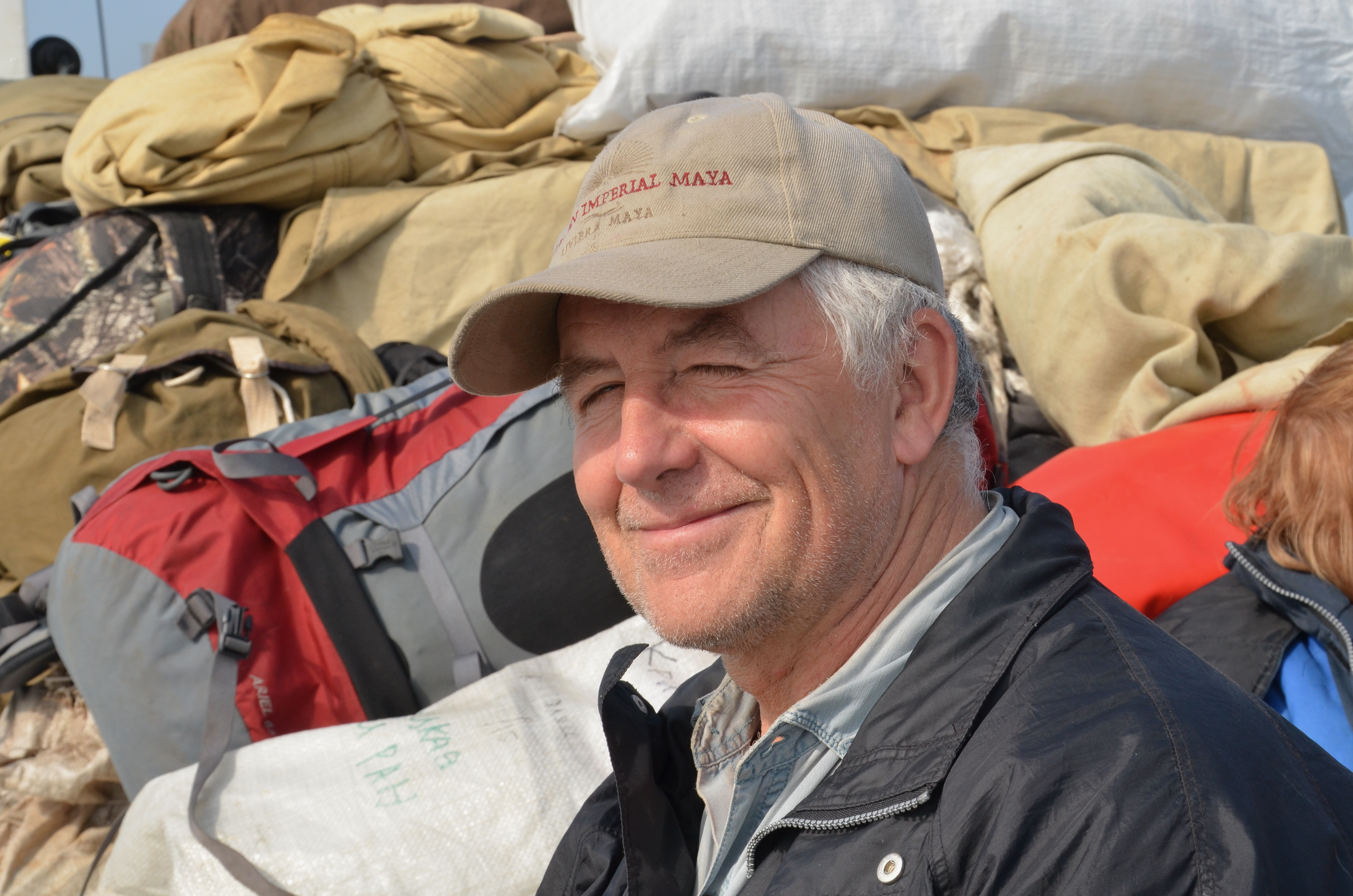
- Stephan Sobolev in fieldwork at Siberian Traps, Polar Siberia, Russia, 2012.
- Born: March 23, 1954; Lviv, Ukrainian SSR, Soviet Union
- Education: Novosibirsk State University (Diploma, 1976)
- Known for: Geodynamic and petrophysical modelling of plate-boundary deformation; modelling of mantle convection and tectonic style; tsunami early-warning concepts based on real-time GNSS/GPS
- Awards: Member, Academia Europaea (elected 2021); ERC Synergy Grant (MEET, PI; 2020–2026)
- Scientific career
- Fields: Geophysics, Geodynamics, Computational geodynamics, Seismology
- Workplaces: GFZ Helmholtz Centre Potsdam – GFZ German Research Centre for Geosciences; University of Potsdam
- Thesis: (1980)

Stephan Vladimirovich Sobolev (Russian: Степан Владимирович Соболев; born 23 March 1954) is a Russian–German geophysicist and computational geodynamicist working on physical modeling of mantle convection and its effects on geodynamics. He is a group leader at the GFZ Helmholtz Centre Potsdam and Professor of Geodynamics at the University of Potsdam. He is a principal investigator of the European Research Council (ERC) Synergy project Monitoring Earth Evolution Through Time (MEET) and member of the Academia Europaea.

== Early life and education ==
Sobolev was born on 23 March 1954 in Lviv (then Ukrainian SSR, Soviet Union) in the family of Vladimir S. Sobolev. His brothers include Nikolay Sobolev and Alexander Sobolev. He graduated with distinction from Novosibirsk State University (Faculty of Geology and Geophysics) in 1976. In 1980 he defended a Candidate of Sciences (PhD-equivalent) dissertation at the Schmidt Institute of Physics of the Earth (USSR Academy of Sciences).

== Career ==
According to the Academia Europaea profile, Sobolev worked at the Schmidt Institute of Physics of the Earth in Moscow from 1976 to 1993, progressing to head a modelling section. He then held positions in Germany including an Alexander von Humboldt Research Fellowship at the Geophysical Institute of the University of Karlsruhe (1992–1996), a visiting professorship at the Institut de Physique du Globe (University of Strasbourg) (1996–1997), and subsequently appointments at GFZ Potsdam (from 1997).

At GFZ, he founded and headed the Section of Geodynamic Modelling (2007–2019). In 2015 he accepted a W3 professorship in Geodynamics at the University of Potsdam as a joint appointment with GFZ. In 2020 he became a principal investigator of the ERC Synergy project MEET (2020–2026).

== Research ==
Sobolev’s research spans numerical and physical modelling of plate-boundary deformation and associated hazards, mantle convection and tectonic style (including early Earth), interaction between thermochemical mantle plumes and lithosphere producing large igneous provinces and coupled geodynamic–petrological approaches linking deformation, phase changes and magmatism. According to Google Scholar of January 3, 2026 Stephan Sobolev's papers have been cited over 14000 times in scientific literature.

== Honours and awards ==
- Member, Academia Europaea (Earth & Cosmic Sciences), elected 2021.
- ERC Synergy Grant: Monitoring Earth Evolution Through Time (MEET), principal investigator (research period 2020–2026).
- GFZ Senior Researcher Award for outstanding research (2004).
- Alexander von Humboldt Research Fellowship (1992).
- Academy of Sciences (USSR) Medal for Best Research in Geosciences (1987).

== Selected publications ==
- Muldashev, I. A.; Sobolev, S.V. (2020). “What Controls Maximum Magnitudes of Giant Subduction Earthquakes?”. Geochemistry, Geophysics, Geosystems. doi:10.1029/2020GC009145.
- Sobolev, S. V.; Brown, M. (2019). “Surface erosion events controlled the evolution of plate tectonics on Earth”. Nature. doi:10.1038/s41586-019-1258-4.
- Sobolev, S. V. et al. (2011). “Linking mantle plumes, large igneous provinces and environmental catastrophes”. Nature. doi:10.1038/nature10385.
- Sobolev, S. V. et al. (2007). “Tsunami early warning using GPS‐Shield arrays”. Journal of Geophysical Research: Solid Earth. doi:10.1029/2006JB004640.
- Sobolev, S. V.; Babeyko, A. Y. (2005). “What drives orogeny in the Andes?”. Geology. doi:10.1130/G21557.1 .
- Babeyko, A. Y.; Sobolev, S. V. (2005). “Quantifying different modes of the late Cenozoic shortening in the central Andes”. Geology. doi:10.1130/G21126AR.1.
- Sobolev, S. V. (1996). “Upper mantle temperatures from teleseismic tomography of the Baltic shield”. Earth and Planetary Science Letters. doi:10.1016/0012-821X(95)00238-8.

== See also ==
- Vladimir Sobolev (geologist)
- Alexander Sobolev (geologist)
- Nikolay Sobolev
