= Richard B. Sobol =

American civil rights lawyer (1937–2020)

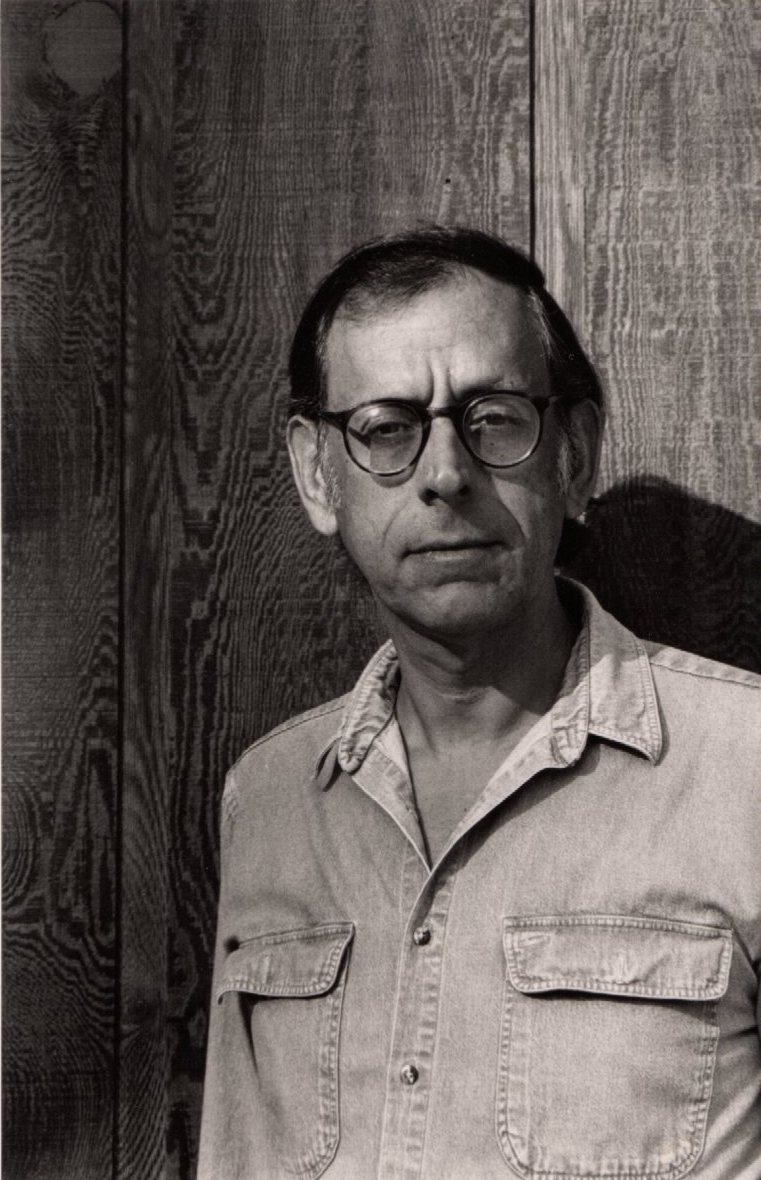
- Richard Sobol in 1991
- Born: May 29, 1937; New York City, New York
- Died: March 24, 2020 (aged 82); Sebastopol, California
- Occupation: lawyer
- Known for: civil rights litigation, particularly class actions asserting the rights of minorities and women
- Notable work: Duncan v. Louisiana, 391 U.S. 145 (1968); Bending the Law: the Story of the Dalkon Shield Bankruptcy (Univ. of Chicago)

Richard Barry Sobol (May 29, 1937 – March 24, 2020) was an American lawyer who specialized in civil rights law. He worked primarily on desegregation cases in Louisiana.

== Early life ==
Sobol grew up in New York City on the West Side of Manhattan. He graduated from the Bronx High School of Science in 1954, Union College in Schenectady, New York, in 1958, and Columbia Law School in New York City in 1961. His father, a lawyer with a commercial practice, died during Sobol's first year in college. At Columbia Law School, Sobol ranked third in his graduating class and was Notes and Comments Editor of the Law Review.

Following law school, Sobol clerked for Paul Hays, a judge on the United States Court of Appeals for the Second Circuit, and for Philip Elman, at that time a Commissioner on the Federal Trade Commission. He then went to work as an associate at the Washington, D.C. firm of Arnold, Fortas & Porter, where he participated in antitrust and trade regulation cases on behalf of large corporate clients.

== Career ==
=== Lawyers Constitutional Defense Committee ===
In 1965, on his summer vacation from Arnold, Fortas & Porter, Sobol went to Louisiana as a volunteer for the Lawyers Constitutional Defense Committee (LCDC). The LCDC was formed in 1964 to provide lawyers for civil rights activists in Southern states who were arrested in connection with demonstrations, marches, voter registration efforts, sit-ins and other protest activities. (Note: The organization was sponsored by the National Council of Churches, the American Jewish Congress, the Congress of Racial Equality (CORE), the NAACP, the NAACP Legal Defense Fund, the Student Non-Violent Coordinating Committee, and most prominently the American Civil Liberties Union. LCDC was organized by Henry Schwarzschild, a long-time civil rights activist who had participated in the Freedom Rides and the March from Selma to Montgomery, and by Carl Rachlin, the General Counsel of CORE.) In the summer of 1966, Sobol took a leave of absence from the D.C. firm, moved with his wife and two young children to New Orleans, and went to work full-time for LCDC. He spent the next three years litigating civil rights cases for LCDC in federal and state courts all over Louisiana.

=== The Duncan cases ===
Sobol represented Gary Duncan from 1966 to 1972 in a series of cases around the desegregation of the Plaquemines Parish schools.

==== Duncan v. Louisiana ====
In Duncan v. Louisiana, Sobol took a criminal case arising in state court in Plaquemines Parish, Louisiana, to the Supreme Court of the United States. In October 1966, Gary Duncan, a 19-year-old black man who worked as a shrimp fisherman, stopped by the roadside when he saw two young relatives, students at the recently desegregated high school, surrounded by four white boys with several white men looking on from across the street. Duncan told his relatives to get in his truck, and then told the white boys to "go on home," touching one of them on the arm. Shortly thereafter, Duncan was arrested and charged with battery. At Duncan's trial in February 1967, the Parish judge denied Sobol's request for a jury. After a trial at which the black and white witnesses gave diametrically different testimony about what happened, the judge convicted Duncan and sentenced him to two months in jail and a $150 fine. The Louisiana Supreme Court denied review, and Sobol sought and obtained review in the Supreme Court of the United States. He argued the case in January 1968, and in May the Supreme Court rendered a decision establishing for the first time a right under the U.S. Constitution to a jury trial in state courts.

==== Sobol v. Perez ====
Meanwhile, in February 1967, shortly after Duncan's conviction (as Sobol took steps to seek review in the U.S. Supreme Court), local parish authorities arrested Sobol and charged him with the crime of practicing law without a license. The arrest took place at the direction of Leander Perez, an arch-segregationist who dominated Plaquemines Parish politics. LCDC, the civil rights law organization for which Sobol worked, brought a federal action against Perez seeking to enjoin Sobol's prosecution, focusing on the need for out-of-state lawyers such as Sobol to come to Louisiana to handle civil rights cases. The United States intervened as a plaintiff seeking the same relief. Sobol argued Duncan's case in the U.S. Supreme Court in January 1968, and in February Sobol's case against Perez was tried before a three-judge federal court in New Orleans. The Supreme Court ruled for Duncan on the jury issue in May 1968, and in July, the federal court in New Orleans found that the prosecution of Sobol was brought in bad faith and for purposes of harassment, enjoined the prosecution, and issued an opinion finding that Sobol was at all times acting in compliance with provisions of Louisiana law governing practice by out-of-state counsel.

==== Duncan v. Perez ====
Following the U.S. Supreme Court decision in Duncan's favor, local Parish authorities threatened again to prosecute him. The Supreme Court's decision in favor of Duncan provided that a charge of battery under Louisiana law was punishable by up to two years in jail and that "a crime punishable by two years in prison is...a serious crime...and entitled to a jury trial." After the Supreme Court decision, the Louisiana legislature reduced the maximum sentence for simple battery from two years to six months. In January 1969, Sobol and LCDC lawyers brought federal suit against Perez to enjoin further prosecution of Duncan. In October 1970, the federal court in New Orleans found that the repeated arrests of Duncan in the course of the litigation and the high bonds that the Parish judge required showed that the prosecution was maintained in bad faith and for harassment in an effort to punish Duncan for his exercise of federally secured rights. "The reprosecution of Duncan would deter and suppress the exercise of federally secured rights by Negroes in Plaquemines Parish. The various stages of the Duncan and Sobol cases have been thoroughly publicized in the New Orleans papers, which the parties have stipulated are the only daily newspapers generally read by residents of Plaquemines Parish. Duncan has waged an unprecedented four-year fight to avoid conviction and incareration on the charges against him." Parish officials then appealed to the federal appellate court, and when they lost there, sought review in the U.S. Supreme Court. In 1972, almost six years after Duncan was arrested, the Supreme Court rejected the Parish's request for review, finally bringing to an end the cascade of litigation that began when Duncan touched a white boy on the arm.

=== Sobol's LCDC cases other than Duncan ===
==== School desegregation cases ====
In Moses v. Washington Parish School Board, the federal district court required establishment of biracial attendance zones in lieu of the freedom of choice plan previously relied upon as the means of disestablishing a segregated school system.

In Carter v. West Feliciana School Board, the Supreme Court of the United States summarily reversed an en banc decision of the United States Court of Appeals for the Fifth Circuit, which would have afforded Southern school districts an additional year in which to implement plans for the disestablishment of segregated school systems. Sobol originally filed this case shortly after arriving as an LCDC summer volunteer in 1965.

==== Employment discrimination cases ====
Hicks v. Crown Zellerbach Corp., one of the first cases tried under Title VII of the 1964 Civil Rights Act in July 1967 and which addressed important procedural and substantive questions under the Act, 49 F.R.D. 184 (E.D. La. 1967, 1968); 310 F. Supp. 536 (E.D. La. 1970); 319 F. Supp. 314 (E.D. La. 1970); 321 F. Supp. 1241 (E.D. La. 1971).

Oatis v. Crown Zellerbach Corp., 398 F.2d 496 (5th Cir. 1968).

United States and Local 189a v. Local 189, 282 F. Supp. 39 (E.D. La. 1968); 301 F. Supp. 906 (E.D. La. 1969), aff’d; 416 F.2d 980 (5th Cir. 1969), cert. denied; 397 U.S. 919 (1970), upholding remedial seniority rights for formerly segregated black employees.

==== Defense of civil rights workers ====
Whatley v. City of Vidalia, 399 F.2d 521 (5th Cir. 1968).

Wyche v. Louisiana, 394 F.2d 927 (5th Cir. 1967).

Wyche v. Hester, 431 F.2d 791 (5th Cir. 1970).

State v. Lewis, 250 La. 876, 199 So. 2d 907 (1967).

State v. Skiffer, 253 La. 405, 218 So. 2d 313 (1969).

Zanders v. Louisiana State Board of Education, 281 F. Supp. 747 (W.D. La. 1968).

Scott v. Davis, 404 F.2d 1373 (5th Cir. 1968).

==== Voting rights cases ====
Wyche v. Post, 297 F. Supp. 46 (W.D. La. 1969).

Brown v. Post, 279 F. Supp. 60 (W.D. La. 1968).

==== Challenge under Title VI of the CRA of 1964 ====
Challenge under Title VI of the Civil Rights Act of 1964 to Use of Federal Funds to Construct Housing in Segregated Neighborhoods in Bogalusa.

Hicks v. Weaver, 302 F. Supp. 619 (E.D. La. 1969).

==== Challenge to Exclusion of Agricultural Workers from the NLRA ====
Challenge to Constitutionality of Exclusion of Agricultural Workers from the National Labor Relations Act.

Local 300 v. McCulloch, 428 F.2d 396 (5th Cir. 1970).

=== Summary of Richard Sobol's LCDC cases ===
In the two-and-a-half years he was employed by LCDC, Sobol handled the cases listed below.

Case	Case type	Case cite	Ref.
Duncan v. Louisiana	Trial by jury is a fundamental right	391 U.S. 145 (U.S. 1968)	
Sobol v. Perez	Out-of-state attorney can practice law in Louisiana	289 F. Supp. 392 (E.D. La. 1968)	
Duncan v. Perez	Malicious prosecution	321 F. Supp. 181 (E.D. La. 1970)	
Duncan v. Perez	Malicious prosecution	445 F. 2d 557 (5th Cir. 1971)	
Moses v. Washington Parish School Board	School desegregation	276 F. Supp. 834 (E.D. La. 1967)	
Carter v. West Feliciana School Board	School desegregation	396 U.S. 290 (1969)	
Hicks v. Crown Zellerbach Corp.	Employment discrimination	49 F.R.D. 184 (E.D. La. 1967, 1968)	
Hicks v. Crown Zellerbach Corp.	Employment discrimination	310 F. Supp. 536 (E.D. La. 1970)	
Hicks v. Crown Zellerbach Corp.	Employment discrimination	319 F. Supp. 314 (E.D. La. 1970)	
Hicks v. Crown Zellerbach Corp.	Employment discrimination	321 F. Supp. 1241 (E.D. La. 1971)	
Oatis v. Crown Zellerbach Corp.	Employment discrimination	398 F. 2d 496 (5th Cir. 1968)	
United States and Local 189a v. Local 189	Employment discrimination	282 F. Supp. 39 (E.D. La. 1968)	
United States and Local 189a v. Local 189	Employment discrimination	301 F. Supp. 906 (E.D. La. 1969)	
United States and Local 189a v. Local 189	Employment discrimination	416 F. 2d 980 (5th Cir. 1969)	
United States and Local 189a v. Local 189	Employment discrimination	397 U.S. 919 (1970)	
Whatley v. City of Vidalia	Defense of civil rights workers	399 F. 2d 521 (5th Cir. 1968)	
Wyche v. Louisiana	Defense of civil rights workers	394 F. 2d 927 (5th Cir. 1967)	
Wyche v. Hester	Defense of civil rights workers	431 F. 2d 791 (5th Cir. 1970)	
State v. Lewis	Defense of civil rights workers	250 La. 876 (La. 1967); 199 So. 2d 907 (La. 1967)	
State v. Skiffer	Defense of civil rights workers	253 La. 405 (La. 1969); 218 So. 2d 313 (La. 1969)	
Zanders v. Louisiana State Board of Educ.	Defense of civil rights workers	281 F. Supp. 747 (W.D. La. 1968)	
Scott v. Davis	Defense of civil rights workers	404 F. 2d 1373 (5th Cir. 1968)	
Wyche v. Post	Voting rights	297 F. Supp. 46 (W.D. La. 1969)	
Brown v. Post	Voting rights	279 F. Supp. 60 (W.D. La. 1968)	
Hicks v. Weaver	Challenge to construction of public housing confined to black neighborhood under Title VI of the CRA of 1964	302 F. Supp. 619 (E.D. La. 1969)	
Local 300 v. McCulloch	Challenge to exclusion of agricultural workers from the NLRA	428 F. 2d 396 (5th Cir. 1970)	

== Published works ==
- Sobol, Richard B. (1991). Bending The Law: The Story of the Dalkon Shield Bankruptcy (hardcover) (1st ed.). Chicago, IL: The University of Chicago Press. ISBN 978-0-226-76752-9. Sobol's book won a 1992 American Bar Association Silver Gavel Award "in recognition of an outstanding contribution to public understanding of the American system of law and justice."
- Cooper, George; Sobol, Richard B. (1969). "Seniority and Testing Under Fair Employment Laws: A General Approach to Objective Criteria of Hiring and Promotion". Harvard Law Review. 82 (8): 1598–1679. doi:10.2307/1339638. JSTOR 1339638.
- Sobol, Richard B. (1962). "Gomillion v. Lightfoot: The Tuskegee Gerrymander Case by Bernard Taper (book review)". Columbia Law Review. 62: 748–751. doi:10.2307/1120089. JSTOR 1120089.
