= Joe Sobel =

American meteorologist (born 1945)

Dr. Joseph P. Sobel (born October 16, 1945), a meteorologist, is a native of New York City, New York, USA, and a graduate of George W. Hewlett High School on Long Island. He received his B.S. in meteorology from the University of Michigan in 1967 and an M.S. and Ph.D. in meteorology from the Pennsylvania State University in 1970 and 1976 respectively. Sobel was named a Centennial Fellow of the Penn State College of Earth and Mineral Sciences in 1996 and inducted into the Hewlett High School Hall of Fame in 2001.

Sobel is a member of the American Meteorological Society (AMS) and holds the AMS Seal of Approval for Television Meteorology. In 2004 he was recognized by the AMS for Outstanding Service as a Broadcast Meteorologist. Sobel has been an employee of AccuWeather, Inc. since 1972 and now serves as a Senior Vice President and heads the AccuWeather Forensic Department. He is co-inventor of the AccuWeather Exclusive RealFeel Temperature.

"Dr. Joe" has appeared on ABC, NBC Nightly News, The Today Show, and Bloomberg Television, MSNBC, and CNBC. He has provided more than one million weather forecasts and discussions to radio stations across the United States since 1972. A nationally recognized meteorologist, he was featured in the September 20, 2002 Newsweek article "Nerds of Weather".

Sobel has also been featured as an expert on cable television series including Court TV's Forensic Files in the episode "Dew Process" and The History Channel's Monster Quest in the episode "Birdzilla".
