= Nikolay Sobolev =

Soviet and Russian mineralogist and geologist (1935–2022)

Nikolay Vladimirovich Sobolev
- Николай Владимирович Соболев
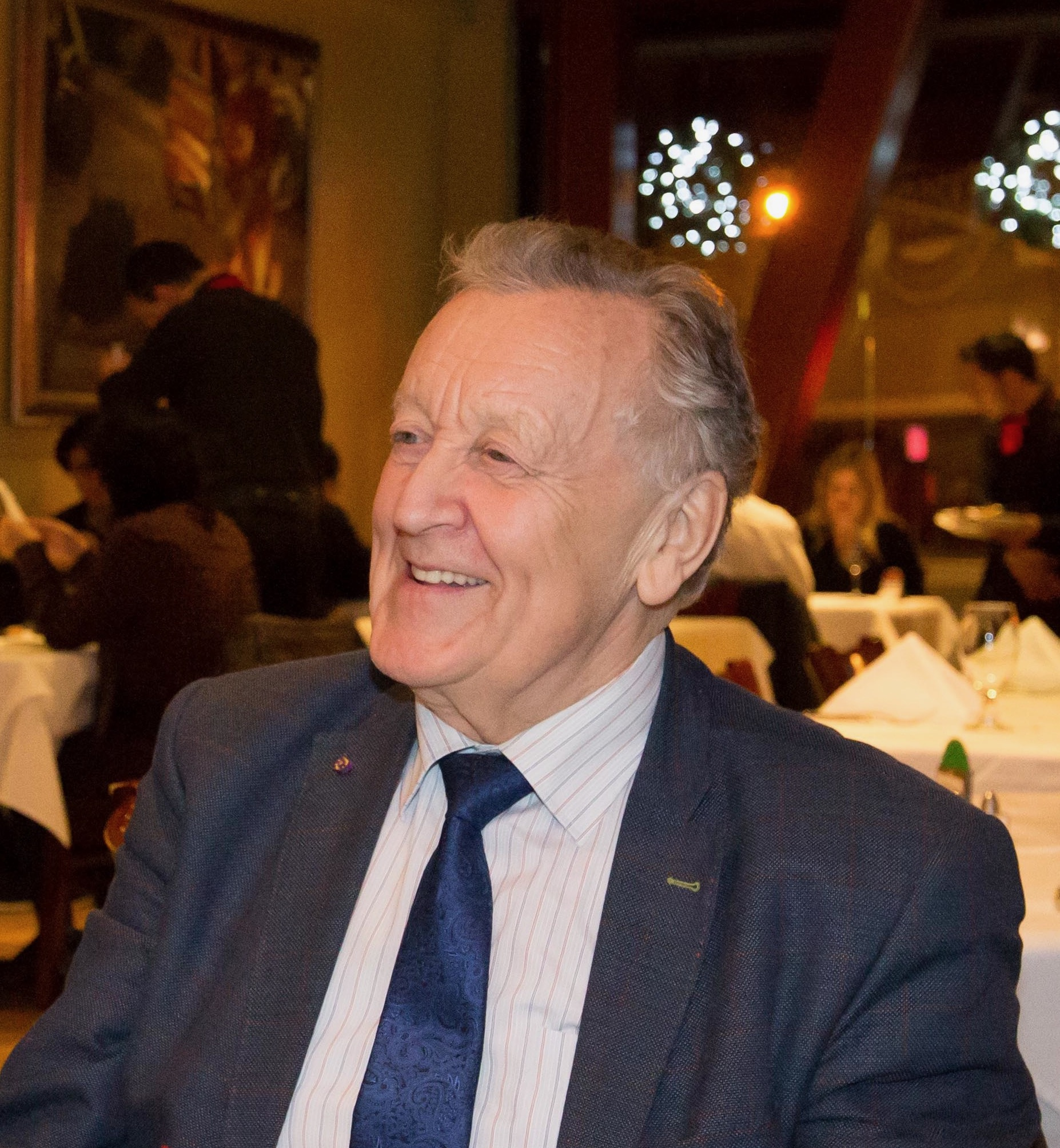
- Nick Sobolev 2016
- Born: May 28, 1935; Leningrad, Russian SFSR, Soviet Union
- Died: March 25, 2022; Novosibirsk, Russia
- Education: Lviv State University (graduated 1958)
- Known for: Mineral and fluid inclusions in diamonds; kimberlites and mantle xenoliths; evidence for ultrahigh-pressure metamorphism in crustal rocks (Kokchetav Massif)
- Awards: Lenin Prize (1976); IMA Medal of Excellence in Mineralogical Sciences (2013); Friedrich-Becke Medal (2019)
- Scientific career
- Fields: Mineralogy; Petrology; Geochemistry
- Workplaces: Siberian Branch of the Academy of Sciences (Novosibirsk); Institute of Geology and Geophysics (SB AS USSR); Institute of Mineralogy and Petrography (SB RAS); V. S. Sobolev Institute of Geology and Mineralogy (SB RAS)

Nikolay Vladimirovich Sobolev (Russian: Никола́й Влади́мирович Со́болев; 28 May 1935 – 25 March 2022) was a Soviet and Russian mineralogist, petrologist, and geochemist who studied processes in the lithospheric mantle and was a member of Russian (USSR), European, US National, and Italian Academies of Sciences.

== Early life and education ==
Sobolev was born in Leningrad (now Saint Petersburg) on 28 May 1935 in the family of Vladimir Sobolev. He graduated with honours from the Faculty of Geology of Lviv State University (now Ivan Franko National University of Lviv) in 1958 and worked briefly at the university, including as head of its mineralogical museum.

== Career ==
From 1960, Sobolev worked in Novosibirsk within the Siberian Branch of Russian Academy of Sciences research system, starting at the Institute of Geology and Geophysics and later holding senior leadership roles.

He was elected an Academician (full member) of the Soviet Academy of Sciences in 1990 (later the Russian Academy of Sciences).

He served as director of the Institute of Mineralogy and Petrography (Siberian Branch) from 1990 to 2006, and subsequently continued research at the V. S. Sobolev Institute of Geology and Mineralogy (SB RAS) as a senior scientist/adviser.

He defended a PhD thesis in 1963 and a Doctor of Science thesis in 1971, and later held a professorship (from 1985).

== Research ==
Sobolev's research focused on the mineralogy, petrology, and geochemistry of deep lithospheric environments, with particular emphasis on diamonds and their indicator minerals, kimberlites and related mantle-derived rocks, and high- to ultrahigh-pressure metamorphism.

His work contributed to (i) mineralogical criteria for diamond potential in kimberlites and exploration approaches, and (ii) documentation and interpretation of microdiamonds and coesite-bearing mineral inclusions in metamorphic rocks of the Kokchetav Massif, used as evidence for ultrahigh-pressure conditions during crustal subduction and exhumation.

== Editorial and professional service ==
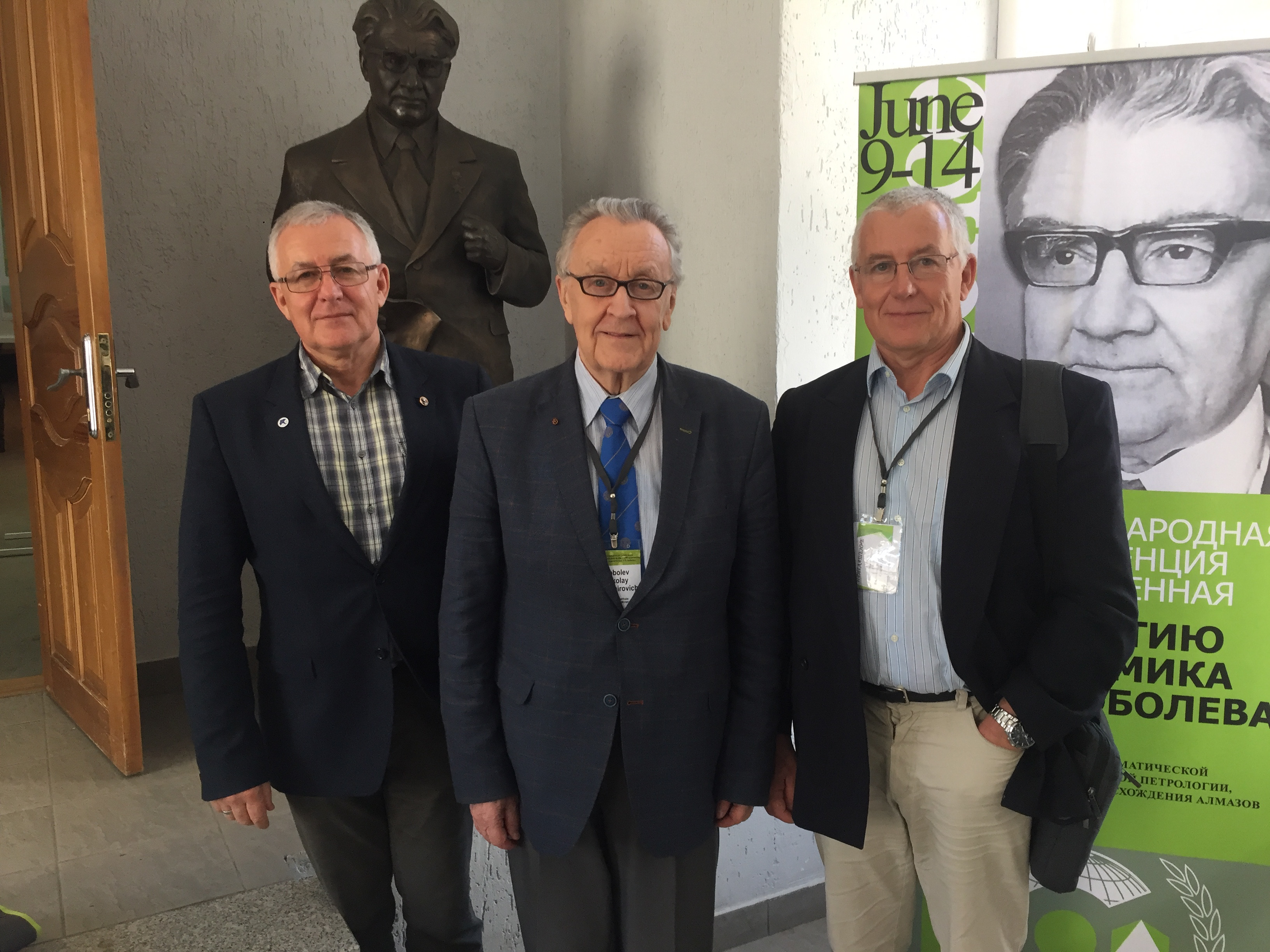
Nikolay (center), Alexander, and Stephan (right) Sobolev brothers against the backdrop of a sculpture and a photo of their father, Vladimir Sobolev, on his 110th anniversary (Novosibirsk, Russia, 2018).

Sobolev was editor-in-chief of the journal Geology and Geophysics for approximately 24 years (often reported as beginning in 1998).

He also served in international scientific bodies, including as vice-president of the International Mineralogical Association (1990–1994).

== Honours and recognition ==
Sobolev was elected a corresponding member of the Academy of Sciences in 1981 and a full member (academician) in 1990.

He received the Lenin Prize (1976) for a monograph series on metamorphic facies (as reported by institutional sources).

He was awarded the IMA Medal of Excellence in Mineralogical Sciences (2013).

In 2019 he received the Friedrich-Becke Medal of the Austrian Mineralogical Society (ÖMG).

He was also reported as a recipient of the A. E. Fersman Prize of the Russian Academy of Sciences and an Alexander von Humboldt international award.

Sobolev was a member of Academia Europaea and an international member of the U.S. National Academy of Sciences, member of Academy of Science in Rome (Accademia dei Lincei).

== Selected works ==
- Sobolev, N. V. (2003). "An origin of microdiamonds in metamorphic rocks of the Kokchetav Massif, Northern Kazakhstan". Episodes. 26 (4): 290–294. doi:10.18814/epiiugs/2003/v26i4/004.
- Hwang, S. L.; Shen, P.; Chu, H.-T.; Yui, T.-F.; Liou, J. G.; Sobolev, N. V.; Zhang, R. Y.; Shatsky, V. S.; Zayachkovsky, A. A. (2004). "Kokchetavite: a new potassium-feldspar polymorph from the Kokchetav ultrahigh-pressure terrane". Contributions to Mineralogy and Petrology. 148 (3): 380–389. Bibcode:2004CoMP..148..380H. doi:10.1007/s00410-004-0610-2.
- Dobretsov, N. L.; Shatsky, V. S.; Sobolev, N. V. (1995). "Comparison of the Kokchetav and Dabie Shan Metamorphic Complexes: Coesite- and Diamond-Bearing Rocks and UHP-HP Accretional-Collisional Events". International Geology Review. 37 (7): 636–656. Bibcode:1995IGRv...37..636D. doi:10.1080/00206819509465423.
- Claoué-Long, J. C.; Sobolev, N. V.; Shatsky, V. S.; Sobolev, A. V. (1991). "Zircon response to diamond-pressure metamorphism in the Kokchetav massif, USSR". Geology. 19 (7): 710–713. Bibcode:1991Geo....19..710C. doi:10.1130/0091-7613(1991)019<0710:ZRTDPM>2.3.CO;2.
- Sobolev, N. V.; Shatsky, V. S. (1990). "Diamond inclusions in garnets from metamorphic rocks: a new environment for diamond formation". Nature. 343 (6260): 742–746. Bibcode:1990Natur.343..742S. doi:10.1038/343742a0.
- Sobolev, N. V. (1977). Deep-seated inclusions in kimberlites and the problem of the composition of the upper mantle. American Geophysical Union. doi:10.1029/SP011. ISBN 0-87590-202-2.
