= Rožė Sabaliauskienė =

Lithuanian singer and folklorist (1901–1987)

Rožė Sabaliauskienė-Tamulevičiute (1901–1987), Lithuanian folk song performer and folklorist.

== Books ==
- 1972: Prie Merkio mano kaimas (My Village by Merkys). memoirs
- 1986: Atbēga elnias devyniaragis (The Nine-horned Deer Runs Away) Atbēga elnias devyniaragis (The Eight-horned Deer Runs Away)
  Book of folklore; includes songs, stories, and ethnographic descriptions of family and calendar customs of Dzūkija
