= Boris Sobolev =

Canadian health services researcher

- Born: June 9, 1960 (age 66); Yurga, USSR
- Education: Tomsk State University
- Scientific career
- Fields: Health Services Research

Boris Sobolev is a Russian-born Canadian health services researcher. He is an author of Analysis of Waiting-Time Data in Health Services Research and Health Care Evaluation Using Computer Simulation: Concepts, Methods and Applications, and is Editor-in-Chief of the Health Services Research series published by Springer Science+Business Media.

== Biography ==
Sobolev received a University Diploma in Applied Mathematics from Tomsk State University in 1983, a PhD in Applied Statistics from the USSR Academy of Sciences in 1989, and completed his post-doctoral training at the International Institute for Applied Systems Analysis in Austria in 1990. He came to Canada to work at Queen's University in Kingston, Ontario in 1996, and joined the University of British Columbia, Canada as a professor at the School of Population and Public Health in 2008. There he has taught a variety of courses, and introduced a new course on causal inferences into the curriculum. He also leads the Health Services and Outcomes Research Program at the Centre for Clinical Epidemiology and Evaluation.

== Research ==
Sobolev started his academic career at the Radiation Epidemiology Institute at the National Academy of Science of Ukraine, studying cancer risk in relation to exposure resulting from the Chernobyl accident. At Queen's University, he worked at the Centre for Health Services and Policy Research, examining how people get access to health care, what services they use, and what happens to patients as a result of this care. Sobolev is best known for pioneering the epidemiological approach to studying risk of adverse events in relation to time of receiving medical services. Currently, he leads the Canadian Collaborative Study on Hip Fractures.

== Teaching ==
In 2014, Sobolev introduced the course "Causal Inference in Public Health Sciences" to the graduate curriculum of the School of Population and Public Health, the University of British Columbia. The purpose of this course is to develop competency in applying causal inference methodology to observational data. It addresses a recognized need for a graduate-level course that links concepts and practical skills for making causal inference in epidemiology, health services research, occupational and environmental health.

== Honours and awards ==
Sobolev was awarded a Young Scientist Summer Program Fellowship at the International Institute for Applied Systems Analysis in Vienna in 1990, was the 2004 PWIAS Early Career Scholar award recipient, and became the Canada Research Chair in Statistics and Modeling of the Health Care System in 2003 - a distinction he held through to 2013.

== Health Services Research series ==
Sobolev serves as Editor-in-Chief for this 5-volume series published by Springer. The first two volumes of the series, Medical Practice Variations and Comparative Effectiveness Research, were published in 2016.
