= Daniel Sobel =

Educational consultant (born 1975)

Daniel Sobel FRSA (born 14 July 1975) is a consultant in the field of Inclusion (education). He is Chair of the International Forums of Inclusion Practitioners (IFIP), an international network focused on inclusive education. He was a teacher and mentor at Immanuel College, Bushey, and a SENCO and assistant head at King Solomon High School. In 2014, he established the company Inclusion Expert to continue this work. As Inclusion Expert’s founder, Sobel has advised the DfE, the EU and governments abroad.

Daniel is a public speaker, writes for publications including Headteacher Update and The Guardian, and is the author of several books including Narrowing the Attainment Gap and wellbeing focused Leading on Pastoral Care. The Inclusive Classroom (Bloomsbury Education, 2021).

== Early life and education ==
Sobel left school with no A Levels and read his first book aged 18. He secured a place on a Master’s course in Education Psychology and went on to take four graduate courses in Psychology and Education, eventually running out of money in the middle of doctoral training.

He began working part-time as a freelance consultant on inclusion for the Borough of Redbridge, promoting good practice through his articles.

Sobel moved to full time teaching and became a SENCO. During a stint as Assistant Head, he continued to develop simple systems to help teachers manage information and maximise the impact of their interventions.

Sobel then left teaching to form Inclusion Expert.

He is the Founding Director and Chair of the International Forums of Inclusion Practitioners (IFIP), an international network for inclusion practitioners.

In March 2024, UNESCO and IFIP co-organised the Global Inclusive Schools' Forum at UNESCO Headquarters in Paris, where Sobel appeared in the opening and closing sessions of the programme.

Sobel has also been associated with international conferences and forums focused on inclusive education, educational reform and artificial intelligence in education, including events in Bangladesh, Pakistan, Oman and Qatar.

== Articles ==
Sobel writes a regular column for The Guardian and has also written for the Times Educational Supplement, Optimus Education, SecEd and Headteacher Update. He focuses on the topics of the Pupil Premium, Special Educational Needs, and Inclusion in schools and the wider community.
