= Sobell (disambiguation) =

Sobell is a surname.

Sobell may also refer to:

- Sobell House Hospice, hospice serving the residents of Oxfordshire, England
- Michael Sobell Sinai School, in Kenton, Brent, England
- Sobell Industries, a past maker of radio and television sets
