= Viktor Sobolev =

Viktor Sobolev may refer to:

- Viktor Sobolev (scientist) (1915–1999), Soviet and Russian astrophysicist
- Viktor Sobolev (politician) (born 1950), Russian politician
- Viktor Sobolev (Kazakh politician), Deputy Prime Minister of Kazakhstan 1994–1996
