= Sobolevo, Cherepovetsky District, Vologda Oblast =

Sobolevo Соболево
- Village
- Location within Vologda Oblast Location within Russia
- Coordinates: 59°17′N 38°12′E
- Country: Russia
- Region: Vologda Oblast
- District: Cherepovetsky District
- Time zone: UTC+3:00

Sobolevo (Russian: Соболево) is a rural locality (a village) in Yaganovskoye Rural Settlement, Cherepovetsky District, Vologda Oblast, Russia. The population was 27 as of 2002.

== Geography ==
Sobolevo is located 33 km northeast of Cherepovets (the district's administrative centre) by road. Beketovo is the nearest rural locality.
