= Sobole =

Sobole may refer to the following places:

- Sobole, Lublin Voivodeship (east Poland)
- Sobole, Masovian Voivodeship (east-central Poland)
- Sobole, Warmian-Masurian Voivodeship (north Poland)

== See also ==
- Sobol (disambiguation)
