= Sobolevo, Kamchatka Krai =

Selo in Sobolovsky District, Kamchatka Krai, Russia

Sobolevo Соболево
- Selo
- Interactive map of Sobolevo
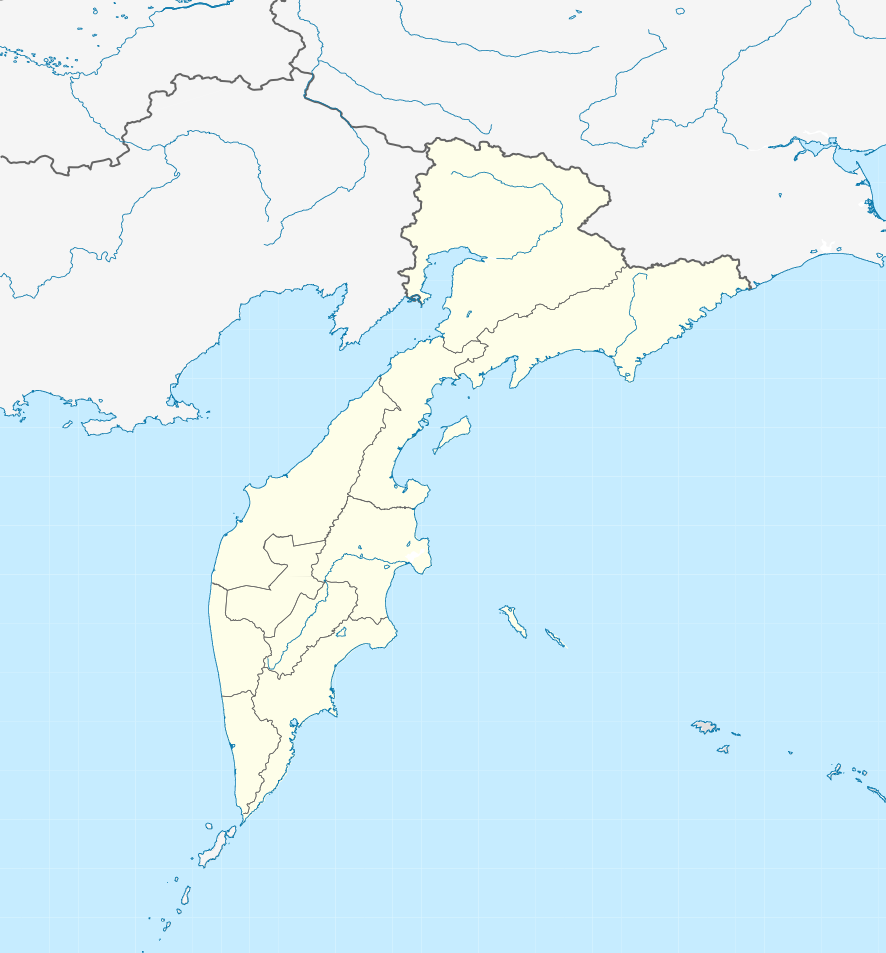
- Location of Sobolevo Sobolevo (Kamchatka Krai)
- Coordinates: 54°17′56″N 155°56′46″E
- Country: Russia
- Federal subject: Kamchatka Krai
- Administrative district: Sobolevsky District
- Founded: before 1700

Population (2010 Census)
  - Total: 1,733
  - Estimate (2023): 1,420 (−18.1%)

Municipal status
  - Capital of: Sobolevsky District
- Time zone: UTC+12 (MSK+9)
- Postal code: 684200
- Dialing code: +7 41536
- OKTMO ID: 30613401101

Sobolevo (Russian: Соболево) is a rural locality (a selo) and the administrative center of Sobolevsky District, Kamchatka Krai, Russia. Population: 1,773 (2010 census); 1,893 (2002 census); 2,922 (1989 Soviet census).

== Climate ==
Sobolevo has a rare, dry-summer variant of subarctic climate (Köppen climate classification Dsc) with very long, frigid winters – although about 9 °C (16 °F) less cold than interior Siberia at the same latitude – and short, very mild summers. Precipitation is much higher than most subarctic climates and peaks in the autumn when the Sea of Okhotsk is still unfrozen and string onshore winds from the Siberian High and Aleutian Low are usual.

Climate data for Sobolevo (Climate ID:32477)
Month	Jan	Feb	Mar	Apr	May	Jun	Jul	Aug	Sep	Oct	Nov	Dec	Year
Record high °C (°F)	7.1 (44.8)	9.9 (49.8)	12.0 (53.6)	14.7 (58.5)	23.5 (74.3)	27.5 (81.5)	32.7 (90.9)	27.4 (81.3)	27.3 (81.1)	18.9 (66.0)	13.2 (55.8)	10.1 (50.2)	32.7 (90.9)
Mean daily maximum °C (°F)	−6.6 (20.1)	−5.6 (21.9)	−1.8 (28.8)	1.9 (35.4)	8.0 (46.4)	13.5 (56.3)	17.1 (62.8)	16.7 (62.1)	13.7 (56.7)	7.5 (45.5)	0.0 (32.0)	−5.4 (22.3)	4.9 (40.9)
Daily mean °C (°F)	−12.0 (10.4)	−11.5 (11.3)	−7.3 (18.9)	−2.0 (28.4)	3.6 (38.5)	8.7 (47.7)	12.4 (54.3)	12.6 (54.7)	9.1 (48.4)	3.5 (38.3)	−3.9 (25.0)	−10.3 (13.5)	0.2 (32.4)
Mean daily minimum °C (°F)	−18.1 (−0.6)	−17.8 (0.0)	−13.3 (8.1)	−6.2 (20.8)	0.0 (32.0)	4.8 (40.6)	8.8 (47.8)	9.3 (48.7)	5.1 (41.2)	0.0 (32.0)	−8.1 (17.4)	−15.7 (3.7)	−4.3 (24.3)
Record low °C (°F)	−43.4 (−46.1)	−44.6 (−48.3)	−37.8 (−36.0)	−30.6 (−23.1)	−13.6 (7.5)	−3.7 (25.3)	−1.3 (29.7)	−2.2 (28.0)	−7.4 (18.7)	−19.2 (−2.6)	−34.2 (−29.6)	−39.9 (−39.8)	−44.6 (−48.3)
Average precipitation mm (inches)	36.6 (1.44)	29.7 (1.17)	33.8 (1.33)	32.5 (1.28)	38.7 (1.52)	47.6 (1.87)	63.5 (2.50)	104.6 (4.12)	111.7 (4.40)	135.8 (5.35)	109.4 (4.31)	54.7 (2.15)	798.6 (31.44)
Source: Roshydromet
