= Sobol =

Sobol may refer to:

- Sobol (surname)
- Soból, Lublin Voivodeship, Poland, a village
- Sobol, Oklahoma, United States
- Sobol sequence, a kind of quasi-random sequence

== See also ==
- Sobel (disambiguation)
- Sobole (disambiguation)
