= Sobolevsky (rural locality) =

Sobolevsky (Russian: Соболевский; masculine), Sobolevskaya (Соболевская; feminine), or Sobolevskoye (Соболевское; neuter) is the name of several rural localities in Russia:

- Sobolevsky, Krasnodar Krai, a khutor in Prikubansky Rural Okrug of Slavyansky District of Krasnodar Krai
- Sobolevsky, Mari El Republic, a settlement in Azyakovsky Rural Okrug of Medvedevsky District of the Mari El Republic
- Sobolevskoye, a selo in Verkhneuslonsky District of the Republic of Tatarstan
- Sobolevskaya, Arkhangelsk Oblast, a village in Bestuzhevsky Selsoviet of Ustyansky District of Arkhangelsk Oblast
