= Sobolewo =

Sobolewo may refer to the following places:

- Sobolewo, Białystok County in Podlaskie Voivodeship (north-east Poland)
- Sobolewo, Suwałki County in Podlaskie Voivodeship (north-east Poland)
- Sobolewo, Wysokie Mazowieckie County in Podlaskie Voivodeship (north-east Poland)
- Sobolewo, Greater Poland Voivodeship (west-central Poland)
- Sobolewo, West Pomeranian Voivodeship (north-west Poland)

== See also ==
- Sobolevo, list of places in Russia
