= Alexander Sobolev (geologist) =

Russian geologist

- Александр Соболев
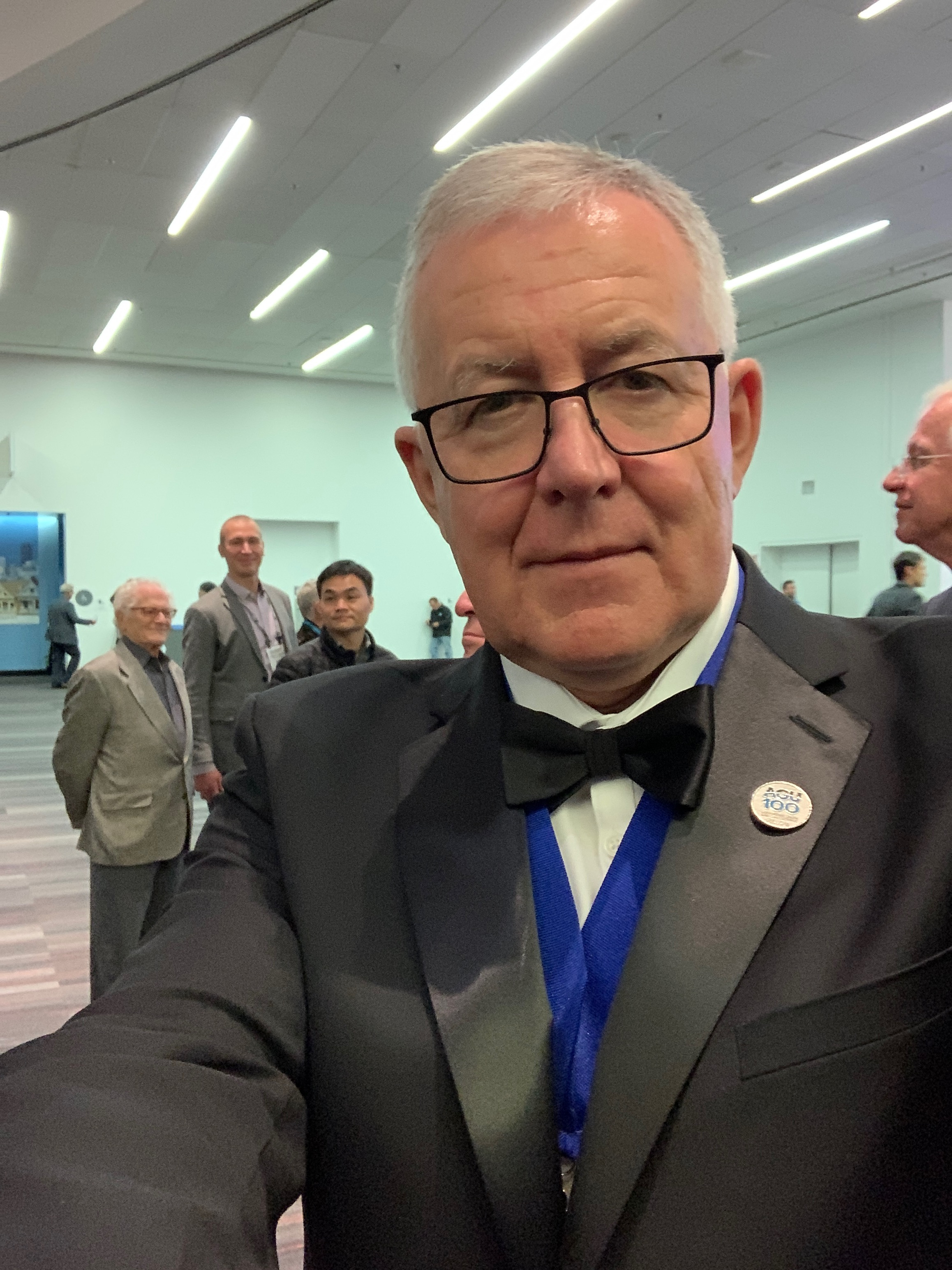
- Alexander V. Sobolev at the award ceremony for the Fellowship of the American Geophysical Union, San Francisco, USA, December 11, 2019.
- Born: 23 March 1954 (age 72); Lviv, Ukrainian SSR, Soviet Union
- Education: Novosibirsk State University
- Known for: Melt inclusion geochemistry; mantle-derived magmas; mantle source heterogeneity
- Awards: Humboldt Research Award (1999); Wolfgang Paul Research Award programme (2001)
- Scientific career
- Fields: Geochemistry; Petrology
- Workplaces: Vernadsky Institute of Geochemistry and Analytical Chemistry (GEOKHI, RAS); Université Grenoble Alpes (ISTerre)

Alexander Vladimirovich Sobolev (Russian: Алекса́ндр Влади́мирович Со́болев; born 23 March 1954) is a Russian-French geochemist, petrologist and mineralogist whose research focuses on the origin of mantle-derived magmas and their sources, using the composition of olivines, melt inclusions, physical chemistry and modelling.

Sobolev is a full member (academician) of the Russian Academy of Sciences (elected in 2016) and a member of Academia Europaea (elected in 2013) He was elected a Fellow of the American Geophysical Union in 2019 and a Geochemistry Fellow (2021) of the Geochemical Society and the European Association of Geochemistry. In 2015 he became a senior member (now membre honoraire) of the Institut universitaire de France.

Sobolev is listed by the European Commission's CORDIS database as a corresponding principal investigator of the European Research Council Synergy project Monitoring Earth Evolution Through Time (MEET, 2020–2027).

== Biography ==
Sobolev graduated with distinction from Novosibirsk State University and has worked at the Vernadsky Institute of Geochemistry and Analytical Chemistry (GEOKHI) of the Russian Academy of Sciences in Moscow. In 1983 he defended Candidate of Science (PhD-equivalent) and in 1997 Doctor of Science (DSc -UK equivalent) dissertation at the GEOKHI. Since 2009 he has been affiliated with Université Grenoble Alpes (ISTerre, Grenoble).

== Family ==
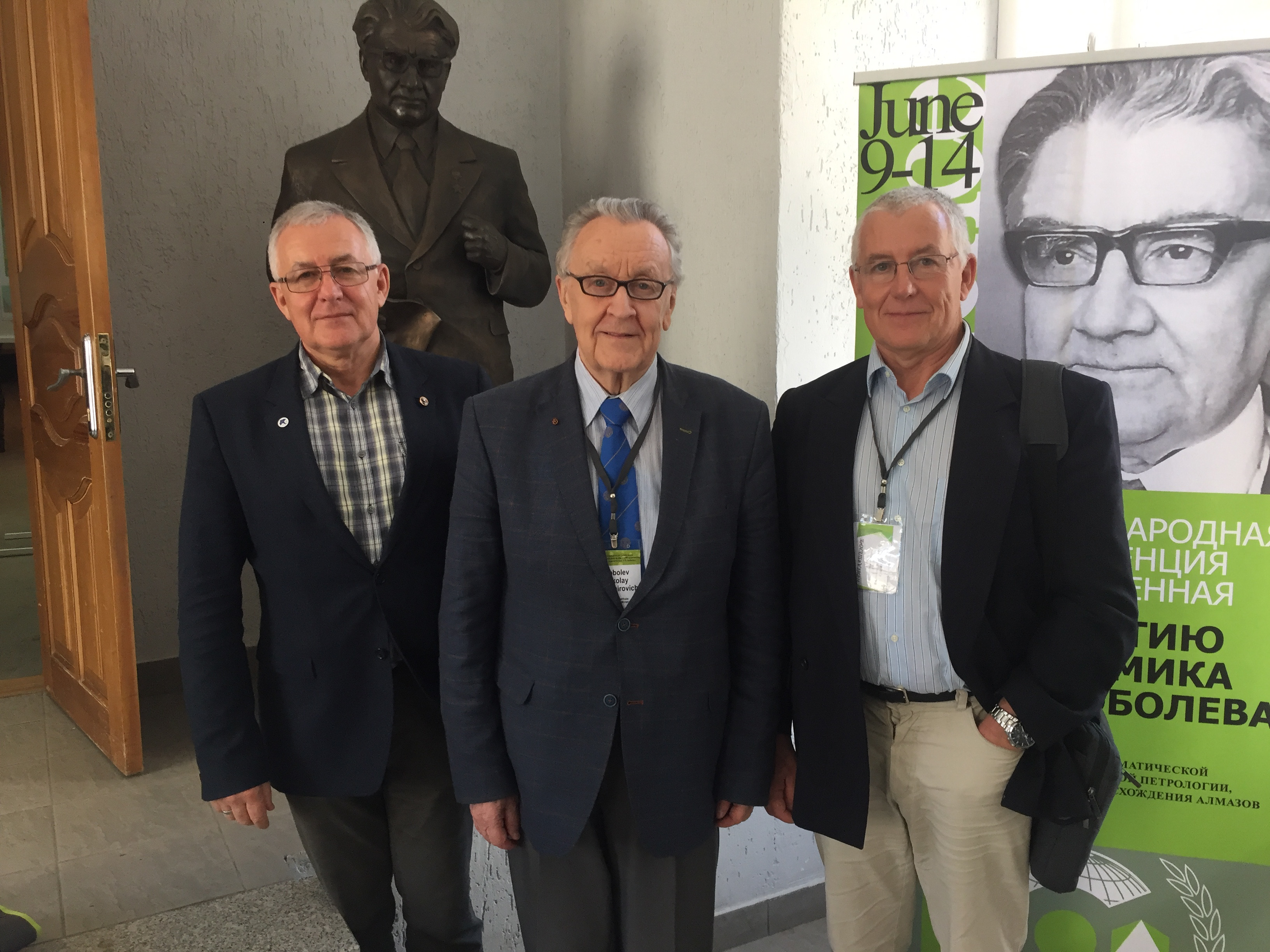
Alexander (left), Nikolay (center), and Stephan (right) Sobolev brothers against the backdrop of a sculpture and a photo of their father, Vladimir Sobolev, on his 110th anniversary (Novosibirsk, Russia, 2018).

Alexander Sobolev is one of four sons of geologist Vladimir Stepanovich Sobolev; his brothers include Nikolay Sobolev, Evgeny Sobolev and Stephan Sobolev.

== Career and research ==
A Physics Today news item about the (one-time) Wolfgang Paul Research Award programme lists Alexander V. Sobolev among the recipients and describes his work on mantle melting: "With a research focus on the origins of melts in Earth’s interior, Sobolev, a professor of geochemistry at the Russian Academy of Sciences’ Vernadsky Institute of Geochemistry in Moscow, has developed new approaches for studying the composition and nature of microscopic amounts of melts that are enclosed in the crystals of the mineral olivine. Based on results obtained through this analysis, he has created theories about the nature of melting and the composition of materials deep in Earth’s interior". The Alexander von Humboldt Foundation lists him in its network and records him as a recipient of the Humboldt Research Award (1999) and the Wolfgang Paul Research Award programme (2001).

In peer-reviewed publications, Sobolev and co-authors have reported results on melt inclusion compositions, primitive melts, mantle source heterogeneity and recycled components in mantle-derived magmas. This includes studies of plume-related magmatism, models for origin of Large Igneous Provinces and their impact on environmental catastrophes, deep-time volatile contents and markers of crustal recycling in the mantle.

According to Google Scholar as of January 4, 2026, Alexander Sobolev's papers have been cited more than 17,300 times in the scientific literature.

== Honours and awards ==
Selected honours documented by academic societies and major research organisations include:

- Geochemistry Fellow (2021), Geochemical Society and European Association of Geochemistry.
- Fellow, American Geophysical Union (2019).
- Full member (academician), Russian Academy of Sciences (elected 2016).
- Honorary member (membre honoraire), Institut universitaire de France (2015).
- Member, Academia Europaea (elected 2013).
- Gauss Professorship (2010).
- Humboldt Research Award (1999) and Wolfgang Paul Research Award (2001), Alexander von Humboldt Foundation.

== Selected works ==
- Vezinet, A.; Chugunov, A. V.; Sobolev, A. V.; Jain, C.; Sobolev, S. V.; Batanova, V. G. (2025). "Growth of continental crust and lithosphere subduction in the Hadean revealed by geochemistry and geodynamics". Nature Communications. 16 (1) 3850. Bibcode:2025NatCo..16.3850V. doi:10.1038/s41467-025-59024-6. PMC 12032353. PMID 40280901.
- Sobolev, A. V.; Asafov, E. V.; Gurenko, A. A.; Arndt, N. T.; Batanova, V. G.; Portnyagin, M. V.; Garbe-Schönberg, D.; Wilson, A. H.; Byerly, G. R. (2019). "Deep hydrous mantle reservoir provides evidence for crustal recycling before 3.3 Gyr ago". Nature. 571 (7766): 555–559. doi:10.1038/s41586-019-1399-5. PMID 31308535.
- Sobolev, A. V.; Asafov, E. V.; Gurenko, A. A.; Arndt, N. T.; Batanova, V. G.; Portnyagin, M. V.; Garbe-Schönberg, D.; Krasheninnikov, S. P. (2016). "Komatiites reveal an Archean hydrous deep-mantle reservoir". Nature. 531 (7596): 628–632. doi:10.1038/nature17152. PMID 27029278.
- Sobolev, S. V.; Sobolev, A. V.; Kuzmin, D. V.; Krivolutskaya, N. A.; Petrunin, A. G.; Arndt, N. T.; Radko, V. A.; Vasiliev, Y. R. (2011). "Linking mantle plumes, large igneous provinces and environmental catastrophes". Nature. 477 (7364): 312–316. Bibcode:2011Natur.477..312S. doi:10.1038/nature10385. PMID 21921914.
- Sobolev, A. V.; Hofmann, A. W.; Jochum, K. P.; Kuzmin, D. V.; Stoll, B. (2011). "A young source for the Hawaiian plume". Nature. 476 (7361): 434–437. Bibcode:2011Natur.476..434S. doi:10.1038/nature10321. PMID 21832996.
- Sobolev, A. V.; Hofmann, A. W.; Kuzmin, D. V.; Yaxley, G. M.; Arndt, N. T. (2007). "The amount of recycled crust in sources of mantle-derived melts". Science. 316 (5823): 412–417. Bibcode:2007Sci...316..412S. doi:10.1126/science.1138113. PMID 17395795.
- Sobolev, A. V.; Hofmann, A. W.; Sobolev, S. V.; Nikogosian, I. K. (2005). "An olivine-free mantle source of Hawaiian shield basalts". Nature. 434 (7033): 590–597. Bibcode:2005Natur.434..590S. doi:10.1038/nature03411. PMID 15800614.
- Sobolev, A. V.; Hofmann, A. W.; Nikogosian, I. K. (2000). "Recycled oceanic crust observed in 'ghost plagioclase' within the source of Mauna Loa lavas". Nature. 404 (6781): 986–990. Bibcode:2000Natur.404..986S. doi:10.1038/35010098. PMID 10801125.
- Sobolev, A. V. (1996). "Melt inclusions in minerals as a source of principal petrological information". Petrology. 4 (3): 209–220.
- Sobolev, A. V.; Shimizu, N. (1993). "Ultra-depleted primary melt included in an olivine from the Mid-Atlantic Ridge". Nature. 363 (6425): 151–154. Bibcode:1993Natur.363..151S. doi:10.1038/363151a0.
