= Hewlett-Woodmere Union Free School District =

School district in Nassau County, New York

The Hewlett-Woodmere Public School District, Union Free School District 14, is located in the southwest section of Nassau County, New York and borders the New York City borough of Queens.

Communities in the district include Hewlett Neck and Hewlett Bay Park, as well as portions of Hewlett, Hewlett Harbor, Lynbrook, South Valley Stream, Valley Stream, Woodmere, and Woodsburgh. It also includes sections of North Woodmere, an unincorporated area of Valley Stream, and in Valley Stream it specifically includes the Gibson section.

There are approximately 4,400 students enrolled in pre-K through 12th grade. The district is operated under the supervision of a seven-member Board of Education.

== History ==
The School District was created by the New York Legislature in 1898. As early as 1850 there was a one-room school house in the area.

== Schools ==
The district consists of the following schools:

Elementary schools

- Franklin Early Childhood Center grades Pre-K–1
- Hewlett Elementary School grades 2–5
- Ogden Elementary School grades 2–5

Middle school

- Woodmere Middle School grades 6–8

High school

- George W. Hewlett High School (commonly known as Hewlett High School) grades 9–12

== Administration ==
- Dr. Dina Anzalone – Superintendent

== Demographics ==
On December 3, 2006, Newsday reported that of 3,327 students, 84.3% are white, 1.8% are black 6.2% are Hispanic and 7.7% are "other."

== Awards and recognition ==
Recent awards and achievements include:

- Hewlett High School was named a Grammy Signature School semi-finalist for 2012.
