= Sobolevo, Sheksninsky District, Vologda Oblast =

Sobolevo Соболево
- Village
- Location within Vologda Oblast Location within Russia
- Coordinates: 59°04′N 38°32′E
- Country: Russia
- Region: Vologda Oblast
- District: Sheksninsky District
- Time zone: UTC+3:00

Sobolevo (Russian: Соболево) is a rural locality (a village) in Yurochenskoye Rural Settlement, Sheksninsky District, Vologda Oblast, Russia. The population was 7 as of 2002.

== Geography ==
Sobolevo is located 21 km south of Sheksna (the district's administrative centre) by road. Maryino is the nearest rural locality.
