= Sobolevo, Ivanovo Oblast =

Sobolevo Соболево
- Village
- Location within Ivanovo Oblast Location within Russia
- Coordinates: 57°15′N 43°01′E
- Country: Russia
- Region: Ivanovo Oblast
- District: Yuryevetsky District
- Time zone: UTC+3:00

Sobolevo (Russian: Соболево) is a rural locality (a selo) in Yuryevetsky District, Ivanovo Oblast, Russia. Population: 480 (2010 census);

== Geography ==
This rural locality is located 8 kilometres (5.0 mi) from Yuryevets (the district's administrative centre), 127 kilometres (79 mi) from Ivanovo (capital of Ivanovo Oblast) and 366 kilometres (227 mi) from Moscow. Yuryevo is the nearest rural locality.
