= Sobal =

Sobal (Belarusian: Собаль) is a surname. Notable people with the surname include:

- Alyaksandr Sobal (born 1982), Belarusian footballer
- Yauhen Sobal (born 1981), Belarusian cyclist

== See also ==
- Sobol (surname)
