= Sobel (disambiguation) =

Sobel is a surname.

Sobel may also refer to:

- Sobel (Sierra Leone), term describing Sierra Leone Army soldiers that allied with enemy rebels to loot civilians during the Sierra Leone Civil War
- Sobel operator, used in digital image processing, particularly within edge detection algorithms
- Sobel test, in statistics
- Sobell (disambiguation)
- Sobol (disambiguation)
