= Sobolevsky District =

Sobolevsky District Соболевский район (Russian)
- District
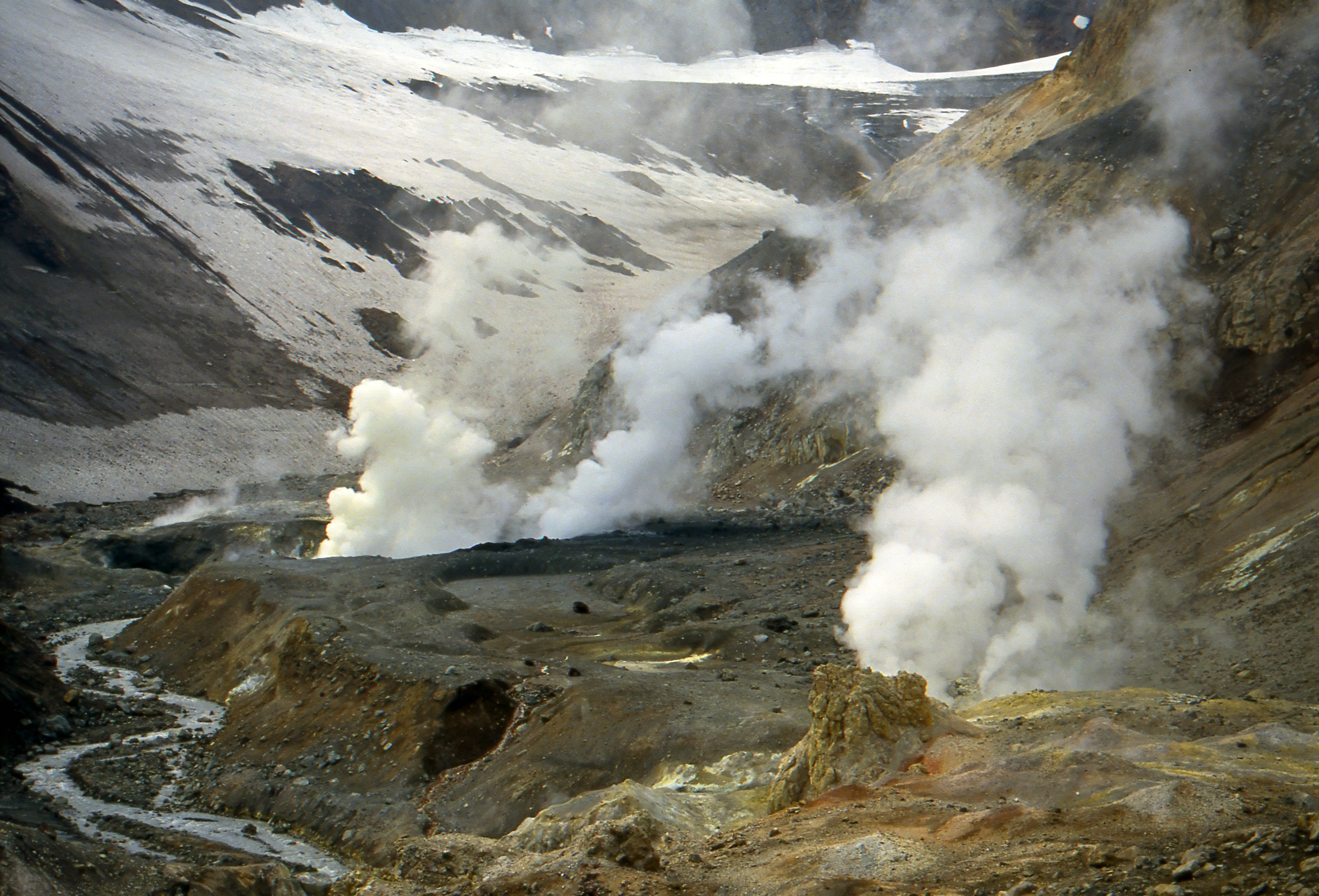
- Fumarole in Mutnovsky Volcano, Sobolevsky District, Kamchatka

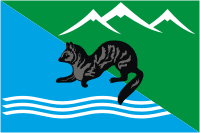
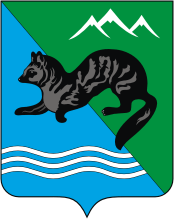
- Flag Coat of arms
- Location of Sobolevsky District in Kamchatka Krai
- Coordinates: 54°18′18″N 155°55′59″E
- Country: Russia
- Federal subject: Kamchatka Krai
- Established: 1 April 1946
- Administrative center: Sobolevo

Area
  - Total: 21,076 km^{2} (8,137 sq mi)

Population (2010 Census)
  - Total: 2,604
  - Density: 0.1236/km^{2} (0.3200/sq mi)
  - Urban: 0%
  - Rural: 100%

Administrative structure
  - Inhabited localities: 4 rural localities

Municipal structure
  - Municipally incorporated as: Sobolevsky Municipal District
  - Municipal divisions: 0 urban settlements, 2 rural settlements
- Time zone: UTC+12 (MSK+9)
- OKTMO ID: 30613000
- Website: https://sobolevomr.ru/

Sobolevsky District (Russian: Со́болевский райо́н) is an administrative and municipal district (raion) of Kamchatka Krai, Russia, one of the eleven in the krai. It is located in the southwest of the krai. The area of the district is 21,076 square kilometers (8,137 sq mi). Its administrative center is the rural locality (a selo) of Sobolevo. Population: 2,604 (2010 census); 3,221 (2002 census); 6,079 (1989 Soviet census). The population of Sobolevo accounts for 68.1% of the district's total population.
