= Vladimir Sobolev (geologist) =

Soviet geologist (1908–1982)

Vladimir Stepanovich Sobolev
- Владимир Степанович Соболев
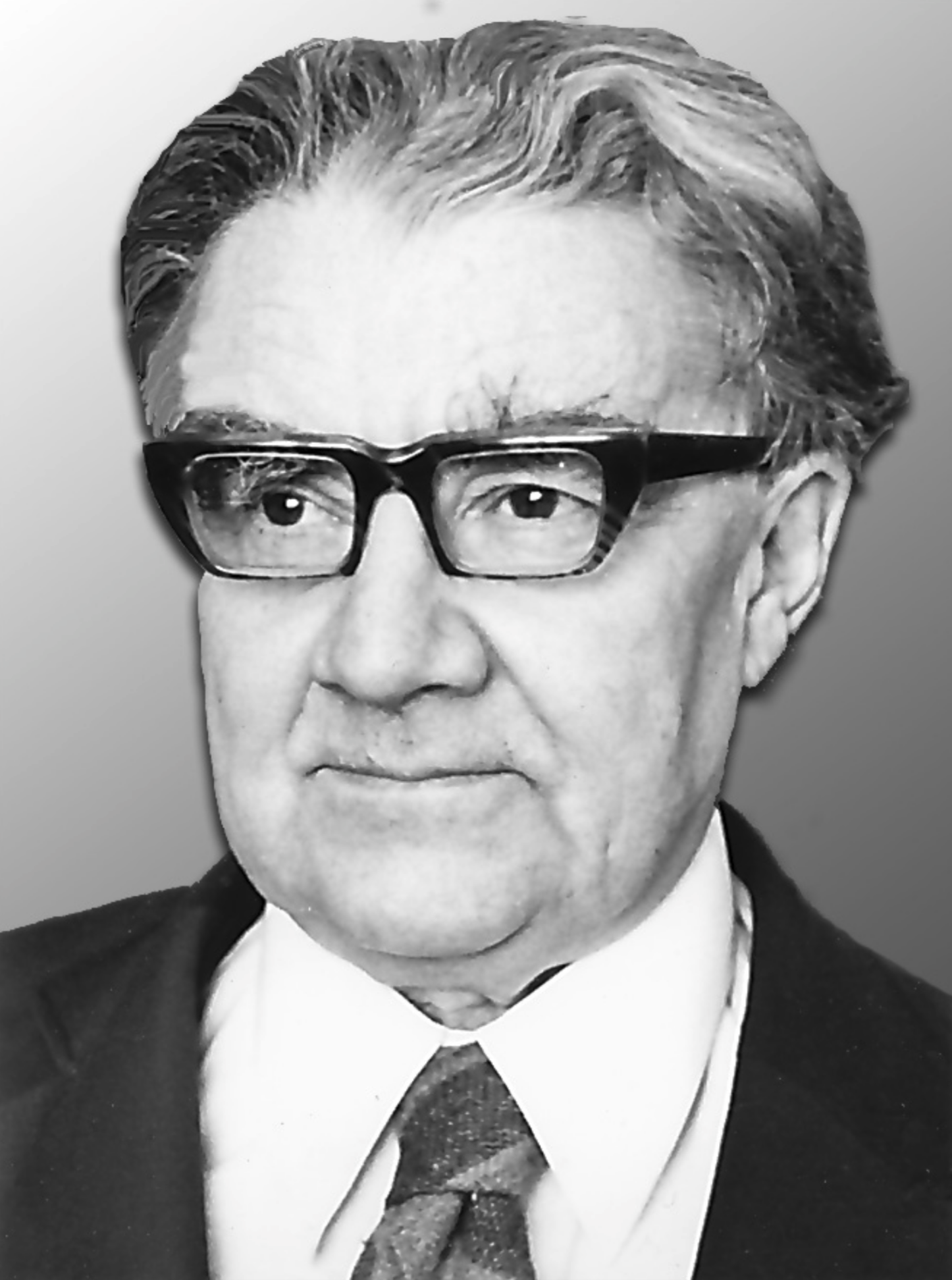
- Sobolev in 1976
- Born: 30 May 1908; Luhansk, Russian Empire (now Ukraine)
- Died: 1 September 1982 (aged 74); Moscow, Russian SFSR, Soviet Union
- Education: Leningrad Mining Institute
- Known for: Metamorphic facies; Prediction of diamond deposits in Eastern Siberia
- Awards: Hero of Socialist Labour; Lenin Prize; Stalin Prize
- Scientific career
- Fields: Petrology, Mineralogy, Geochemistry
- Workplaces: Leningrad Mining Institute; Lviv State University; Institute of Geology and Geophysics (Siberian Branch of the USSR Academy of Sciences); Fersman Mineralogical Museum

Vladimir Stepanovich Sobolev (Russian: Владимир Степанович Соболев; 30 May 1908 – 1 September 1982) was a Soviet geologist, petrologist and mineralogist, Academician of the USSR Academy of Sciences (1966), Hero of Socialist Labour (1978), and laureate of the Lenin Prize and the Stalin Prize. He was one of the founders of modern Soviet petrology and metamorphic geology and a pioneer in applying facies concepts to large-scale geological mapping. Sobolev was the first to predict the presence of diamond-bearing kimberlites in Eastern Siberia, a forecast later confirmed by discoveries in the 1950s.

== Biography ==
=== Early life and education ===
Sobolev was born on 30 May 1908 in Luhansk, then part of the Russian Empire. He graduated from the Leningrad Mining Institute in 1930. He received the Doctor of Geological and Mineralogical Sciences degree in 1938 and became a professor in 1939.

=== Work in Lviv (1945–1958) ===
After World War II Sobolev worked at the Institute of Mineral Resources of the Academy of Sciences of the Ukrainian SSR and simultaneously served as head of the Chair of Petrology at Lviv State University from 1945 to 1958. His studies during this period expanded the theoretical foundations of metamorphism, mineral equilibria and petrogenesis.

=== Novosibirsk period (1958–1981) ===
In 1958 Sobolev moved to Novosibirsk and became deputy director of the Institute of Geology and Geophysics of the Siberian Branch of the USSR Academy of Sciences. From 1960 he headed the Department of Petrology and Mineralogy of Novosibirsk State University, and from 1962 to 1971 he served as Dean of the Geological Faculty.

=== Moscow period (1981–1982) ===
In 1981 Sobolev moved to Moscow to become Director of the Fersman Mineralogical Museum of the USSR Academy of Sciences. He died on 1 September 1982 and was buried at the Kuntsevo Cemetery in Moscow.

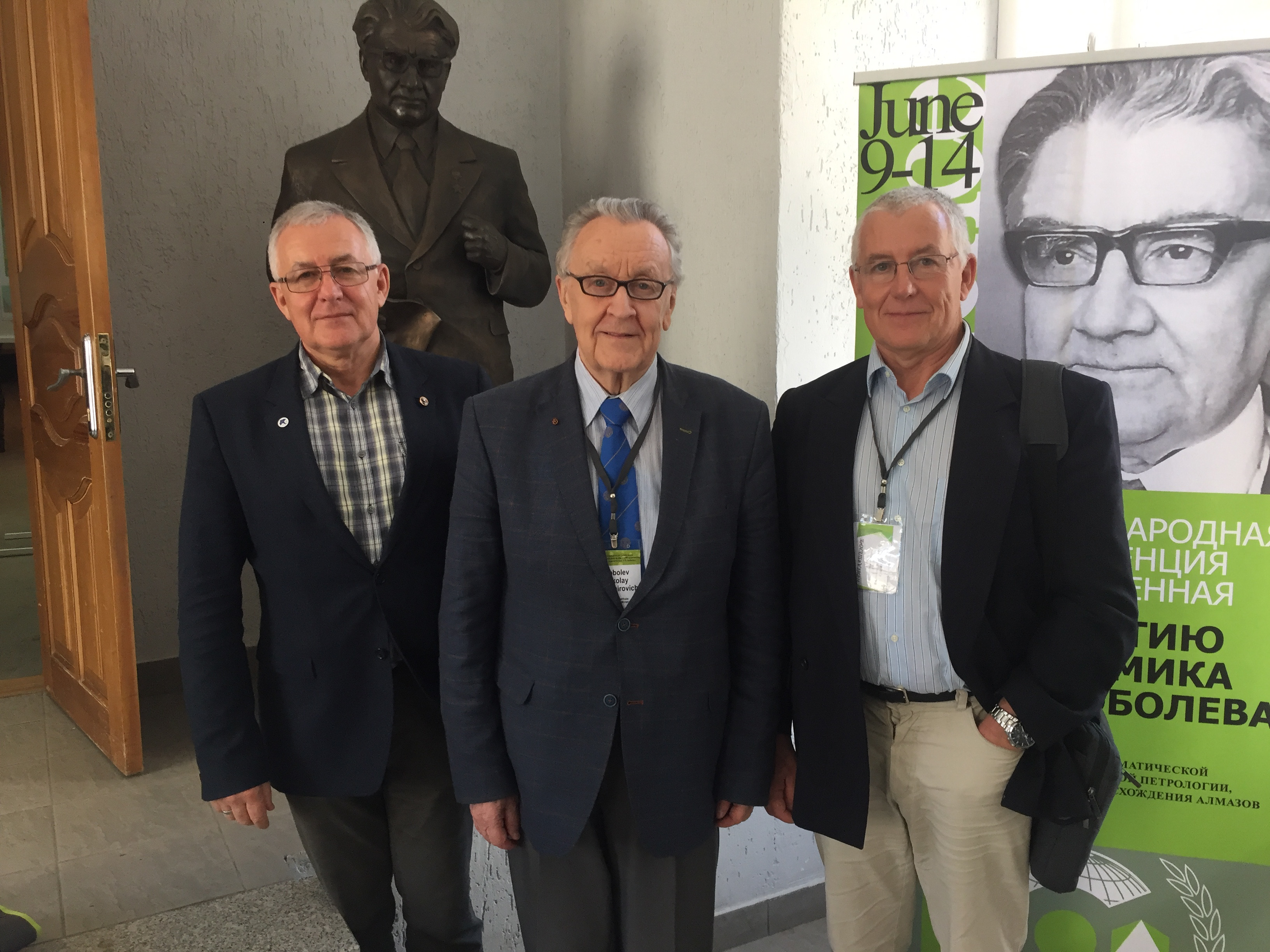
Vladimir Sobolev's sons, Alexander (left), Nikolay (center), and Stephan (right), in front of the sculpture of Vladimir Sobolev and a poster dedicated to him on his 110th Anniversary. Novosibirsk, Russia, 2018.

== Family ==
Sister: Olga Stepanovna Soboleva 1912–1989; Wife: Olga Vladimirovna Soboleva (Poplavskaya) 1914–1969; Sons: Nikolay Sobolev 1935–2022, Evgeny Sobolev 1936–1994, Stephan Sobolev 1954, Alexander Sobolev 1954.

== Scientific contributions ==
=== Prediction of diamond deposits in Siberia ===
Sobolev was one of the first scientists to propose that Eastern Siberia should host diamond-bearing kimberlite pipes, based on petrological and geodynamic reasoning. His recommendations guided geological surveys that led in 1954 to the discovery of the first Yakutian kimberlite pipe and subsequently major diamond deposits.

=== Metamorphic facies ===
Sobolev was a co-founder of the Soviet school of metamorphic facies. He defined the boundaries of high- and moderate-pressure metamorphic facies, and contributed to the compilation of metamorphic facies maps of the USSR (1966) and Europe (1974).

=== General and silicate mineralogy ===
Sobolev advanced the theoretical and physico-chemical foundations of mineral equilibria and igneous petrology. His textbooks and monographs, particularly on silicate mineralogy and metamorphic facies, became influential references in Soviet geology.

== Major works ==
- Petrology of the Traps of the Siberian Platform (1936)
- Petrology of the Eastern Part of the Korosten Pluton (1947)
- Introduction to Silicate Mineralogy (1949) — awarded the Stalin Prize (Second Degree)
- Geology of Diamond Deposits of Africa, Australia, Borneo and North America (1951)
- Physico-Chemical Foundations of the Petrography of Igneous Rocks (1961, with A. N. Zavaritsky)
- Facies of Metamorphism (1970)
- Facies of Regional Metamorphism of Moderate Pressures (1972)
- Facies of Regional Metamorphism of High Pressures (1974)

== Awards and honours ==
- Hero of Socialist Labour (1978)
- Order of Lenin (1967, 1978)
- Order of the Red Banner of Labour (1955)
- Lenin Prize (1976)
- Stalin Prize (Second Degree) (1950)
- Medal For Valiant Labour in the Great Patriotic War 1941–1945
- Honoured Scientist of the Yakut ASSR (1967)
- President of International Mineralogical Association 1974–1978.

== Legacy ==
- The Sobolev Institute of Geology and Mineralogy (Siberian Branch of the Russian Academy of Sciences, Novosibirsk) is named after him.
- The mineral sobolevite (1983) was named in his honour.
- A large diamond (59.20 carats) found in 1989 in the Udachnaya pipe was named "Academician Vladimir Sobolev".
- A scientific prize for young researchers in the Siberian Branch of the Academy of Sciences bears his name.
- A street in Mirny (Sakha Republic) is named after him.
- An auditorium at Novosibirsk State University commemorates him.
