= Sobolew =

Sobolew may refer to the following places in Poland:

- Sobolew, Lower Silesian Voivodeship (south-west Poland)
- Sobolew, Lublin Voivodeship (east Poland)
- Sobolew, Masovian Voivodeship (east-central Poland)

== See also ==
- Sobolev
