= Sobolevo, Ustyuzhensky District, Vologda Oblast =

Sobolevo Соболево
- Village
- Location within Vologda Oblast Location within Russia
- Coordinates: 58°49′N 36°32′E
- Country: Russia
- Region: Vologda Oblast
- District: Ustyuzhensky District
- Time zone: UTC+3:00

Sobolevo (Russian: Соболево) is a rural locality (a village) and the administrative center of Soshnevskoye Rural Settlement, Ustyuzhensky District, Vologda Oblast, Russia. The population was 348 as of 2002. There are 6 streets.

== Geography ==
Sobolevo is located 6 km (3.7 mi) southeast of Ustyuzhna (the district's administrative centre) by road. Timofeyevskoye is the nearest rural locality.
