= August 1966 =

Month of 1966

<<	August 1966					>>
Su	Mo	Tu	We	Th	Fr	Sa
	1	2	3	4	5	6
7	8	9	10	11	12	13
14	15	16	17	18	19	20
21	22	23	24	25	26	27
28	29	30	31

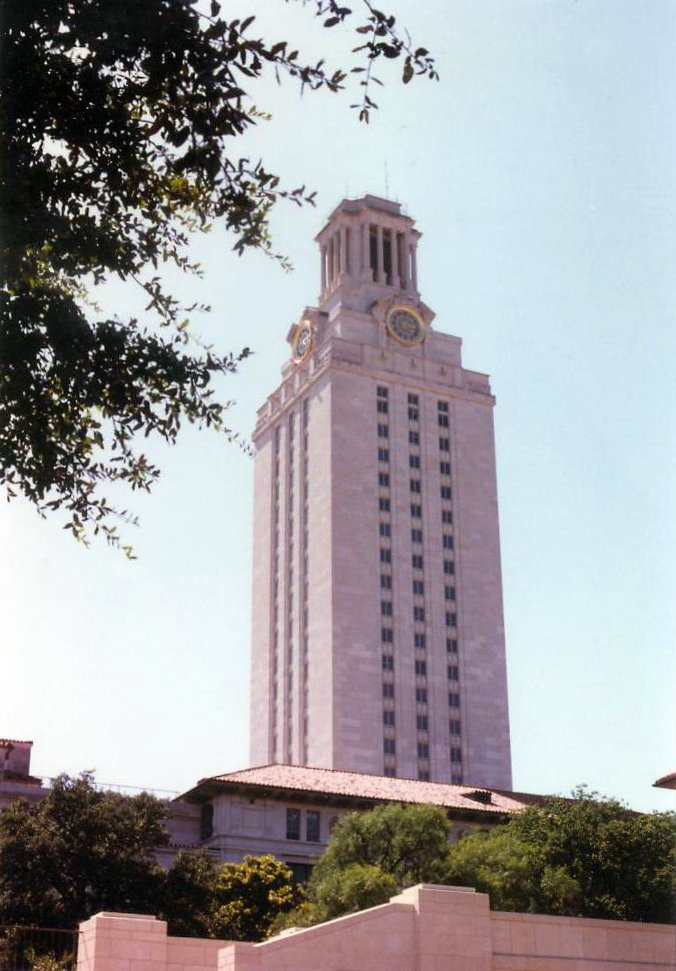
August 1, 1966: Sniper shoots 47 people from the Texas Tower

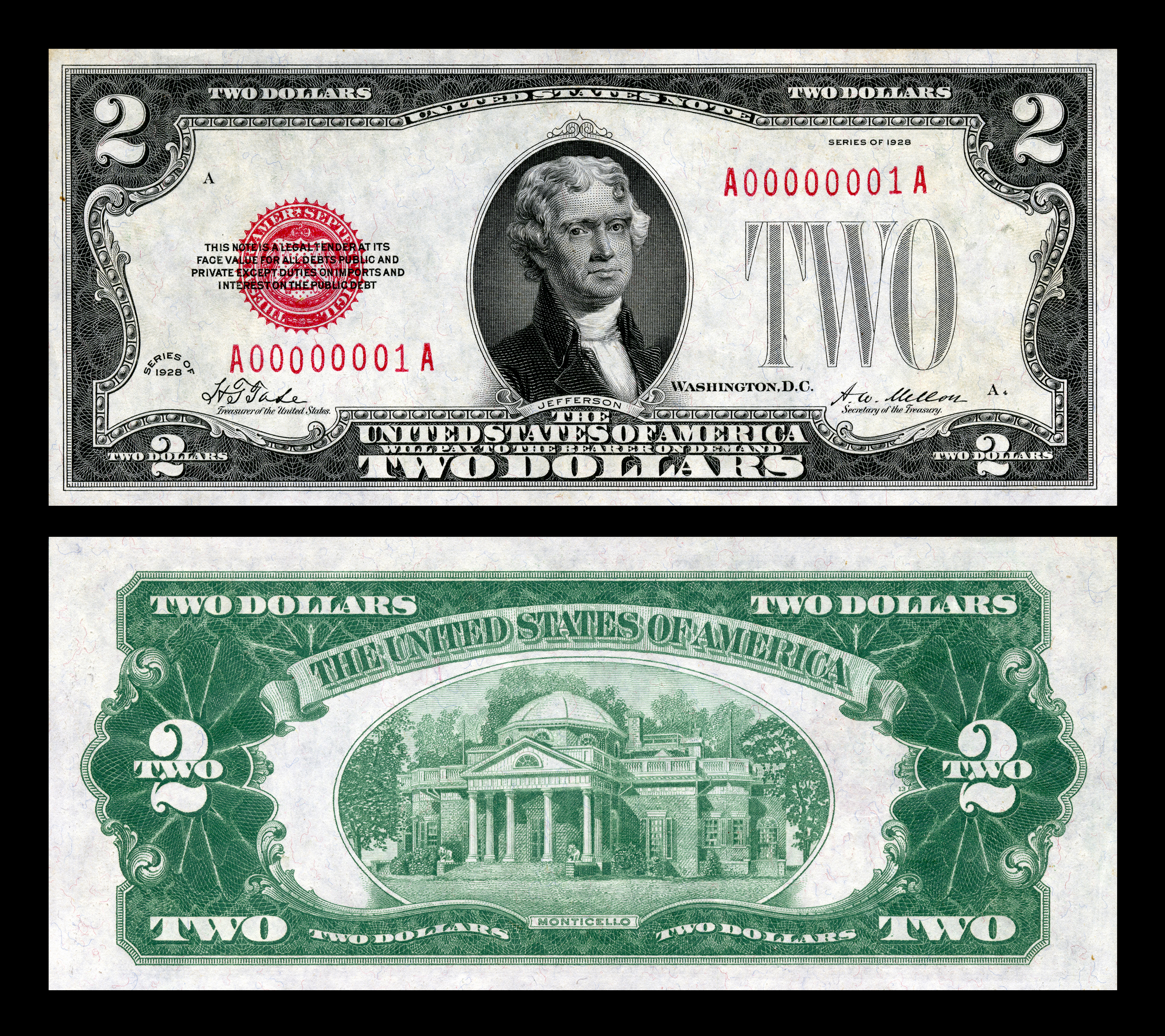
August 10, 1966: U.S. 2-dollar bill retired

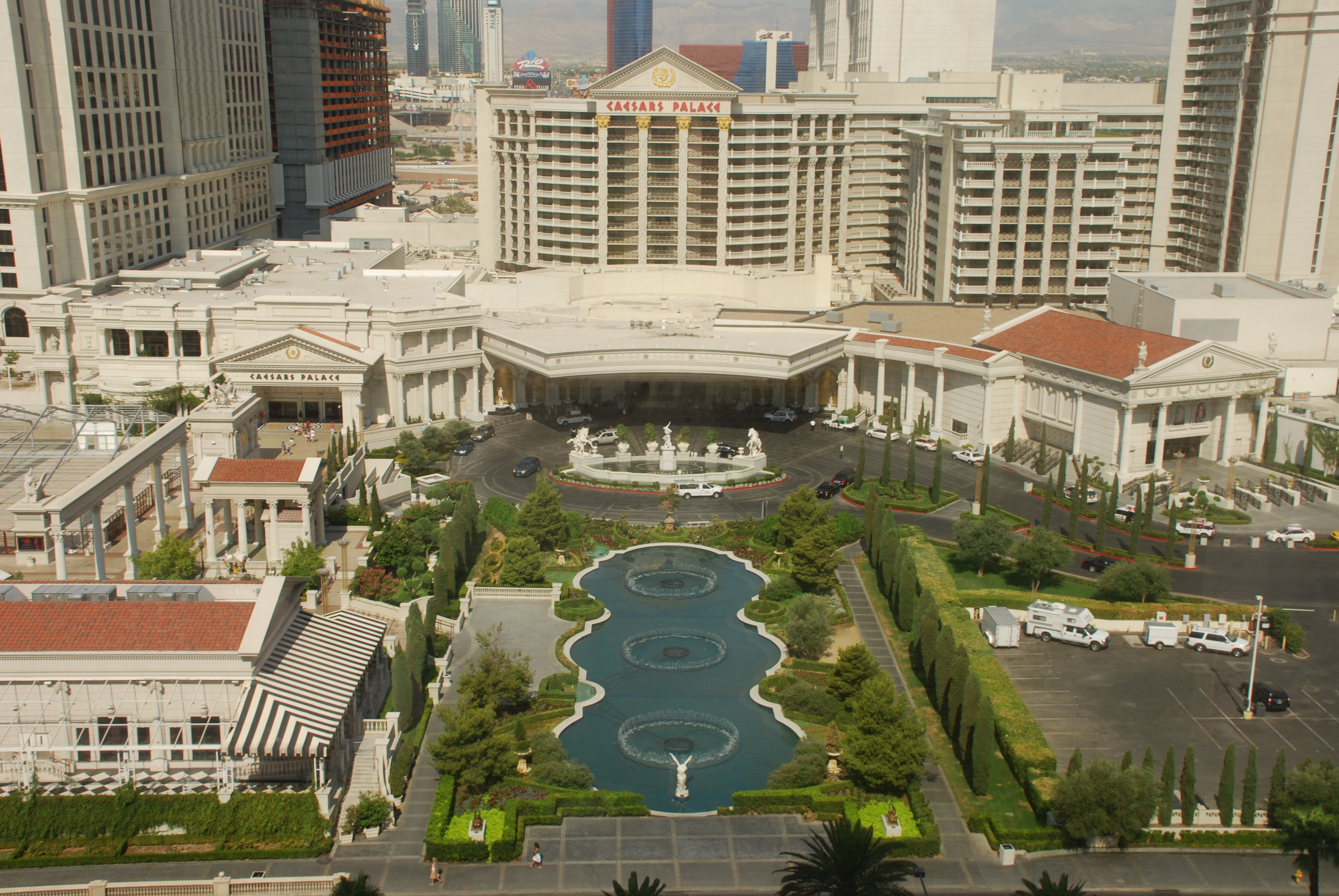
August 5, 1966: Caesars Palace opens in Las Vegas

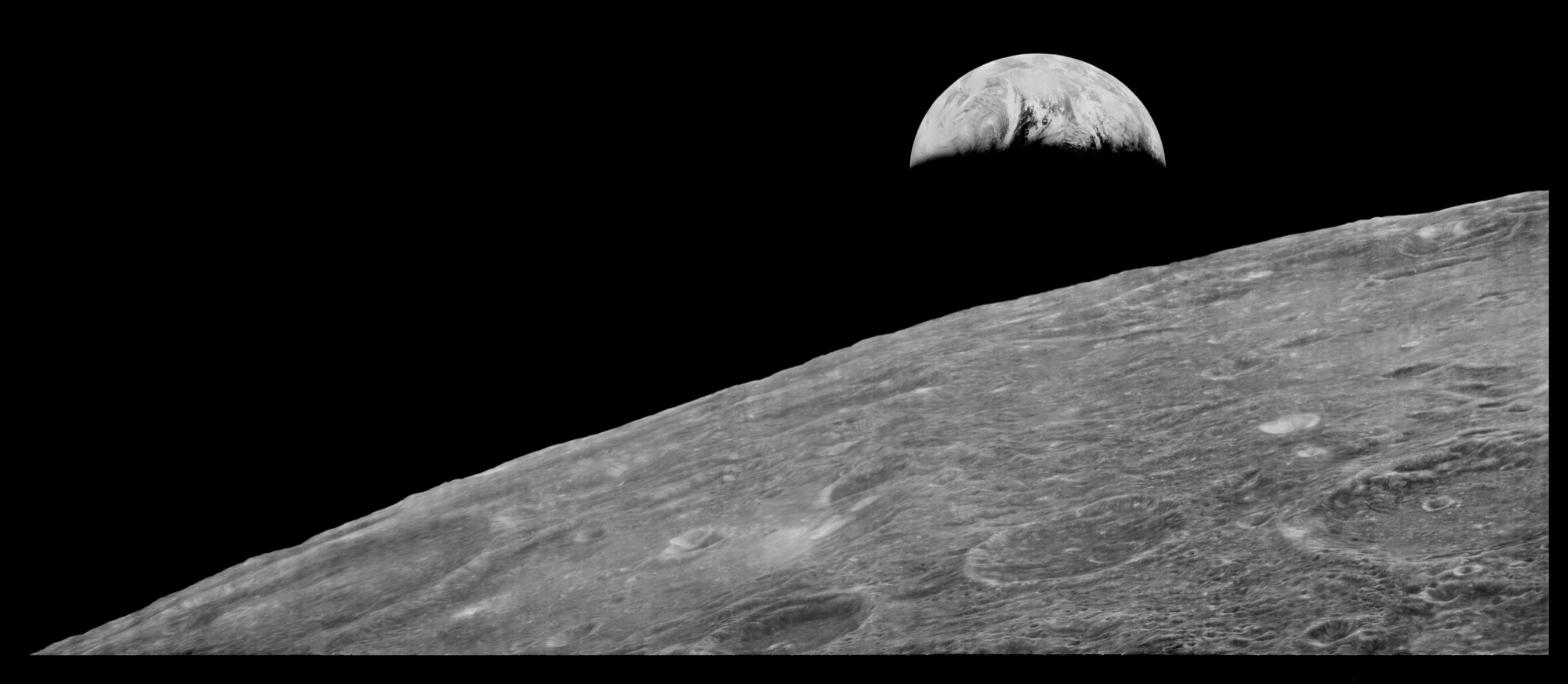
August 26, 1966: NASA releases first view of Earth from the Moon

The following events occurred in August 1966:

== August 1, 1966 (Monday) ==
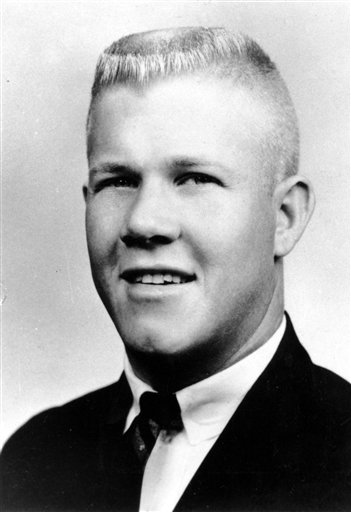
Whitman

- Sixteen people were shot to death, and 31 wounded, by Charles Whitman, a student at the University of Texas at Austin and a former U.S. Marine sniper, who was firing from the observation deck on the 28th floor of the tower overlooking the campus. Prior to the shooting, Whitman had stabbed his mother and his wife to death in order to spare them "the embarrassment" his actions would cause. At 11:48 a.m., Whitman began shooting victims at random, and was not stopped until 96 minutes later, when policemen Ramiro Martinez and Houston McCoy were able to reach the sniper's perch and kill him. An autopsy showed later that Whitman had a brain tumor.
- After three days of confusion about the whereabouts of kidnapped President Ironsi, General Yakubu Gowon became the President of Nigeria.

== August 2, 1966 (Tuesday) ==
- The station manager of WAQY-AM radio in Birmingham, Alabama, became the first to urge listeners to boycott record stores and bookstores that sold music and memorabilia of The Beatles, starting an American backlash against the British rock group that was preparing to make a tour of the United States. Manager Tommy Charles told reporters, "We just felt it was so absurd and sacrilegious that something ought to be done to show that they cannot get away with this sort of thing." On March 4, John Lennon had been quoted by a British interviewer as saying, "We're more popular than Jesus now", and the statement had largely gone unnoticed until it was reprinted in the July issue of the American teen magazine Datebook. On July 28, Charles and disc jockey Doug Layton stopped playing the group's records and announced plans for a bonfire of records on July 30. Other radio stations joined in the boycott, including in South Africa and Spain, before Lennon made an apology when the group arrived in Chicago on August 11.
- Nigeria's new president, Lt. Yakubu Gowon, announced the immediate release of political prisoners who had been incarcerated during the Balewa regime. The most prominent of the men to go free were Chief Obafemi Awolowo and Chief Anthony Enahoro, who had been jailed since 1962 for conspiracy against the Balewa government.
- Unopposed, Alexei Kosygin received a unanimous "yes" vote for a four-year term as Prime Minister of the Soviet Union, in voting by the 1,517 members of both houses of the Supreme Soviet parliament. Officially, the result for Kosygin was 767–0 in the Soviet of the Union, and 750–0 in the Soviet of Nationalities.
- The Soviet Union's Sukhoi Su-17 attack aircraft made its first flight, with Vladimir Ilyushin at the controls, becoming the first Soviet variable geometry aircraft.
- George E. Mueller, of NASA proposed that the Apollo Telescope Mount (ATM) of the Apollo spacecraft should be mounted on a rack on the Apollo Lunar Module descent stage or attached directly to the Command Service Module (CSM), with development to begin immediately to be ready for the 1968–1969 period of maximum solar activity. Mueller also recommended that NASA proceed with developing an S-IVB airlock module (AM) experiment as part of the proposed dual-launch Apollo-Saturn 209-210 mission. The AM, a tube structure 4.5 metres (15 ft) long and 3 metres (9.8 ft) in diameter, would have a docking adapter at one end for the CSM and a sealed connection at the other end to a hatch to provide an oxygen-pressurized passageway for the crew and to create a "shirt-sleeve" environment. NASA Administrator James E. Webb endorsed the airlock module experiment, commenting that the module "would open up additional areas of knowledge we might need if Russian programs accelerate to the degree that we wish to add to our manned operations with the least lead time."
- Born: Tim Wakefield, American baseball pitcher; in Melbourne, Florida (died from brain cancer, 2023)
- Died: Boyd Raeburn, 52, American jazz bandleader, died of a heart attack

== August 3, 1966 (Wednesday) ==
- A U.S. Navy board of inquiry recommended a court-martial for Captain Archie C. Kuntze for misconduct during his two years as commander of the supply depot operations within South Vietnam. Captain Kuntze, who called himself "The American Mayor of Saigon", would be convicted on November 14 of lesser charges involving a romantic affair and would receive a reprimand.
- A radio broadcast by China's Prime Minister Zhou Enlai in Ürümqi called on the people of the multi-ethnic Xinjiang Uyghur Autonomous Region to support the Cultural Revolution. Within a month, the predominantly Sunni Muslim Uyghurs would be under the persecution of the mostly Han Chinese Red Guards.
- Born: Brent Butt, Canadian comedian; in Tisdale, Saskatchewan

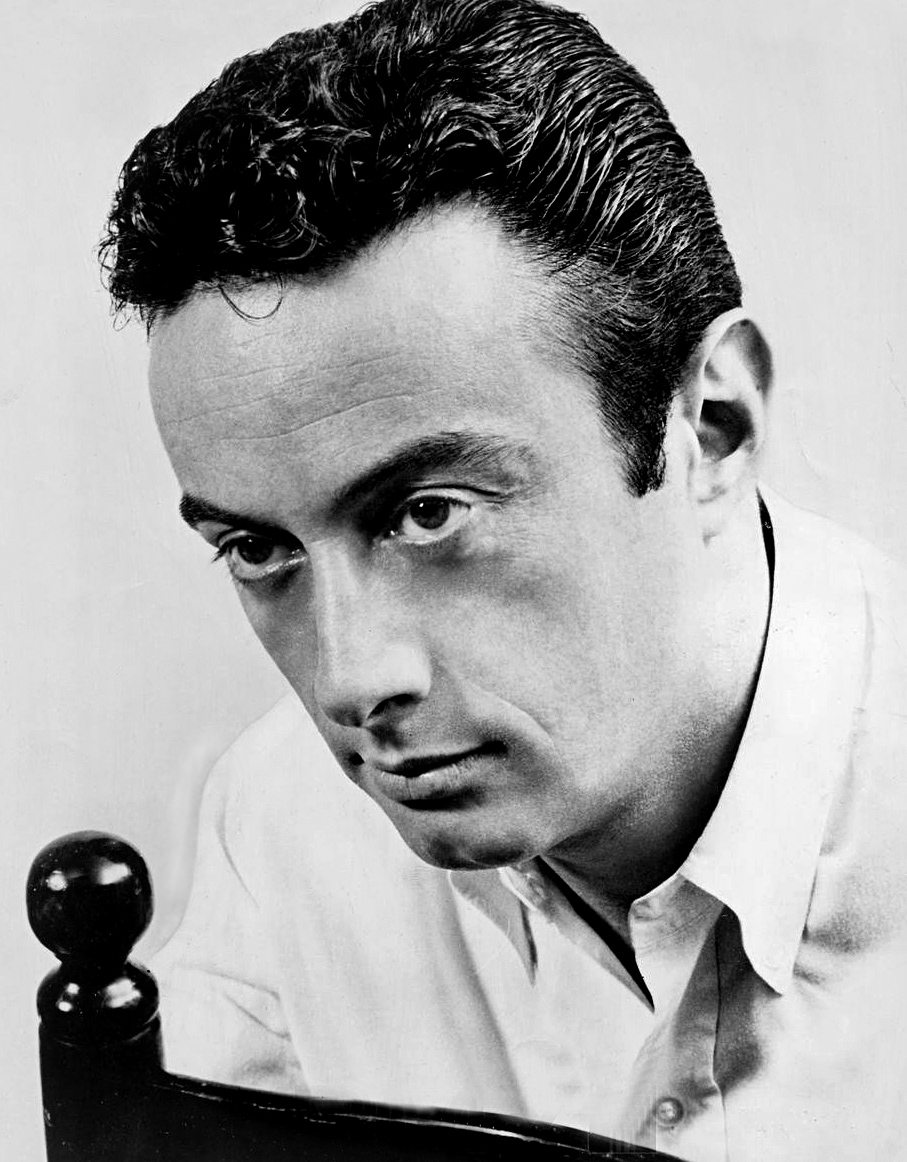
Bruce

- Died:
  - Lenny Bruce, 40, American comedian, died from an overdose of morphine. Bruce was found in the bathroom at his home at 8825 Hollywood Boulevard in Hollywood, California, reportedly with the needle of his syringe still lodged in his arm. The day before, he had received a foreclosure notice on the house.
  - René Schick Gutiérrez, 56, President of Nicaragua since 1963, died of a heart attack inside the Presidential Palace at Managua. He was succeeded by Vice President Lorenzo Guerrero the following day.

== August 4, 1966 (Thursday) ==
- The 1966 British Empire and Commonwealth Games opened in Kingston, Jamaica, the first time that the Games had been held outside the "White Dominions".
- The FIS Alpine World Ski Championships 1966 opened in Portillo, Chile.
- Born:
  - Leonid Rozhetskin, Russian financier and lawyer; in Leningrad, Soviet Union (kidnapped and murdered, 2008)
  - Alan Martin, British comics writer best known as author of the comic strip Tank Girl; in Worthing, Sussex
- Died: Helen Tamiris, 64, American choreographer

== August 5, 1966 (Friday) ==
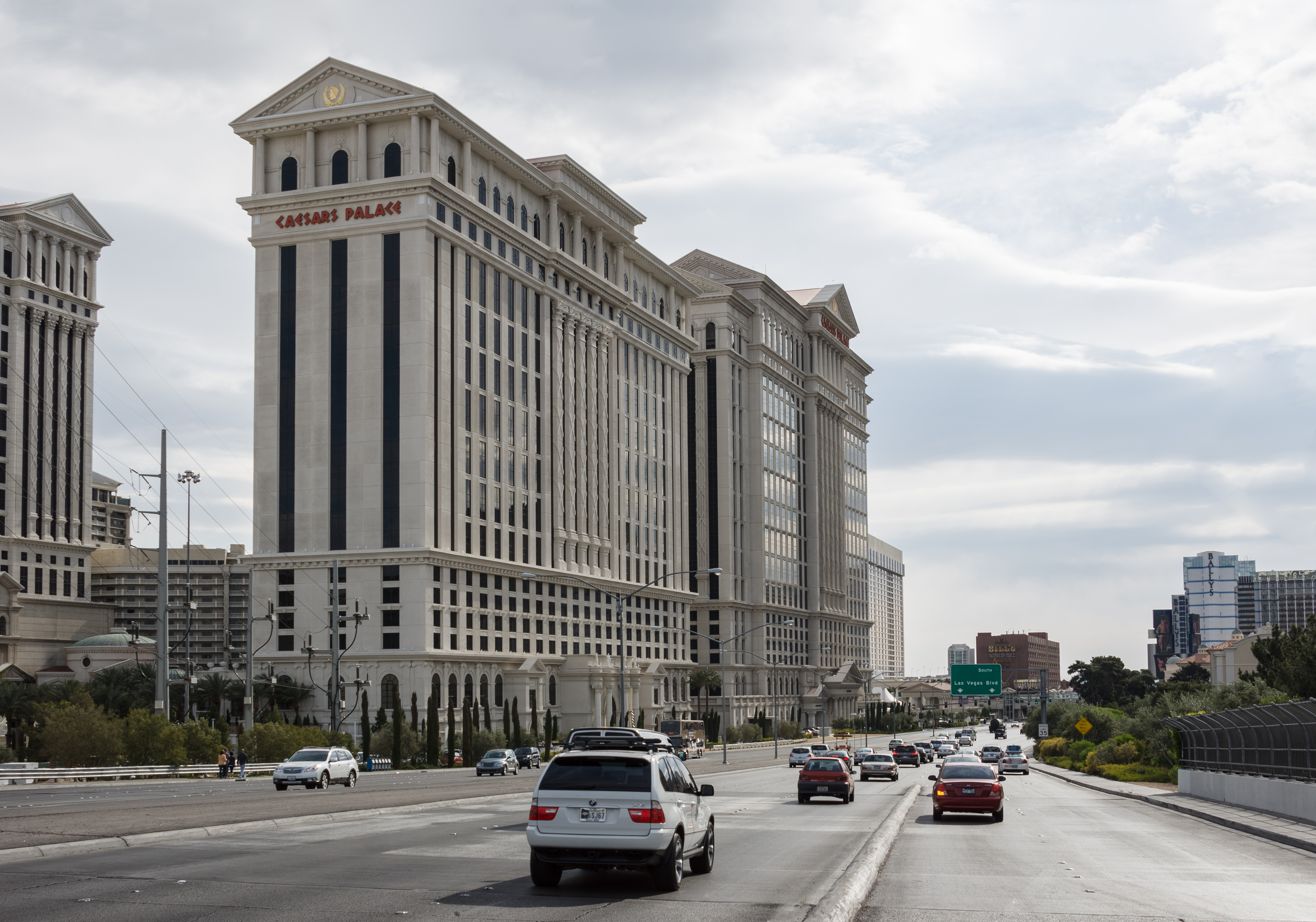
Caesars Palace from Flamingo Road

- The Caesars Palace hotel and casino opened in Las Vegas and "set a new standard of luxury for the Nevada casino-resort industry"; owner Jay Sarno said that he was tired of "Wild West themes" in Nevada casinos and wanted to recreate the opulence of the Roman Empire during the "Age of the Caesars". In his last public appearance before his August 23 death, Francis X. Bushman was the official greeter and dressed in the outfit that he wore in the 1925 silent film version of Ben-Hur.
- China's leader, Mao Zedong, authored his statement "Bombard the Headquarters" in the form of a big-character poster (da zi bao) place on the wall of the Zhongnanhai, the residential compound for the highest-ranking Communist Party officials. The official endorsement of the Cultural Revolution and the grassroots work of the young students in the Red Guards would be described enthusiastically by the Red Guards of Nankai University in 1968 as "the shot that shook up the whole world... a salvo that opened up a whole new chapter in human history". On the same day, Bian Zhongyun, vice-principal of the girls' high school associated with Beijing Normal University, became the first person killed in beatings by the Red Guards; she reportedly was beaten to death with wooden sticks by her students.
- Groundbreaking took place for the World Trade Center in New York City, as jackhammers began breaking pavement at the former site of Radio Row. The first placement of steel construction would begin two years later (August 1968), and the first of the 110-story Twin Towers, WTC 1, would house its first tenants in December, 1970, followed by the opening of WTC 2 in January 1972. Formal dedication would take place on April 4, 1973, and the two towers were later destroyed in a terrorist attack on September 11, 2001.
- The Soviet Union protested against damage to one of its merchant ships in a North Vietnamese port, caused by American air attacks. The Soviet diesel vessel Medyn had been moored in Haiphong harbor when it was struck by large caliber bullets during an American air raid on August 2. Foy D. Kohler, the U.S. Ambassador to Moscow, responded eight days later that the damage had actually been caused by anti-aircraft fire from the North Vietnamese side, and that the U.S. planes conducted no strafing operations.
- The Beatles' album Revolver was released in the United Kingdom by EMI Studios. It would be released by Capitol Records in the United States three days later, on August 8, but without three songs that had already appeared on the U.S. version of Yesterday and Today.

== August 6, 1966 (Saturday) ==
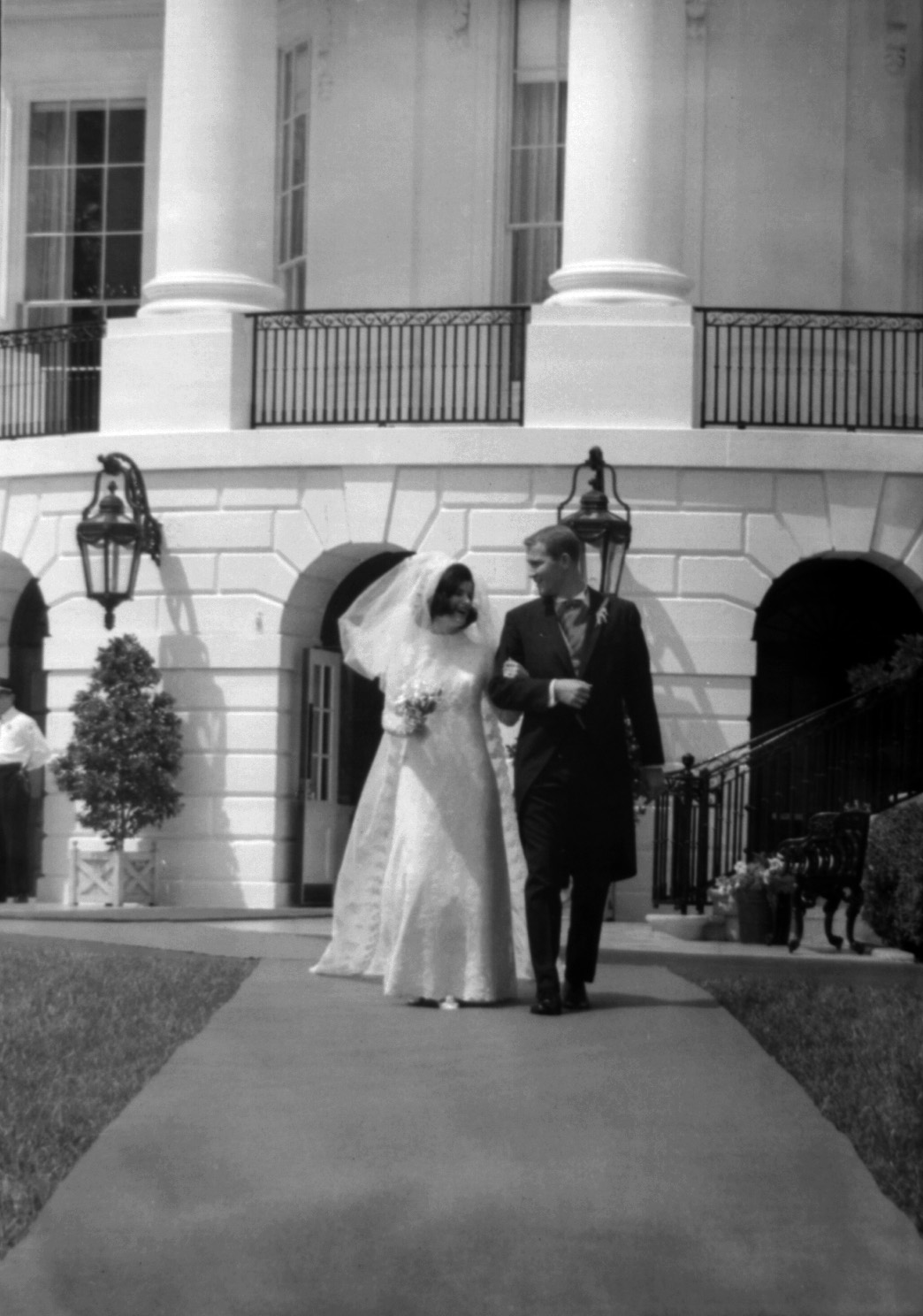
August 6, 1966: Luci Baines Johnson marries to Patrick J. Nugent

- Luci Baines Johnson, daughter of U.S. President Lyndon B. Johnson, was married to Patrick J. Nugent in the most important social event of the year in Washington, D.C., with a ceremony at the National Shrine of the Immaculate Conception and a post-wedding reception at the White House. The ceremonies were televised live on all three American networks.
- Braniff Flight 250, a BAC One-Eleven jet, crashed near Falls City, Nebraska, after losing its right wing, right stabilizer, and tailfin during severe air turbulence when it flew into an active squall line. All 38 passengers and four crew on board were killed. At 11:12 p.m., the jet, en route from Kansas City, Missouri, to Omaha, Nebraska, impacted on a farm in Richardson County, Nebraska, 10 miles (16 km) northeast of the town. A later investigation concluded that the probable cause of the accident was "operation of the aircraft in an area of avoidable hazardous weather", noting that the captain had been offered the option of flying around the storm rather than through it. An author would later call it "one of several important stepping-stones over a long period of developing a safer American commercial aviation inquiry" and note that "Flight 250's demise saw the first use of cockpit voice recorder technology in an aviation accident investigation". The release of the transcript on December 7 would be described as "undoubtedly the very first sound record of the actual crunching and crackling of an aircraft breaking apart under stress", with the last reported words being the Captain saying, "Ease power back..." as the sound of rushing air began. At 11:12:06 p.m., the tape made its last recording, of "a tremendous crash which was ground impact. No such final sound record ever was made before..."
- Shakhbut bin Sultan Al Nahyan, the wealthy, but erratic, ruler of the oil-rich sheikhdom of Abu Dhabi, was overthrown by members of his own family, and arrested with the assistance of the British paramilitary force, the Trucial Oman Scouts. At the time, Abu Dhabi and seven other sheikhdoms on the Arabian Peninsula were part of a British protectorate, the Trucial States. The new ruler, Shakhbut's younger brother Zayed bin Sultan Al Nahyan, would later unite the sheikdoms and become the first President of the United Arab Emirates in 1971.
- What was, at the time, the longest suspension bridge in Europe was inaugurated as the 3,233-foot (985 m) long Salazar Bridge over the Tagus River was opened to traffic and connected the wealthy industrial region to the north of Lisbon with the poorer southern half of Portugal. Named originally for the 79-year-old dictator of Portugal, Prime Minister António de Oliveira Salazar, the structure would be renamed the 25 de Abril Bridge following the April 25, 1974, revolution that would overthrow the military regime.
- Kenneth McDuff began the first of at least nine murders as a serial killer, when he kidnapped and shot three teenagers in Everman, Texas. Initially sentenced to death in the electric chair, the 20-year-old killer would have his sentence commuted to life imprisonment and would be paroled in 1989. Following his release, he would resume murdering people until being arrested again in 1992. He would be executed by lethal injection on November 17, 1998.
- René Barrientos was sworn in as the new President of Bolivia. He would serve until his death in a helicopter crash in 1969.
- Died: Cordwainer Smith (pen-name for Paul Linebarger), 53, American science fiction writer, died from a heart attack.

== August 7, 1966 (Sunday) ==
- Seven American warplanes were shot down in a single day over the skies of North Vietnam, the highest U.S. air loss since the war had begun. Previously, six aircraft had been downed on August 13, 1965. Five of the planes were F-105 Thunderchief fighter-bombers, worth $2,150,000 apiece. Within the space of a month, 25 of the F-105 planes— the equivalent of an entire U.S. Air Force squadron— had been shot down, mostly by anti-aircraft guns.
- Carlos Lleras Restrepo was inaugurated for a four-year term as the 22nd President of Colombia, succeeding Guillermo León Valencia. He would be described by one historian as "one of the most brilliant presidents of contemporary Colombia" and serve until August 7, 1970.
- Regular production began for a new car from General Motors, the Chevrolet Camaro. The first 1967 models would go on sale on September 29.
- Moktar Ould Daddah was re-elected without opposition as President of Mauritania.
- Died: Samuel J. Battle, 83, who had become the first African-American police officer in the history of the New York Police Department in 1911.

== August 8, 1966 (Monday) ==
- The "Sixteen Articles" was approved by the Central Committee of the Chinese Communist Party, becoming "the first published official document laying out Mao Zedong's radical policies as guidelines for the Cultural Revolution". Published nationwide the next day in the People's Daily, it was intended to "keep the revolution under control", but had the opposite effect, inspiring the zeal of China's teenagers and young people to years of violence. Among the directives it issued was a call to "change the mental outlook of the whole of society" and to "struggle against and crush those in authority who are taking the capitalist road". Any person identified as a capitalist roader (zǒu zīpài) was to be removed from authority, and "anti-Party, anti-socialists Rightists must be fully exposed, hit hard, pulled down, and completely discredited and their influence eliminated". The statement closed with the promise that "The Great Proletarian Cultural Revolution is bound to achieve brilliant victory under the leadership of the Central Committee of the Party headed by Mao Zedong."
- West German journalist Martina I. Kischke, a reporter for the newspaper Frankfurter Rundschau, was arrested by the Soviet KGB in the Kazakh SSR capital of Alma-Ata, where she was visiting her fiancé, government employee Boris Petrenko. Instead of talking about marriage, Petrenko handed her a pack of cigarettes and, 10 minutes later, KGB officials revealed that the pack contained "incriminating photographic material" and incarcerated her in the Lubyanka Prison at Moscow's KGB headquarters. Kischke would finally be released on December 23, along with three other West Germans, in exchange for former Bundestag member Alfred Frenzel, who had spied against West Germany on behalf of Czechoslovakia. Miss Kischke would report later that the KGB had returned all of her possessions except for the wedding dress that she had brought with her to Alma-Ata.
- Born: Chris Eubank, British boxer recognized from 1991 to 1995 as the super-middleweight boxing champion of the World Boxing Organization, one of four sanctioning organizations; in Dulwich, London
- Jimmy Wales, American co-founder of Wikipedia; in Huntsville, Alabama
- Died: Ed "Strangler" Lewis (stage name for Robert Friedrich), 71, American professional wrestler known for his innovations in the "sleeper hold"

== August 9, 1966 (Tuesday) ==
- President Yakubu "Jack" Gowon of Nigeria met with military governors from the nation's three regions, the Hausa-dominated Northern, the mostly Igbo Eastern region and the largely Yoruba Western Region, and concluded that all Nigerian Army personnel should be "redeployed to their respective regions of origin", which increased the likelihood of the breakup of the nation.
- Naji Talib was selected by the Ba'athist Party to be the new Prime Minister of Iraq. Three days earlier, his predecessor, Abd al-Rahman al-Bazzaz, had been forced to resign after having negotiated an agreement with Kurdish rebels.
- In the Republic of Singapore, the first annual National Day Parade was held, marking the first anniversary of Singapore's independence from Malaysia in 1965.
- Died:
  - Lee Bowers, 41, former employee of the Union Terminal Company in Dallas and a witness to the assassination of President John F. Kennedy whose observations suggested a conspiracy, was killed in a single-car accident in Midlothian, Texas, dying three hours after he crashed into a bridge abutment. In an article in Ramparts magazine two months later, the death of Bowers was cited as the tenth of "10 mysterious deaths" of people who had information concerning the events of November 22, 1963. The co-author of the article, Penn Jones Jr., was the editor of the Midlothian newspaper and urged that the investigation be reopened. However, other observers concluded that Bowers lost control of his car after having a heart attack.
  - Giorgi Leonidze, 66, Georgian poet and author

== August 10, 1966 (Wednesday) ==
- The U.S. Department of the Treasury announced that it would no longer print the United States two-dollar bill. The United States Mint had printed no new $2 bills since June 30, 1965. At the most recent count a year later 69,660,947 of the bills were in circulation, less than one-third of one percent of the total value of printed bills. The denomination had been created in July 1862, during the American Civil War, but the bills (with Thomas Jefferson on the obverse and his home, Monticello, on the reverse) were unpopular, and many people considered them to be unlucky. However, printing of the bills (with a new reverse side, showing the signing of the U.S. Declaration of Independence) would resume to celebrate the United States Bicentennial, and the bills would return on April 13, 1976, in honor of Jefferson's 233rd birthday.
- The cable for the Moscow–Washington hotline, that linked communications between the White House and the Kremlin, was accidentally severed by a Soviet freighter that was trying to pull another Soviet ship off of a sandbar off the coast of Denmark. However, the connection was lost for less than a minute, and re-routed immediately over another line.
- Lunar Orbiter 1, the first U.S. spacecraft to orbit the Moon, was launched from Cape Kennedy at 2:26 p.m., with an objective of taking photographs of nine potential sites for a crewed Moon landing.
- An East German court sentenced Günter Laudahn to life imprisonment for spying for the United States. Laudahn, who had escaped to West Germany in 1962, confessed in court that he had been employed by the U.S. Central Intelligence Agency (CIA) to persuade an East German pilot to fly the MiG-21 to the west so that it could be inspected. He was arrested shortly after his return to East Germany in May.
- Born: Hossam Hassan, Egyptian soccer football star and the national team's all-time scorer, with 69 goals in 169 appearances; in Cairo
- Died:
  - James Donald French, 30, American murderer, was executed in the electric chair at the Oklahoma State Penitentiary in McAlester. As early as 1977, it would be written that as French was being escorted to the death chamber, he told a newsman, "I have a terrific headline for you in the morning: 'French Fries'." Whether the story is true or not, newspapers the next day reported the story without the suggested headline.
  - J. C. Bloem, 79, Netherlands poet

== August 11, 1966 (Thursday) ==
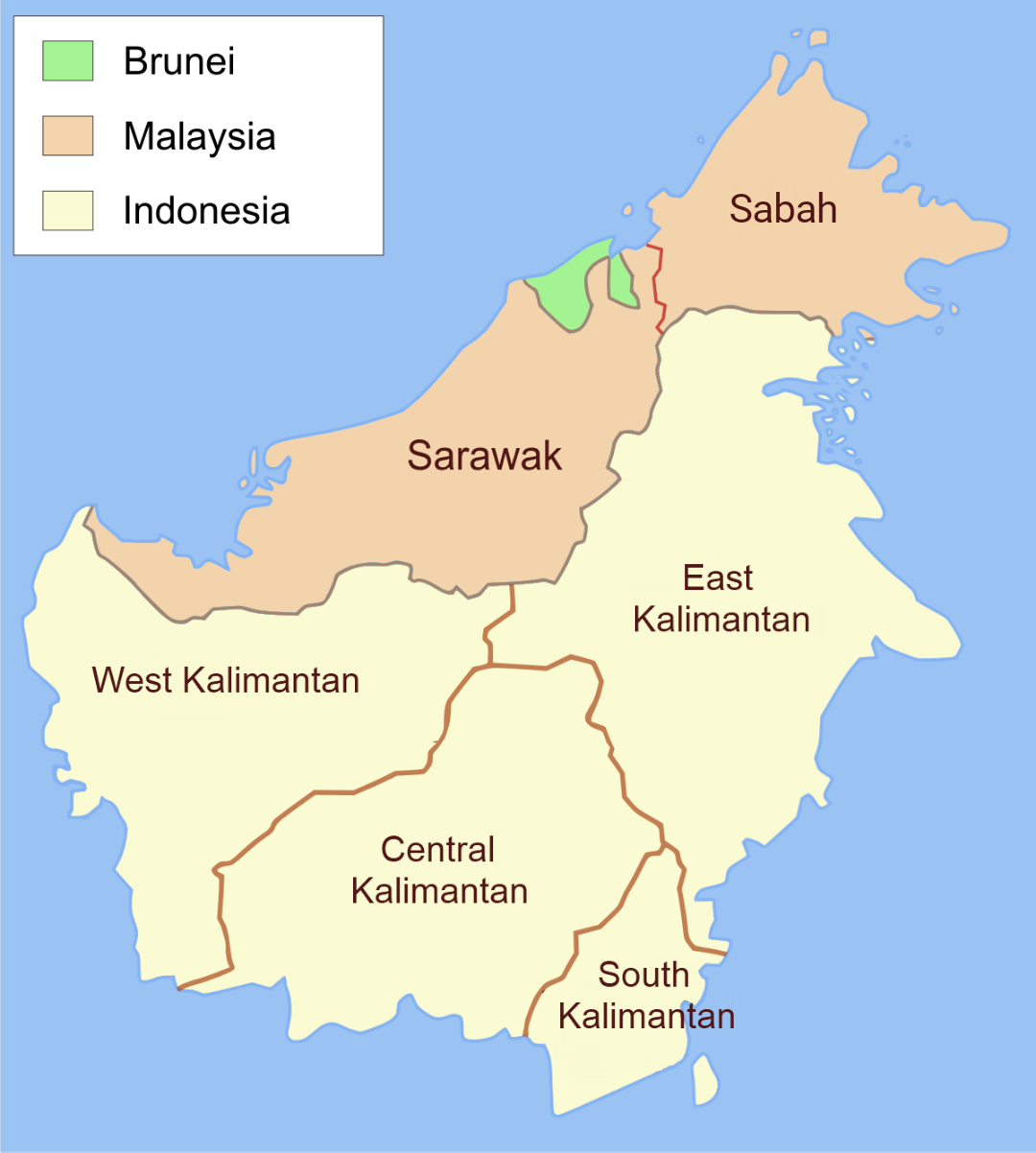
Borneo agreement

- The Konfrontasi, the war between Indonesia and Malaysia on the island of Borneo, formally came to an end in Jakarta, as the two warring nations signed the agreement that had been reached on May 29 in Bangkok. Fighting had broken out on January 20, 1963 and about 700 people had been killed in skirmishes over three and a half years. Malaysia's Prime Minister, Tun Abdul Razak Hussein, and Indonesia's military strongman, Suharto, executed the agreement after Razak had completed a visit with President Sukarno.

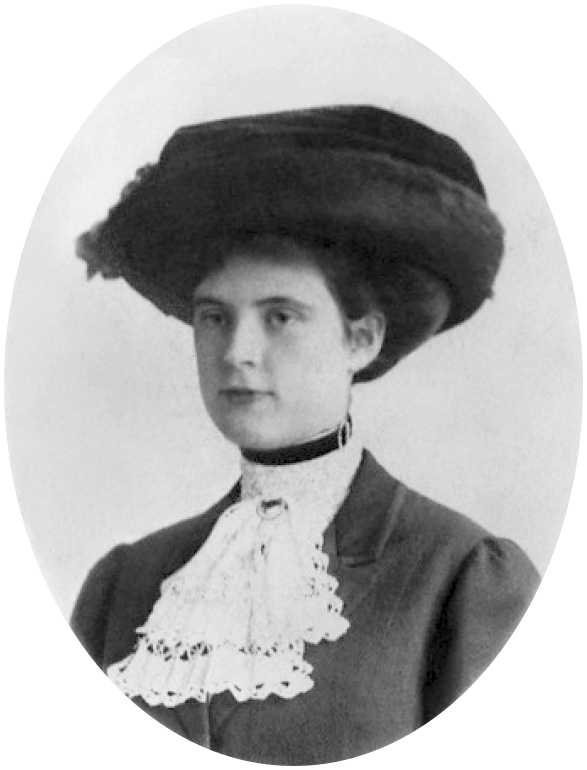
Lucy Mercer

- A Lisunov Li-2 airliner, operated by Tarom crashed in the Lotriora Valley in Romania, near the city of Sibiu, killing all 24 people on board. The Romanian media did not immediately publish reports about the aviation accident, and the first news reports were provided by the Austrian Embassy in Bucharest, because a married couple from Austria had died in the crash. The only other information had been that the plane had been on a flight to Bucharest from the city of Cluj.
- The Beatles held a press conference in Chicago, during which John Lennon apologized for his "more popular than Jesus" remark made in a magazine interview in March, saying, "I'm sorry, I'm sorry I said it really. I didn't mean it as a lousy, anti-religious thing. I was sort of deploring the attitude toward Christianity. I wasn't saying the Beatles are better than God or Jesus."
- Former White House Press Secretary Jonathan Daniels, an editor for the daily newspaper News and Observer in Raleigh, North Carolina, announced that his upcoming book, The Time Between the Wars, would reveal the secret romance between U.S. President Franklin D. Roosevelt and Lucy Mercer.
- Born: Juan María Solare, Argentine composer; in Buenos Aires

== August 12, 1966 (Friday) ==
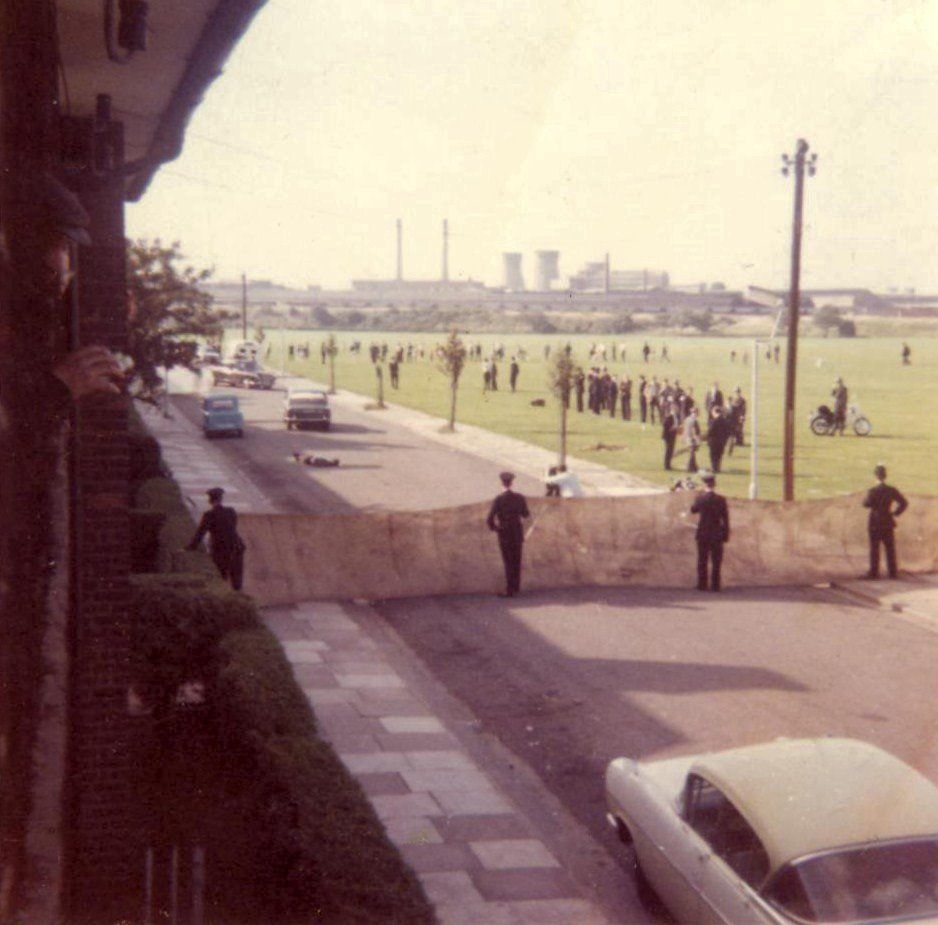
August 12, 1966: Crime scene of the "Massacre of Braybrook Street"

- The "Massacre of Braybrook Street" took place in London when three gunmen— Harry Roberts, John Duddy and Jack Witney shot and killed three plainclothes policemen in London. The officers— Detective Sergeant Christopher Head, Detective Constable David Wombwell, and Constable Geoffrey Fox— were unarmed and had been on patrol and had stopped to question the three assailants. Only 24 British policemen had been murdered in the line of duty in the preceding 55 years, and the last time that multiple policemen had been killed had been in December, 1910. Witney was the first to be arrested, on August 15, as the police search was assisted by tips from the public, including "tips from the criminal world, apparently itself appalled by the shootings". Duddy was arrested in Glasgow on August 17. Harry Roberts would not be apprehended until November 15, after having been spotted in a forest near the town of Bishop's Stortford in Hertfordshire. Duddy would die in prison in 1981; Witney would be released in 1991 but would be murdered by his roommate, in his home, in 1999. Four days short of having been incarcerated for 48 years, Roberts would be paroled on November 11, 2014, at the age of 78.
- China's Defense Minister Lin Biao was elected as First Vice Chairman of the Chinese Communist Party, second only to Chairman Mao Zedong. Originally designated to be the future leader of China, Lin would be killed on September 13, 1971, after a rift between him and Mao.
- Died:
  - J. H. Conradie, 69, who had been the Speaker of the National Assembly of South Africa from 1951 to 1960
  - Mike McTigue, 73, Irish boxer who had held the world light heavyweight championship from 1923 to 1925

== August 13, 1966 (Saturday) ==
- A fire at a Salvation Army hostel for retired men on fixed incomes killed 29 residents in Melbourne, Australia. The William Booth Memorial Home, located on Little Lonsdale Street, caught fire at about 8:30 p.m., and engulfed the building within 15 minutes. Most died in their rooms of asphyxiation. The origin of the blaze was eventually traced to a 61-year-old man on the third floor, who had accidentally overturned an electric heater while warming himself.
- In the People's Republic of China, at the close of a week-long session of the Communist Party Central Committee, Chairman Mao Zedong announced the beginning of a purge of party officials as part of the Cultural Revolution.
- Three days of meetings of NASA's Manned Space Flight Management Council began at Lake Logan, North Carolina, as NASA Headquarters and representatives of the MSC and MSFC came to an agreement on their roles in the development and operations of future human spaceflight hardware, specifically an orbiting American space station as an intermediate step between early Apollo missions and later, more complex, uncrewed and crewed planetary missions.

== August 14, 1966 (Sunday) ==
- At 8:43 a.m., Eastern time, Lunar Orbiter 1 became the first U.S. spacecraft to orbit a heavenly body other than the Earth, successfully entering its orbit around the Moon.
- Born:
  - Freddy Rincon, Colombian footballer with 84 caps for the Colombia national team as a midefielder; in Buenaventura (killed in traffic accident, 2022)
  - Halle Berry, African-American actress; in Cleveland, Ohio
- Died: Frederick W. "Duke" Slater, 67, the last African-American NFL player (primarily for the Chicago Cardinals) before the league imposed its unwritten color ban, and one of the first black stars for a white college football team (at the University of Iowa). In 1960, Slater became the first black judge in Chicago when he was elected as a Superior Court Judge for Cook County.

== August 15, 1966 (Monday) ==
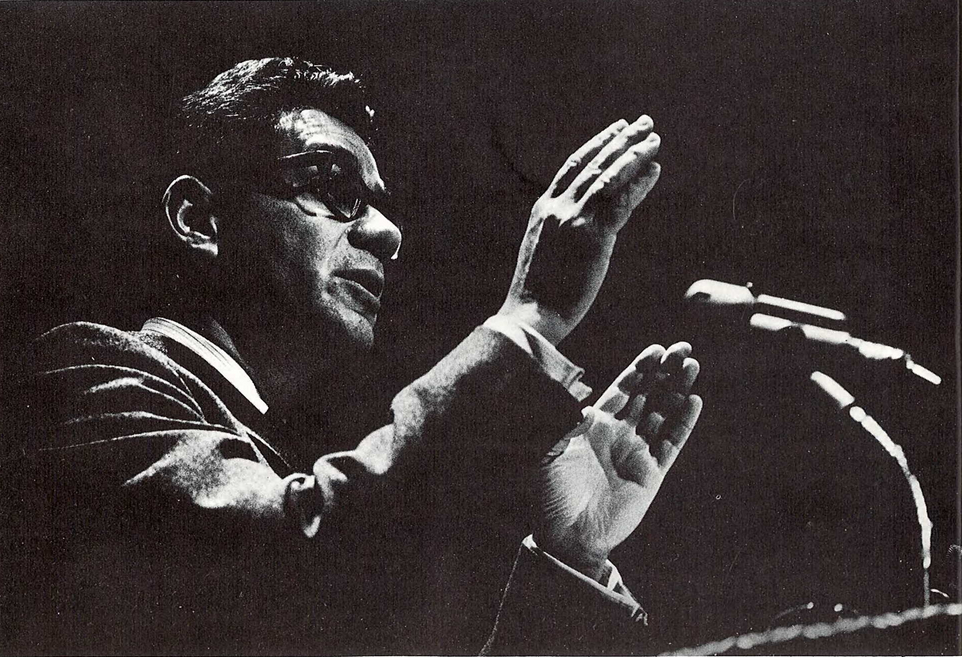
Mark Lane

- The first mass-marketed "JFK conspiracy" book to question the conclusions of the Warren Commission regarding the assassination of John F. Kennedy, Rush to Judgment, was published. Authored by lawyer Mark Lane, and subtitled "A Critique of the Warren Commission's Inquiry into the Murders of President John F. Kennedy, Officer J. D. Tippit and Lee Harvey Oswald", it was "the third book in recent months" to question the commission's conclusions, but the first to become a bestseller.
- Syrian MiG-17 jets strafed an Israeli patrol boat that had accidentally run aground on a shoal 80 metres (260 ft) from the Syrian side of the Sea of Galilee. Anti-aircraft guns on the boat downed one of the MiGs into the lake. Almost immediately, a pair of Mirage aircraft were dispatched by the Israeli Air Force and ordered to make "unrestricted pursuit" of the Syrian jets, downing another MiG-21, and bombing of the Syrian shore by Vantour aircraft followed, but hit the Syrian village of Massadia. After a 12-day standoff, the Israeli Navy was able to retrieve the patrol boat, and the Syrians recovered the remains of the MiG-21 and its pilot.
- John Hay Whitney announced the closure of the New York Herald Tribune, four months after its last edition had appeared.
- Born: Scott Brosius, American baseball star, and 1998 World Series MVP for the New York Yankees; in Hillsboro, Oregon
- Died:
  - George Burns, 76, American baseball star, two-time National League stolen base leader in 1914 and 1919 and player for the New York Giants in the 1921 World Series."George Burns, 75, Dead; Ex-Giant", Daily News (New York), August 16, 1966, p.
  - Jan Kiepura, 64, Polish professional opera singer and film star, died of a heart attack while in Harrison, New York.

== August 16, 1966 (Tuesday) ==
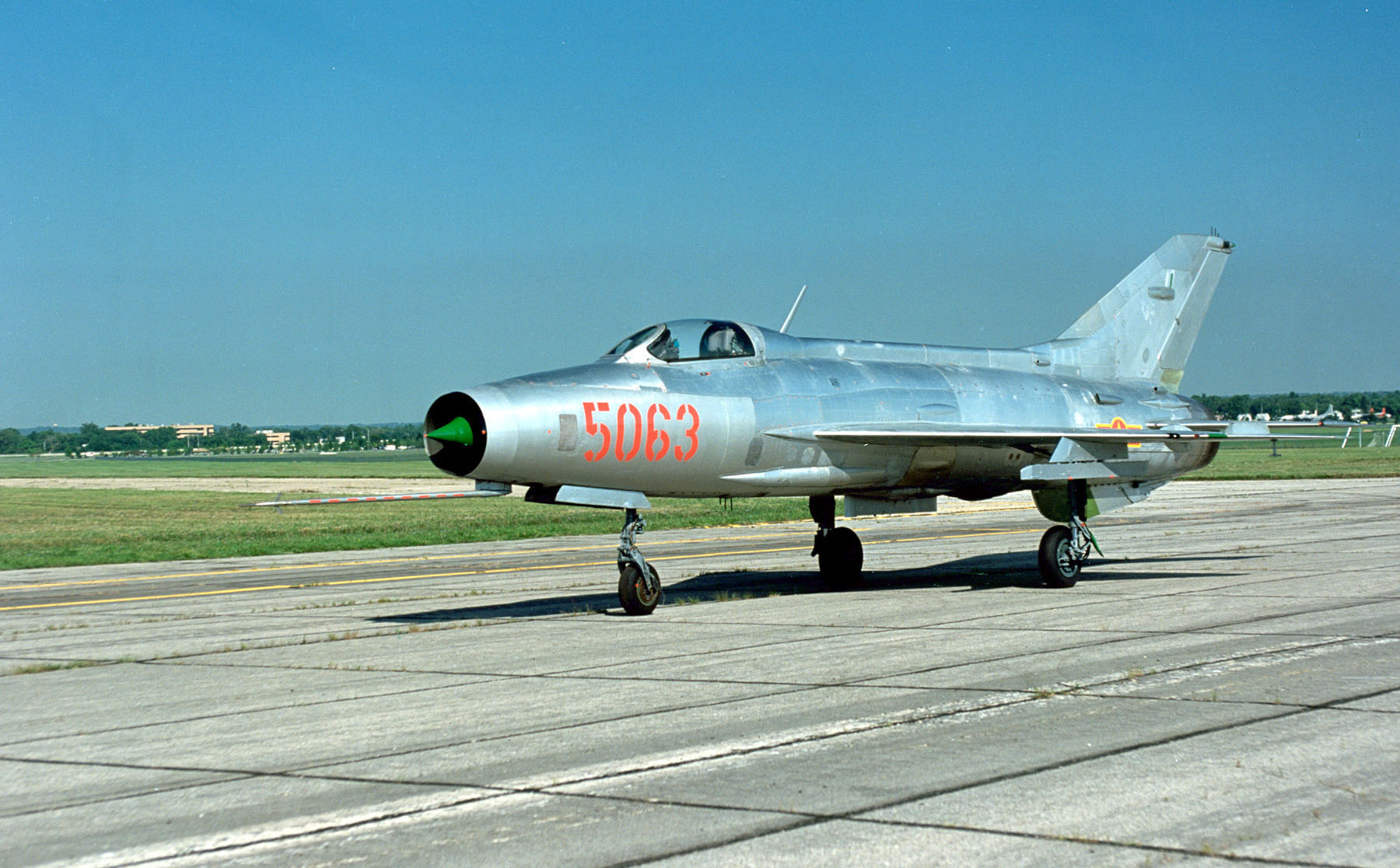
A MiG-21 fighter

- A fully intact Soviet MiG-21 supersonic jet fighter, the newest aircraft in the Soviet arsenal, was put in Western hands for the first time, after an Iraq Air Force pilot defected to Israel. The pilot, later identified as Captain Munir Redfa of ethnic Assyrian descent, said that he had been discriminated against for being an Iraqi Christian in the predominantly Muslim nation, and that he had landed in Israel because it was the closest nearby nation that would not return him to Iraq for punishment. Israeli experts studied the MiG-21 thoroughly, gaining knowledge that would be useful in the Six-Day War ten months later, then turned it over to the United States for a month, before returning it to Iraq.
- The House Un-American Activities Committee began an investigation of Americans who had demonstrated against the Vietnam War, seeking "evidence that communist organizations were instigating their operations". Twelve demonstrators issued subpoenas to testify on activities such as urging donations to the Viet Cong. Eight people in attendance were forcibly removed from the hearing and arrested after they began shouting protests, while nine others were arrested outside the Capitol building for disturbing the peace. U.S. District Judge Howard F. Corcoran had issued an injunction the day before, prohibiting the hearings from going forward, but a Court of Appeals order had reversed the injunction and the hearings took place as scheduled.
- In the capital of Colombia, the Presidents of Colombia, Chile and Venezuela, along with personal representatives from the Presidents of Ecuador and Peru, signed the "Declaration of Bogotá", pledging to coordinate a joint economic policy. Within three years, Bolivia would join the original five nations to form the Andean Pact (Pacto Andino), now referred to as the Andean Community.

== August 17, 1966 (Wednesday) ==
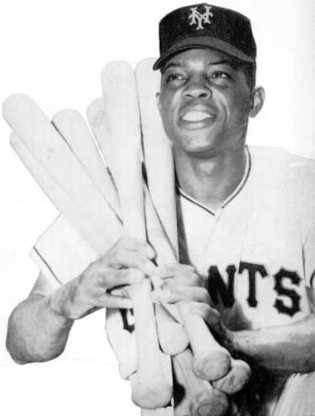
Mays 535 runs

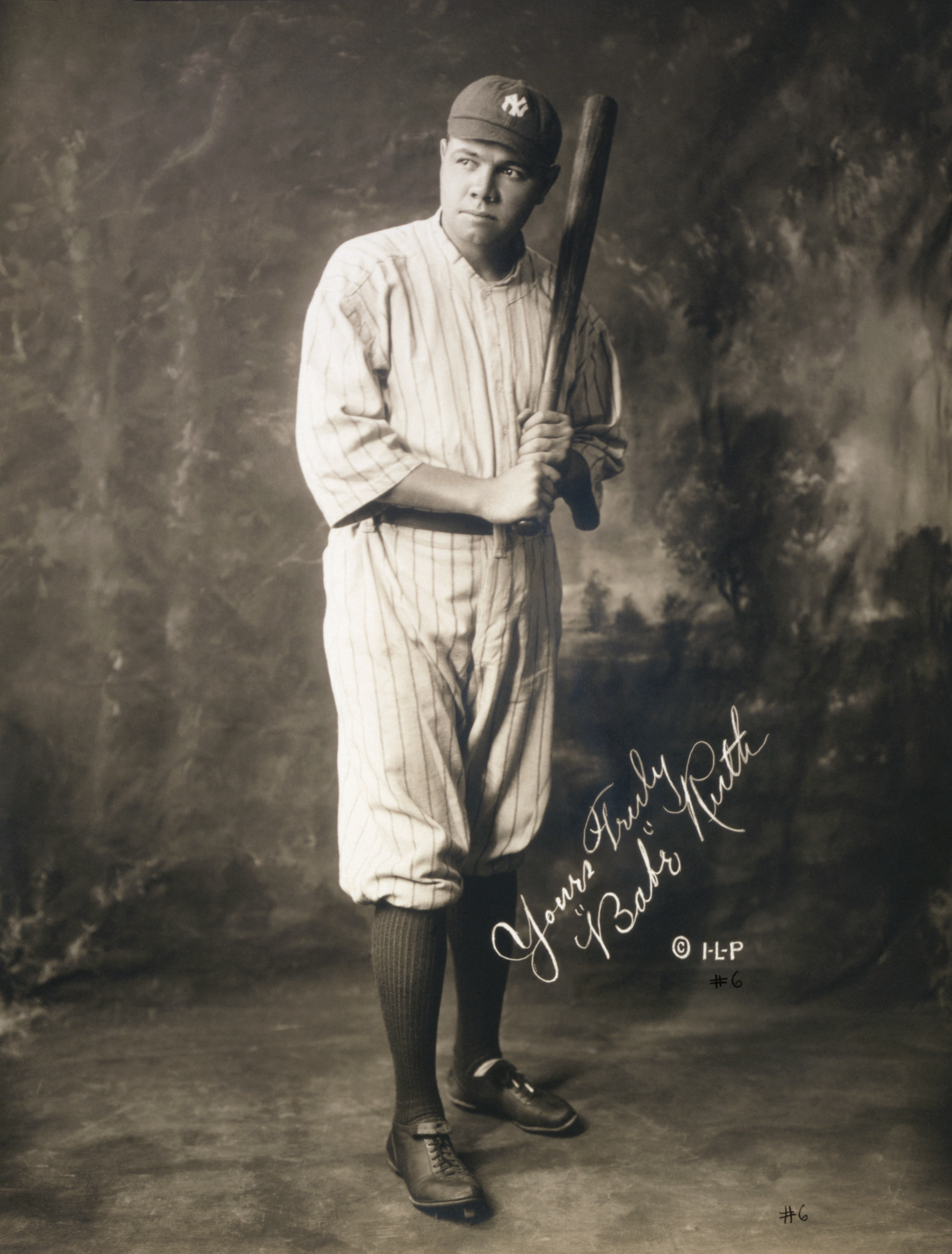
Ruth 714 runs

- Willie Mays hit his 535th home run, placing him in second place in the record for career home runs. At the time, only Babe Ruth, who had hit 714 home runs, was higher. Hank Aaron, who would later surpass Mays and Ruth, had 431 home runs at this time. Mays would retire at the end of the 1973 season with 660 homers.
- The United States launched the Pioneer 7 space probe, placing it into an orbit around the Sun at an average distance of 83,000,000 miles (134,000,000 km) for the purpose of making solar radiation and magnetic field measurements. Nearly 20 years later, on March 20, 1986, it would become the first Earth probe to gather data about Halley's Comet. Contact with the probe would last for 29 years, until March 1995.
- Born:
  - Rodney Mullen, American professional skateboarder and extreme sports champion credited with inventing numerous skateboarding techniques, including the kickflip and the flatground ollie; in Gainesville, Florida
  - Matt Maiellaro, American filmmaker, musician and voice actor; in Pensacola, Florida
- Died: Bill Allington, 62, baseball manager who coached the Rockford Peaches to four All-American Girls Professional Baseball League championships.

== August 18, 1966 (Thursday) ==
- A crowd of nearly one million Chinese college and high school students, pledging themselves to the Red Guards movement, rallied at Tienanmen Square in Beijing, and Chairman Mao, who told aides that the youth of China should have as many opportunities as possible to see their revolutionary leader, appeared in person. Dressed in the simple Red Army soldier's uniform that would soon be adopted by his followers, and welcoming senior leader Song Binbin as she fastened a Red Guards armband on his sleeve, Mao told the group, "Rebel! Without rebellion nothing bad can be fixed." The exhortation to fight the Four Olds (old customs, old culture, old habits and old ideas) would be taken to heart by millions nationwide, and a wave of violence would follow. "In this bloody drama," it would be written later, "the main role was not played by university students, but by juveniles, middle school and even primary school kids who were delirious from the atmosphere of total permissiveness."
- In the battle of Long Tan, described by one author as "the most dramatic and important event" of Australia's seven-year campaign in the Vietnam War, the 108 men of D Company of the 6th Battalion, Royal Australian Regiment, met and defeated a Viet Cong force estimated to be four times larger, in the Phuoc Tuy Province of South Vietnam.
- Born: Yevgeny Zinichev, Russian politician and former Emergency Situation Minister of Russia; in Leningrad, Russian SFSR, Soviet Union (now Saint Petersburg, Russia) (d.2021)

== August 19, 1966 (Friday) ==
- An earthquake centered at Varto, Turkey, along with subsequent aftershocks, killed 2,394 people and injured more than 10,000. The quakes destroyed eight villages in the Muş Province in eastern Turkey (including Varto) and 29 villages in the Erzurum Province, and caused heavy damage in the cities of Muş and Erzurum. Ten days afterward, a reporter noted that none of the houses in the 785-person village of Sıra Söğütler remained standing, and that more than a fifth of the residents (160) had been killed. The 6.7 magnitude tremor struck at 3:22 p.m. local time (1222 UTC) and lasted for about 20 seconds.
- In fiction, August 19, 1966, is the date of a nuclear war in the 1960 film The Time Machine, an adaptation of the 1895 novel of the same name by H. G. Wells. Remaining in London, the film's hero (played by Rod Taylor) departs from December 31, 1899, witnessing future wars as he stops at September 13, 1917, then June 19, 1940, until getting buried in lava in 1966. Trapped, he has to move forward 800 millennia to October 12 in the year 802,701 before the stone has eroded.
- The strike by 35,300 members of the International Association of Machinists against five major U.S. airlines (United, Northwest, TWA, Eastern and National), came to an end after more than six weeks, as IAM members voted 17,727 to 8,235 to approve a new contract. Members began returning to work that evening, and the airline operations, which accounted for two-thirds of flights, resumed the following day.
- NASA announced selection of McDonnell to manufacture an airlock module (AM) for AAP to permit astronauts to enter the empty hydrogen tank of a spent S-IVB Saturn stage. The AM would form an interstage between the spent rocket stage and the Apollo CSM and would contain environmental and life support systems to make the structure habitable in space.
- Born: Lee Ann Womack, American country music singer known for I Hope You Dance, winner of six Country Music Association Awards and one Grammy Award.; in Jacksonville, Texas
- Died: Fritz Bleyl, 85, German Expressionist artist and architect

== August 20, 1966 (Saturday) ==
- The 1966–67 Bundesliga season began in Germany, and rookie goalkeeper Sepp Maier played the first of 442 consecutive games for Bayern Munich. His final game would be on June 9, 1979, at the end of the 1978–79 season, and Maier— who had never been kept out of a game field because of an injury, suspension or poor play— would be badly hurt in a car wreck a month before the 1979–80 season.
- The 1966 European Aquatics Championships opened in Utrecht in the Netherlands.
- Born:
  - Dimebag Darrell (stage name for Darrell Abbot, American heavy metal guitarist who was murdered during a performance; in Ennis, Texas (d. 2004)
  - Enrico Letta, Prime Minister of Italy from 2013 and 2014; in Pisa
- Died: Victor Proetz, 69, American architect and author

== August 21, 1966 (Sunday) ==
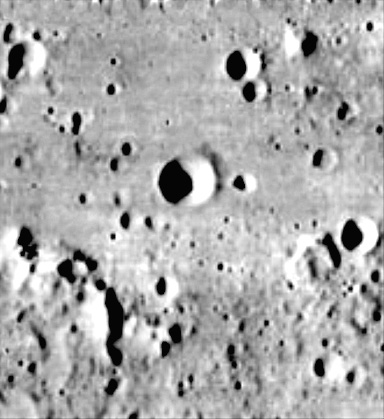
The Benedict crater as seen by the Lunar Orbiter

- Following up on the first low resolution pictures taken by the Soviet space probe Luna 3 on October 26, 1959, the U.S. Lunar Orbiter 1 spacecraft transmitted the first high resolution photograph of the far side of the Moon back to Earth. An Associated Press report to American newspapers referred to the picture, taken from an altitude of 1,000 miles (1,600 km), as "History's first good photograph of the back side of the moon". The Luna 3 photos had been taken from a distance of 40,000 miles (64,000 km) on a flyby. The Soviet Union's Luna 10, which in April had become the first probe ever to orbit the Moon, carried measuring instruments but did not take photographs.
- Islamic activist Sayyid Qutb, leader of the Muslim Brotherhood in Egypt, arrested a year earlier for conspiracy to assassinate President Gamal Abdel Nasser, was sentenced to death after a four-month-long trial by a military tribunal. He and two associates ('Abd al-Fattah Isma'il and Yusuf al-Hawwash) were convicted, and hanged on August 29, while four others had their death sentences commuted on August 31 to terms ranging from 10 to 15 years in prison. One author would note later that "His martyrdom was thus assured. Instead of halting the dissemination of Qutb's ideas, it guaranteed it."
- Died: Jack Bisset, 65, player coach who guided the South Melbourne Swans to the championship of the Victorian Football League, forerunner of the Australian Football League.

== August 22, 1966 (Monday) ==
- On their third day of demonstrations in Beijing, China's "Red Guards", mostly teenagers, began putting up posters with an ultimatum advising people to give up "bourgeois" fashions and habits, including Western styles of clothing (referred to as "Hong Kong style clothes"), hairstyles, and habits, such as using a taxi cab, getting a manicure or a massage, or ordering an expensive meal in a restaurant. Neon signs were torn down by the Guards, and storekeepers were warned to remove foreign goods from sale. The ultimatum advised that people would have one week to purge themselves of alien influence and added that "If you neglect this, we will not be friendly and we will take action."
- The National Farm Workers Association (NFWA), led by Cesar Chavez from mostly Hispanic American workers, and the Agricultural Workers Organizing Committee (AWOC), governed by Larry Itliong and with mostly Filipino-American members, merged to create the United Farm Workers Organizing Committee (UFWOC). The UFWOC would later become the United Farm Workers of America (UFW).
- American cartoonist Charles M. Schulz introduced the character of Peppermint Patty in his comic strip, Peanuts. In the January 15, 1972, strip, her full name would be revealed as "Patricia Reichardt".
- Best Buy, the discount U.S. consumer electronics retailer, opened its first store, initially with the trade name Sound of Music, with a location at St. Paul, Minnesota.
- Born: GZA (stage name for Gary Grice), American rapper and founding member of Wu-Tang Clan; in Brooklyn

== August 23, 1966 (Tuesday) ==
- The American merchant vessel SS Baton Rouge Victory was sunk in Saigon by a Vietcong mine. Seven civilian crew members were killed.
- Born: Rik Smits, nicknamed "The Dunking Dutchman", Netherlands-born NBA star; in Eindhoven
- Died: Francis X. Bushman, 83, American silent film star, director and screenwriter

== August 24, 1966 (Wednesday) ==
- The Soviet Union launched the Luna 11 space probe, preparing to send its own photographs of the Moon taken from lunar orbit. After the probe arrived, however, unidentified debris lodged in one of its attitude control engines, and the camera could not be aimed at the lunar surface. Instead, the probe transmitted images of the blackness of outer space.
- Tom Stoppard's tragicomedy Rosencrantz and Guildenstern Are Dead was given its very first performance, with a première at the Edinburgh Festival Fringe, before versions premiered in 1967 in London at the Royal National Theatre and in New York on Broadway at the Alvin Theatre.
- The Doors, with Jim Morrison as the lead singer, began recording their debut LP of the same name, with a release on January 4, 1967. The song Light My Fire would reach number one as a single release.
- Died:
  - Lao She, 67, Chinese novelist, committed suicide after being tortured by members of the Red Guards, who had declared him to be a "counterrevolutionary" because he had collected works of art.
  - Li Da, 75, Chinese Marxist philosopher who had been expelled from the Chinese Communist Party on June 1, died from complications of diabetes after having been denied medication.

== August 25, 1966 (Thursday) ==
- Riots broke out in Djibouti, the capital of the colony of French Somaliland, as France's President Charles de Gaulle arrived for a visit to his nation's last African colonial outpost. French Foreign Legion troops and government police clashed with protesters who were seeking independence from France. On September 25, France would announce a referendum on independence, which would take place on March 19, 1967. Internal self-government would be permitted with the colony renamed the French Territory of the Afars and the Issas, and after a second referendum ten years later, the Republic of Djibouti would become independent on June 27, 1977.
- The Red Guards began the transformation of Lhasa, the capital of Tibet, formerly a Buddhist kingdom and now a Chinese autonomous region. Ancient relics were shipped away from the monasteries or destroyed, and shrines were vandalized. Within a month, the streets were renamed, lamas were forced to confess their crimes against the Revolution, posters of Chairman Mao were required in all homes, and the Tibetan people were required to study Quotations from Chairman Mao Tse-tung, the "Little Red Book" that was distributed nationwide.
- The U.S. House of Representatives overwhelmingly rejected a request by President Johnson for authority to activate the 133,000 military reserve forces (including the Army National Guard and the Air National Guard) for duty in the Vietnam War. Although the U.S. Senate had approved the plan, the first vote in the House was 162–39 against, and when a roll call was requested, the measure failed 378 to 3.
- Born:
  - Terminator X (stage name for Norman Rogers), American DJ and former member of Public Enemy; in Long Island
  - Agostino Abbagnale, Italian rower and three-time Olympic gold medalist (1988, 1996 and 2000); in Pompeii
  - Antonie Kamerling, Dutch television and film actor; in Arnhem (committed suicide, 2010)
  - Robert Maschio, American television actor (Scrubs); in New York City
  - Michael Cohen, American attorney; in Lawrence, Nassau County, New York
- Died: Lance Comfort, 58, British film and TV director and producer

== August 26, 1966 (Friday) ==
- The first battle in the Namibian War of Independence took place at Ongulumbashe (Omugulugombashe), in the northern section of South West Africa, in an attack against the People's Liberation Army of Namibia (PLAN), the armed wing of the South West Africa People's Organization (SWAPO). A 39-man group from the South African Police, assisted by the South African Defence Force, eight helicopter pilots from the South African Air Force, and a black South African informant, commenced Operation Blue Wildebeest. The War of Independence (part of the larger South African Border War, which included fighting with soldiers from Angola) would continue until 1989. August 26 is now celebrated as "Heroes Day".
- NASA released the first photograph of the Earth as seen from the Moon, after Lunar Orbiter 1 transmitted a picture taken three days earlier. Ground control had decided to turn the orbiter's camera toward the Earth, just as the probe was about to travel toward the far side, in order to show both objects in the same photo. At the time, the Moon was between its perigee (August 17) and apogee (August 31) in relation to Earth, and the "first self-portrait of the Earth" was taken at a distance of roughly 239,000 miles (385,000 km).
- As the Cultural Revolution campaign against foreign influence continued, the Red Guards placed posters in Beijing demanding that all foreigners and people of bourgeois background leave by the end of the day.
- Born:
  - Shirley Manson, Scottish singer and songwriter of the band Garbage; in Edinburgh
  - Jacques Brinkman, Dutch Olympic champion field hockey player; in Utrecht
- Died: Edmund Blampied, 80, British artist and illustrator from Jersey in the Channel Islands

== August 27, 1966 (Saturday) ==
- Days away from turning 65, British yachtsman Francis Chichester set off from the Plymouth harbor in his ketch, the Gipsy Moth IV, with a goal of becoming the first person to sail around the world by himself. Chichester hoped to reach Australia within 100 days, and would reach Sydney on December 12, exhausted and seven days later than planned. After six weeks' rest, he would set off for the United Kingdom, and return to a hero's welcome at Plymouth on May 28, 1967, having traveled 29,617 miles (47,664 km).
- The 4.1-mile (6.6 km) long Astoria–Megler Bridge, at the time the longest continuous truss bridge in the world, opened over the Columbia River, linking Astoria, Oregon and Megler, Washington.
- Born: Juhan Parts, 15th Prime Minister of Estonia from 2003 to 2005; in Tallinn

== August 28, 1966 (Sunday) ==
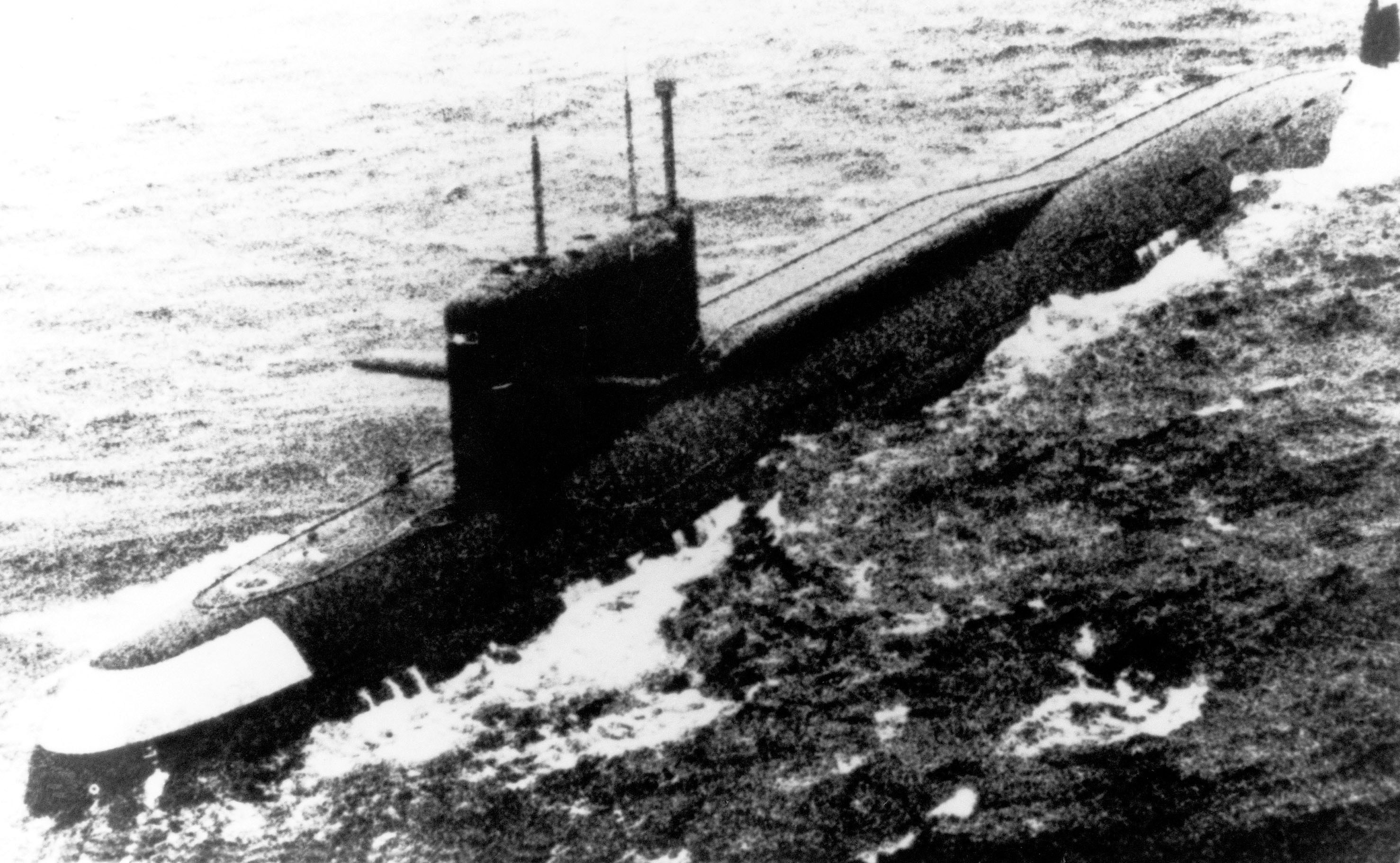
Yankee I-class sub

- The first of 34 Soviet nuclear missile submarines that were designated in the west as "Yankee-class", and in the Soviet Union as Project 667A or Navaga (a species of codfish) was launched by the Soviet Navy.
- The science of theoretical biology had its first seminar when the Rockefeller Foundation hosted a gathering of computer scientists, mathematicians, physicists and biologists (but, surprisingly, "hardly any molecular biologists") at the Villa Serbelloni overlooking Lake Como, in Bellagio, Italy.
- The Soviet Union announced that it was training North Vietnamese Air Force pilots.
- Died: Rudolf Herrnstadt, 63, East German newspaper publisher who had passed Nazi Germany secrets to the Soviets during World War II.

== August 29, 1966 (Monday) ==
- The Beatles played their final official concert, "marking the end of a career as international performing artists that lasted just under three years". A crowd of 25,000 turned out at Candlestick Park in San Francisco, paying between $3.80 and $7.00 to see the Fab Four. On their final concert tour, the group played in 14 cities over 18 days in August, in Chicago, Detroit, Cleveland, Washington, Philadelphia, Toronto, Boston, Memphis, Cincinnati, St. Louis, New York, Los Angeles, Seattle, and San Francisco. Afterwards, the group played only in the studio, with the exception of their unscheduled "rooftop concert" on the building housing Apple Records, on January 30, 1969.
- NASA Deputy Administrator Robert C. Seamans Jr., notified George E. Mueller of approval to proceed with development and procurement actions to conduct one AAP Apollo Telescope Mount (ATM) flight on missions 211/212 (as an alternate to the basic Apollo mission assigned to those two vehicles). Since only one ATM flight was thus far approved, Seamans emphasized the importance of focusing all project effort on meeting the existing SA 211/212 schedule.
- Born: Stephen Trask, American musician and composer; as Stephen Schwartz
- Died:
  - Nick Piantanida, 34, American balloonist, died after nearly four months in a coma.
  - Sayyid Qutb, 59, Egyptian Muslim Brotherhood leader, was hanged in prison in Cairo after being convicted of conspiracy to assassinate President Gamal Abdel Nasser.
  - Melvin B. Tolson, 68, American poet

== August 30, 1966 (Tuesday) ==
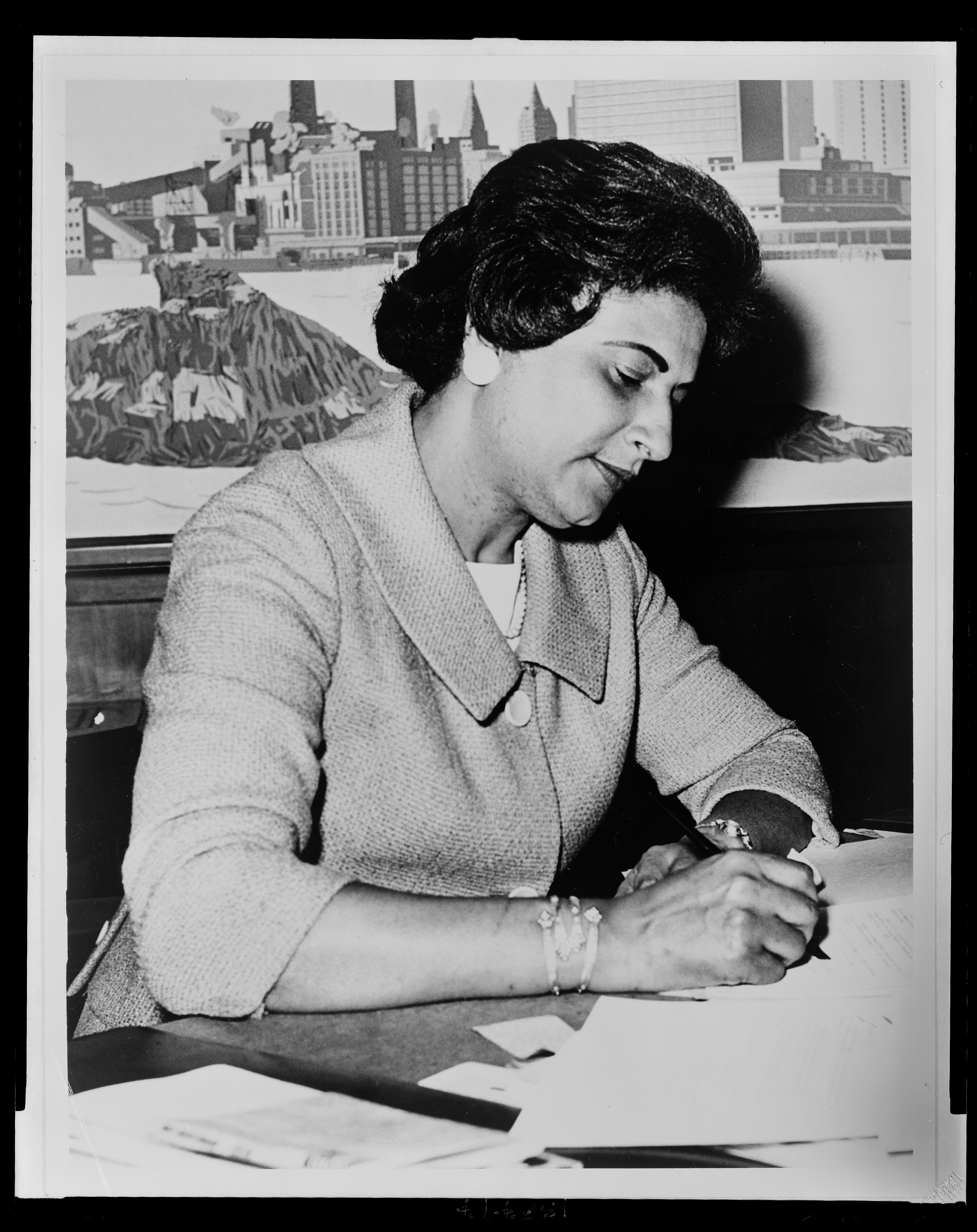
Judge Motley

- The United States Senate, by voice vote, approved the confirmation of Constance Baker Motley of New York City as a U.S. District Judge, making her the first African-American woman to ever be named to the federal bench. In 1965, President Johnson had nominated her to fill a vacancy in the U.S. Court of Appeals for the Second Circuit, but withdrew the nomination because of intense opposition. When he nominated her for the federal district court position, there was still resistance from U.S. senators from the Deep South, particularly Senator James Eastland of Mississippi, who attempted to show, unsuccessfully, that she had been a former Communist. She would serve until her death in 2005.

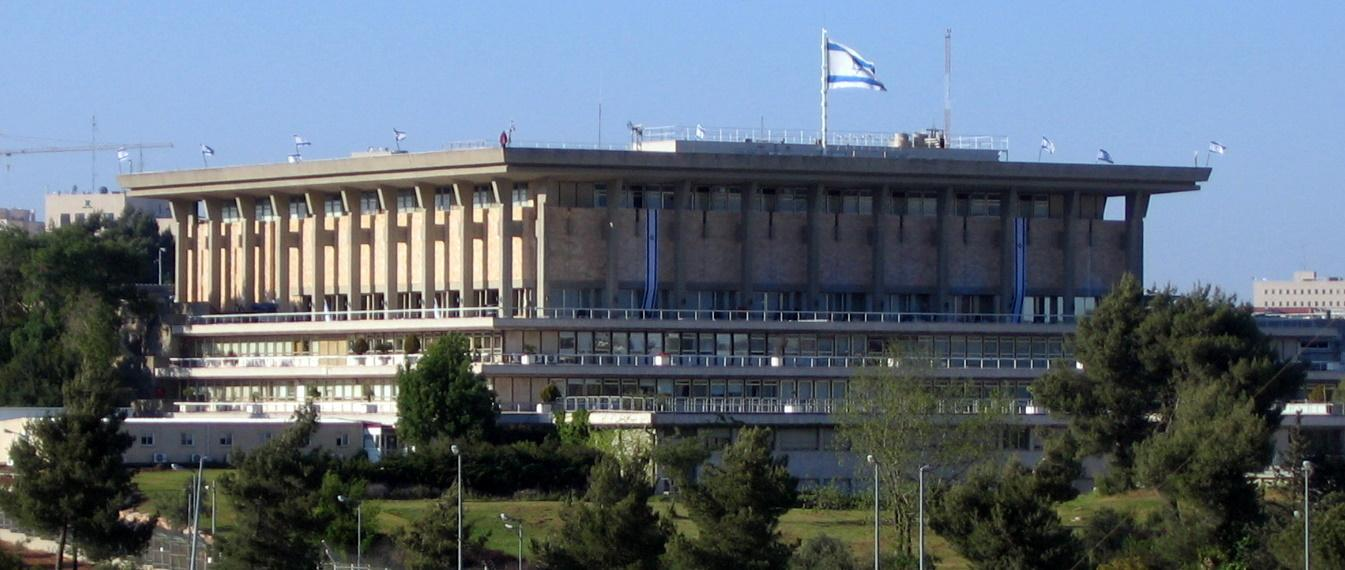
The Knesset building

- The Knesset Building, the sixth and final home of the Parliament of Israel, was dedicated at Givat Ram in Jerusalem, seven years after the death of a philanthropist Baron James de Rothschild, who had left a sizable amount of money in his will for the building's construction. Prime Minister David Ben-Gurion presided over a ceremony attended by the speakers of parliaments from 41 different nations, opened by the lighting of a huge beacon sitting inside a metal sculpture depicting the burning bush referred to in the Book of Exodus, after which beacons at 40 locations across Israel were lit.
- The mid-air collision of an LAPD police helicopter and a radio station's traffic reporting helicopter, over Dodger Stadium in Los Angeles, killed the five people on both aircraft. At 5:50 in the afternoon, popular radio station KMPC reporter Max Schumacher had been doing updates for the station's "Airwatch" traffic report segment and was flying southbound in his Bell J-2 craft with two guests, Buck Newcomb and wife Lorraine Newcomb, to investigate a report of a shooting downtown. At the same time, Los Angeles Police Department pilot Alex Ilnicki and his observer, L. D. Amberg, were northbound in the LAPD's Bell C-4 copter to observe traffic on the Pasadena Freeway. Both aircraft were at an altitude of 500 feet (150 m) when the accident happened.

== August 31, 1966 (Wednesday) ==
- The Daxing Massacre, three days of murder in the Daxing District of Beijing, peaked with the deaths of several hundred people in a single day, including 110 in the Daxinzhuang Commune, and another 56 people from various families. With the sanction of the government, the Red Guards killed 324 people from 171 families (including the elderly and infants), before a garrison of Beijing police finally intervened to halt the killings. At the same time, killing of families was in its fifth day in the Changping District, where 327 people would be slaughtered over ten days.
