= Suderman =

Suderman is a surname. Notable people with the surname include:

- Dick Suderman (1939–1972), Canadian Football League player
- Spencer Suderman (born 1966), American airshow performer

== See also ==
- Sudermann
