= Jacob H. Horwitz =

American businessman and philanthropist and a fashion innovator

- Born: 1 January 1892; London, England
- Died: 11 October 1992 (aged 100); Lawrence, Nassau County, New York, United States
- Other name: Jack Horwitz
- Occupations: Businessman in the fashion industry, philanthropist.
- Awards: Coty Award, 1947.

Jacob H. Horwitz (1 January 1892 – 11 October 1992), known as Jack, was an American businessman and philanthropist and a fashion innovator whose company, Horwitz and Duberman (founded 1925), was one of the first to specialise in junior miss and teenage clothing.

== Early life ==
Horwitz was born 1 January 1892, in London. His family migrated to America while he was a child, with the assistance of the Hebrew Immigrant Aid Society. He went to school in Connecticut, graduating in 1910. Rather than study engineering at Yale University, the young Horwitz and a friend decided to launch a grocer's in Manhattan. As a member of the National Guard of the United States Horwitz was called into service under John J. Pershing to participate in the Pancho Villa Expedition. When he returned, he found the grocery business had been bankrupted. Horwitz then served in World War I in France as a sergeant, and as a cavalryman in Argonne.

== Fashion ==
Horwitz formed the Horwitz & Duberman company in 1925. His partner, Duberman, was a Ukrainian Russian Jew who had emigrated from Hamburg in April 1913 after deserting from the Russian Army, and became a naturalised citizen in 1920. Horwitz & Duberman originally produced shirtwaists, which Horwitz added skirts to in order to create dresses. In 1987 Horwitz recalled that when young women and teenagers had to buy clothing, they were forced to buy adult size clothing and then alter it to make it fit. At that time, the "junior miss" market was largely overlooked, and by offering clothing under the "Judy and Jill Fashions" label specifically for teenagers and young women, Horwitz's business proved successful. In 1939 the company offered dresses branded with the name of the popular actress and singer Deanna Durbin, who was in her late teens at the time, and a Junior Miss size.

Horwitz was awarded the Coty Award in 1947 alongside Nettie Rosenstein, Adele Simpson, and Mark Mooring, the made-to-order designer for Bergdorf Goodman. That year, the awards were selected to reflect the best examples of each of the industry's four main branches, with Horwitz chosen to represent junior fashion. Horwitz said in 1987 that he received the award as much for his encouragement and support of his young employees as for his own work, particularly as he was conscious to hire young women whom he would teach design and sales skills. Although Horwitz designed clothing, he saw himself as "more of a stylist than a designer," and worked closely with his young employees, choosing what to make up from their design drawings. In March 1953 LIFE ran an article showing a weekend capsule wardrobe designed by Betse Cann for Horwitz & Duberman, offering six crushproof outfits which could be fitted, along with underwear and accessories, into a single handbag.

In the early 1950s Horwitz bought out Duberman, and the company became Jack Horwitz Associates. He had retired from his business by 1960, but went on to assist a friend who worked in the coat-making business before retiring finally in 1970.

== Philanthropy ==
As a philanthropist Horwitz was particularly remembered for his role in founding the Long Island Jewish Medical Center in 1949, on whose board of directors he sat for over forty years. At the age of 94 he was still actively attending the center's board and committee meetings. He was also involved in the founding of the Metropolitan Museum of Art's Costume Institute, and fundraising for the Institute. He also supported and served as an officer for the Fashion Institute of Technology and the American Legion alongside Jewish organisations such as the HIAS (who had assisted him and his family to come to the United States), the Federation of Jewish Philanthropies, the Five Towns Young Men's and Young Women's Hebrew Association, and the Temple Israel synagogue in Lawrence, Long Island.

== Later life and death ==
Horwitz was married to Rose Greenberger for 59 years until her death in 1986. He died at home in Lawrence, Nassau County, New York, aged 100, on 11 October 1992 of congestive heart failure.
