= Sudermann =

Sudermann is a surname. Notable people with the surname include:

- Heinrich Sudermann (1520–1591), German jurist and Hanseatic League official
- Hermann Sudermann (1857–1928), German dramatist and novelist

== See also ==
- Suderman
