= Mark Mooring =

American costume designer (1901–1971)

Mark Mooring (1901–1971) was an American fashion and costume designer.

Mark Mooring, 1947

He grew up in Texas and graduated from Parsons School of Design, New York, in 1923. After this, he designed costumes for Broadway theatre productions including Song of the Flames (1925) and Dearest Enemy (1926).

Between 1933 and 1948, Mooring was a designer for the custom department of Bergdorf Goodman. While there he worked alongside Leslie Morris and Mary Gleason, and the three of them became known as a strong design team and the store's best known designers. For his work at Bergdorf's, Mooring was awarded a Coty Award in 1947 alongside Jacob H. Horwitz, Nettie Rosenstein and Adele Simpson. The awards that year were awarded to representatives of the four main branches of the American fashion industry, with Mooring representing bespoke high-end design while the others represented high end wholesale (Rosenstein), mid-priced wholesale (Simpson) and junior fashion (Horwitz). Women dressed by Mooring included Ina Claire and Margaret Leighton. After working for Elizabeth Arden and other Seventh Avenue establishments, he would return to Bergdorf's in 1960.

In 1962 Mooring moved to Hollywood, where he worked with a designer called Marusia until his death, aged 71, on January 5, 1971, following a stroke.

Garments designed by him are preserved in the Costume Institute at the Metropolitan Museum of Art, and the Fashion Institute of Technology holds a collection of sketches and drawings, as well as archives covering the years 1923 to 1959.
