= Rockie Gardiner =

American psychic and astrologer

- Born: Rochelle Gardiner; 1938; Brooklyn, New York, U.S.
- Died: October 31, 2008 (aged 69–70); United States
- Education: Barnard College
- Occupations: Astrologer, columnist
- Years active: 1983–2008
- Known for: The Rockie Horoscope
- Spouse: Peter Gardiner (m. 1958; died 1968)
- Children: Jeremy Gardiner

Rochelle "Rockie" Gardiner was an American astrologer. Her syndicated astrology column, The Rockie Horoscope, appeared in a variety of publications (mostly alternative weekly newspapers) and on her own website. She also gave custom astrological readings for individuals.

== Biography ==
She was born in 1938 in Brooklyn, New York, and raised in Lawrence, New York, on Long Island. Gardiner was a Sagittarius. She attended Syracuse University and graduated from Barnard College.

Following graduation, she worked as an editor of children's books at Doubleday Publishing, along with Arthur Miller and Shirley Jackson.

In 1958, she married Peter Gardiner, a pioneering film director of psychedelic "pop films" that were predecessors to music videos. Peter and Rockie had a son, Jeremy, born in 1963 and in 1966 the family moved to Los Angeles, California, where Rockie discovered an interest in astrology.

Peter died in 1968 and Rockie remained single the rest of her life. She died unexpectedly following a brief illness on October 31, 2008 at 11:11 a.m.

== Rockie Horoscope astrology column ==
Gardiner's astrology column, The Rockie Horoscope, first appeared in LA Weekly in 1983. Gardiner typically wrote a general forecast for each weekday telling about the overall astrological influences and how they would affect a given day. She would also write a general forecast for the week ahead. These would be followed by weekly sign readings for the individual sun signs.

Her columns were known for their humor and wit. She frequently included pop-culture references to celebrities, politics, professional sports and pop music. Gardiner predicted that U.S. President Ronald Reagan would die in office and that George H. W. Bush would assume the presidency. She also prdicted that Jesse Jackson would be a vice-presidential candidate.

Sometimes, when she had not gotten around to updating her website, she would take down the old information and post the following message: "Rockie is soaking up atmosphere and astrological insight."

Newspapers that carried her column included: The Improper Bostonian, LA Weekly, The Las Vegas Weekly, The O.C. Weekly, The Philadelphia Weekly, The Village Voice, and Vogue magazine. In addition to her newspaper column and website, she also sold customized sign readings to individuals.

== Sources ==
- RIP Rockie Gardiner, Astrologer, by KateC, Published November 5, 2008, on Deep Glamour.net. Retrieved on November 11, 2008.
- Rockie Ascendent: A Farewell to Our Favorite Stargazer, by Jeremy Gardiner and Kristen Stavola, Published November 5, 2008, in the L.A. Weekly. Retrieved on November 18, 2024.
- Rockie Horoscope: From LoveToKnow Horoscopes by Rdube and Kelly Roper. Retrieved on November 11, 2008.
