= Leslie Morris (designer) =

American fashion designer

Leslie Morris was an American fashion designer who headed the couture department at Bergdorf Goodman between 1931 and 1967.

She was born in New York. After attending a finishing school, Morris worked as a designer for Harry Collins before being employed in 1928 by Bergdorf Goodman department store to create couture-level clothing in their made-to-order salon. Unusually for a department store, Bergdorf actively promoted their in-house designers by name, despite Morris being notably publicity-shy. Her fellow designers at Bergdorf's included Russian royalty Grand Duchess Marie, and a Paris couturier called Valentine Tukine, before she was named head designer of the couture department in 1931. She also worked alongside Mark Mooring while he was at Bergdorf's between 1933 and 1948, and in 1941, Morris, Mooring and Mary Gleason were cited as the store's three best-known designers. Mooring, Morris and Gleason were regularly acknowledged as a strong design team while they were working together.

In 1957 Morris won that year's main Coty Award for fashion design, along with the ready-to-wear designer Sydney Wragge. At the time, her work was featured in Life magazine including an evening dress from 1951, with a note that the customers who commissioned her "quietly tailored suits" and luxurious ballgowns did so with the intention to wear them for six or more years; and also that it was rare for any Morris design to be made more than six times with many being further individually customized for the client.

Morris presented her last made-to-order collection at Bergdorf Goodman in March 1967, after 39 years in the industry. Two years later, Bergdorf closed their couture salon.

== Personal life ==
Morris was married to a lawyer from Philadelphia, where she lived and commuted to work from.
