= Lawrence, Nassau County, New York =

Village in Nassau County, New York, US

Lawrence, New York
- Village
- Incorporated Village of Lawrence
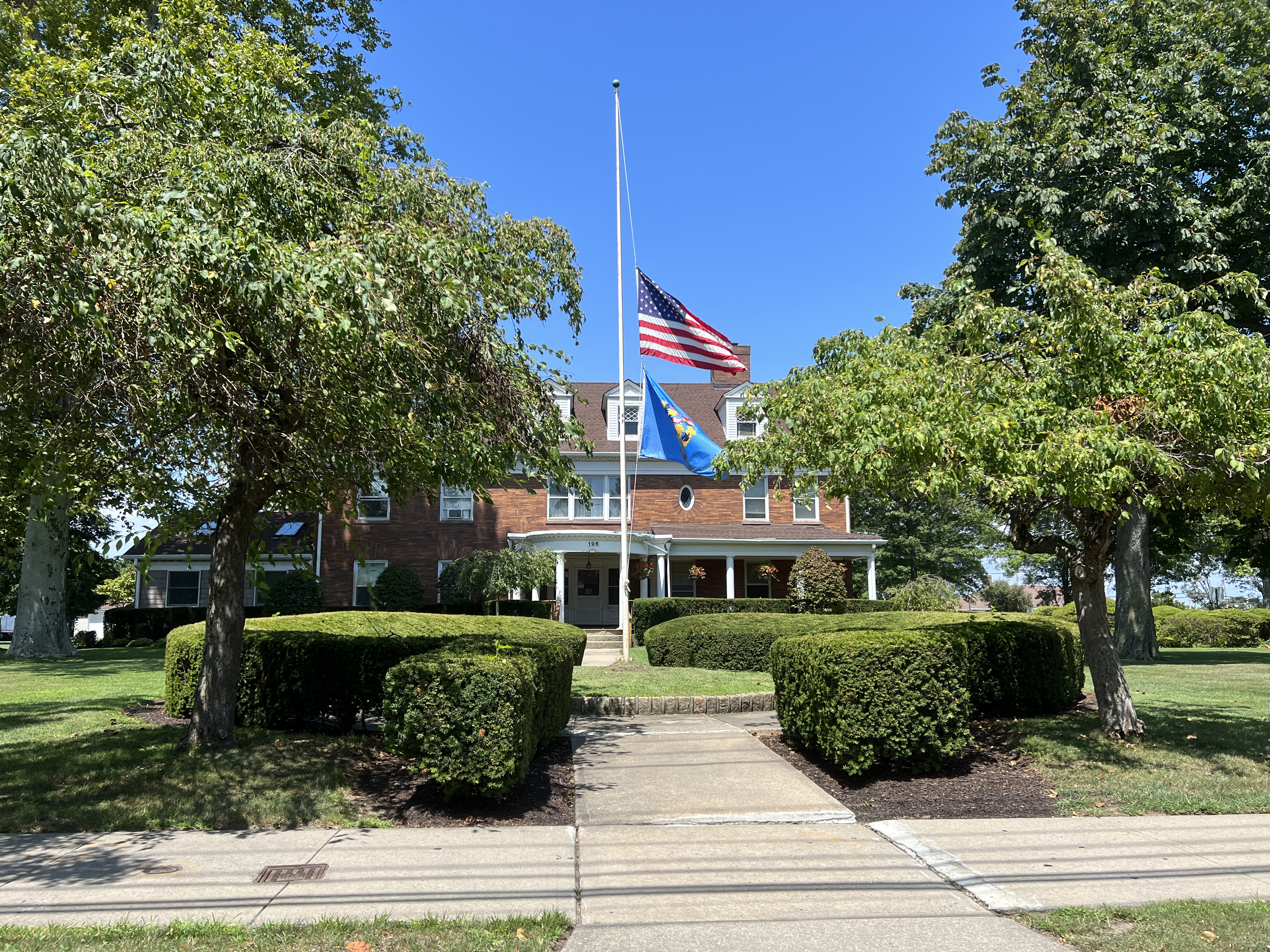
- Lawrence Village Hall in 2022

- Location in Nassau County and the state of New York

- Location on Long Island Location within the state of New York
- Coordinates: 40°36′34″N 73°43′36″W
- Country: United States
- State: New York
- County: Nassau
- Town: Hempstead
- Incorporated: 1897
- Named for: The Lawrence Brothers

Government
  - Mayor: Samuel "Shlomo" Nahmias

Area
  - Total: 4.64 sq mi (12.01 km^{2})
  - Land: 3.72 sq mi (9.63 km^{2})
  - Water: 0.92 sq mi (2.39 km^{2})
- Elevation: 20 ft (6 m)

Population (2020)
  - Total: 6,809
  - Density: 1,831.6/sq mi (707.17/km^{2})
- Time zone: UTC−05:00 (Eastern (EST))
  - Summer (DST): UTC−04:00 (EDT)
- ZIP code: 11559
- Area codes: 516, 363
- FIPS code: 36-41553
- GNIS feature ID: 0955101
- Website: www.villageoflawrence.org

Lawrence is a village within the Town of Hempstead in Nassau County, on Long Island, in New York, United States. It is located adjacent to the border with the New York City borough of Queens to the west and is near the Reynolds Channel to the south. The population was 6,809 at the time of the 2020 census.

Lawrence is one of the "Five Towns," which consist of the villages of Lawrence and Cedarhurst, the hamlets (unincorporated areas) of Woodmere and Inwood, and "The Hewletts", which is made up of the hamlet of Hewlett together with the villages of Hewlett Bay Park, Hewlett Harbor and Hewlett Neck, along with Woodsburgh.

== History ==
Old Lawrence, or Back Lawrence, is a part of the village, comprising many large homes, mansions, beach side villas and former plantations with very large property, a few dating back to the time of the American Revolution. This area, like Hewlett is unique because its rural affluence is similar in character to the more well known Gold Coast of the North Shore instead of being more urbanized like the rest of the South Shore of Nassau County. One of the area's oldest structures, Rock Hall – once home to two prominent families, the Martins and Hewletts – was constructed during colonial times and is now an active museum, Hewlett still being the most expensive city in the 5 towns.

Beginning in 1869, a railroad line was completed which originated in New York City and ran through the part of Long Island now called The Five Towns. Part of the land in that area was acquired by three brothers with the surname "Lawrence," which is who the Village was eventually named after. During the second half of the 19th century, it was a main vacation spot for the wealthy families until the 1890s. A series of hurricanes and nor'easters altered the coastline considerably and destroyed a large beachfront hotel. Lawrence could no longer boast direct access to the sands along the Atlantic Ocean. At the same time, Lawrence began to become a suburb, a village with schools, public facilities, better roads and a large town area that expanded into what it is now today.

In 1897, Lawrence incorporated as a village. This enabled it to gain local control of zoning and govern itself through municipal home rule.

Lawrence, or most notably Old Lawrence, was formerly home to a large upper class of White Anglo-Saxon Protestant families who lived there since the time of the American Revolution. From the 1940s to 1980s, it became a center of Reform and Conservative Jewish life that included the largest Reform synagogue on Long Island (Temple Israel). Many noteworthy residents grew up in Lawrence during this period.

In the late 1980s, Lawrence saw a large migration of Modern Orthodox Jews. The Orthodox Jewish communities are close to the more Haredi nearby center of Far Rockaway which has more yeshivas for the children and younger members as well as a variety of kosher restaurants and communal organizations. Central Avenue in Lawrence (and its continuation in Cedarhurst) has a large and growing number of kosher restaurants and other business catering to the Orthodox community.

== Geography ==
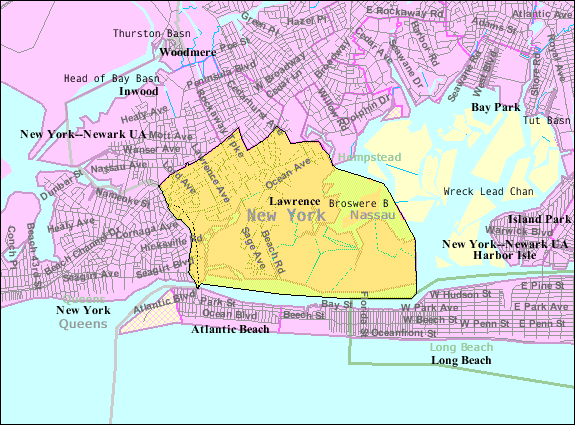
U.S. Census map of Lawrence

According to the United States Census Bureau, the village has a total area of 4.7 square miles (12 km^{2}), of which 3.8 square miles (9.8 km^{2}) is land and 0.8 square miles (2.1 km^{2}), or 17.91%, is water.

== Demographics ==
Historical population
| Census | Pop. | Note | %± |
|---|---|---|---|
| 1890 | 626 | | — |
| 1900 | 558 | | −10.9% |
| 1910 | 1,189 | | 113.1% |
| 1920 | 2,861 | | 140.6% |
| 1930 | 3,041 | | 6.3% |
| 1940 | 3,649 | | 20.0% |
| 1950 | 4,681 | | 28.3% |
| 1960 | 5,907 | | 26.2% |
| 1970 | 6,566 | | 11.2% |
| 1980 | 6,175 | | −6.0% |
| 1990 | 6,513 | | 5.5% |
| 2000 | 6,522 | | 0.1% |
| 2010 | 6,483 | | −0.6% |
| 2020 | 6,809 | | 5.0% |
U.S. Decennial Census

=== Racial and ethnic composition ===
Lawrence village, New York – Racial and ethnic composition Note: the US Census treats Hispanic/Latino as an ethnic category. This table excludes Latinos from the racial categories and assigns them to a separate category. Hispanics/Latinos may be of any race.
| Race / Ethnicity (NH = Non-Hispanic) | Pop 2000 | Pop 2010 | Pop 2020 | % 2000 | % 2010 | % 2020 |
|---|---|---|---|---|---|---|
| White alone (NH) | 6,082 | 6,075 | 6,095 | 93.25% | 93.71% | 89.51% |
| Black or African American alone (NH) | 64 | 86 | 85 | 0.98% | 1.33% | 1.25% |
| Native American or Alaska Native alone (NH) | 0 | 0 | 0 | 0.00% | 0.00% | 0.00% |
| Asian alone (NH) | 113 | 108 | 93 | 1.73% | 1.67% | 1.37% |
| Native Hawaiian or Pacific Islander alone (NH) | 1 | 0 | 0 | 0.02% | 0.00% | 0.00% |
| Other race alone (NH) | 2 | 6 | 116 | 0.03% | 0.09% | 1.70% |
| Mixed race or Multiracial (NH) | 37 | 23 | 112 | 0.57% | 0.35% | 1.64% |
| Hispanic or Latino (any race) | 223 | 185 | 308 | 3.42% | 2.85% | 4.52% |
| Total | 6,522 | 6,483 | 6,809 | 100.00% | 100.00% | 100.00% |

=== 2000 census ===
As of the 2000 United States census, there were 6,522 people, 2,113 households, and 1,629 families residing in the village. The population density was 1,694.6 inhabitants per square mile (654.3/km^{2}). There were 2,287 housing units at an average density of 594.2 per square mile (229.4/km^{2}). The racial makeup of the village was 95.2% White, 1.1% African American, <0.1% Native American, 1.7% Asian, <0.1% Pacific Islander, 1.0% from other races, and 0.9% from two or more races. Hispanic or Latino of any race were 3.4% of the population.

There were 2,113 households, out of which 37.6% had children under the age of 18 living with them, 69.7% were married couples living together, 5.5% had a female householder with no husband present, and 22.9% were non-families. 20.8% of all households were made up of individuals, and 13.0% had someone living alone who was 65 years of age or older. The average household size was 3.09 and the average family size was 3.62.

In the village, the population was spread out, with 32.6% under the age of 18, 6.9% from 18 to 24, 20.3% from 25 to 44, 24.0% from 45 to 64, and 16.1% who were 65 years of age or older. The median age was 37 years. For every 100 females, there were 94.2 males. For every 100 females age 18 and over, there were 89.7 males.

The median income for a household in the village was $104,845, and the median income for a family was $129,779. Males had a median income of $99,841 versus $41,094 for females. The per capita income for the village was $51,602. About 4.3% of families and 6.3% of the population were below the poverty line, including 6.2% of those under age 18 and 5.8% of those age 65 or over.

== Government ==
The Village of Lawrence is governed by an elected mayor and board of trustees. The Village of Lawrence Board of Trustees consists of a Mayor, a Deputy Mayor, and four Village Trustees (including the Deputy Mayor) – all of whom have term limits. The mayor may only serve three 2-year terms, and trustees are limited to four 2-year terms.

As of September 2025, the Mayor of Lawrence is Samuel "Shlomo" Nahmias, the Deputy Mayor is Aaron Felder, and the Village Trustees are Aaron Felder, Steven C. Gottesman, Aaron M. Parnes, and Tammy M. Roz.

=== Politics ===
In the 2024 United States presidential election, the majority of Lawrence voters voted for Donald Trump (R).

== Education ==
=== Public schools ===
The Lawrence Union Free School District includes all of Lawrence. It serves the communities of Atlantic Beach, Cedarhurst, Inwood, and Lawrence – along with sections of North Woodmere, Woodmere, and Woodsburgh.

=== Private schools ===
The Hebrew Academy of the Five Towns and Rockaway is a K-12 Modern Orthodox school where students study Jewish and secular subjects in a dual curriculum. The Pre-School, Kindergarten and Elementary schools are located on one campus on Frost Lane and Washington Avenue. The Brandeis School is a conservative Jewish Day School located in Lawrence.

Mesivta Ateres Yaakov is a yeshiva located in Lawrence. Rambam Mesivta, located on Frost Lane, is for grades 9–12 where students learn a dual curriculum of Jewish and secular studies. Lawrence is also home to the Shor Yoshuv Institute, a Rabbinical College with several hundred students.

== Transportation ==
The Lawrence and Inwood stations provides Long Island Rail Road service on the Far Rockaway Branch to New York Penn Station and Grand Central Madison in Midtown Manhattan and Atlantic Terminal in Brooklyn, with connections at Jamaica to other parts of Long Island.

The n31, n31x, n32 buses of Nassau Inter-County Express run along Central Avenue extending southwest into Far Rockaway (with a connection to the A train of the New York City Subway at Far Rockaway – Mott Avenue) and northeast to the Hempstead Transit Center in central Nassau County with connections to other parts of Long Island.

Lawrence is connected to Atlantic Beach to the south, across Reynolds Channel, via the Atlantic Beach Bridge.

== Emergency services ==
The Nassau County Police Department provides police services in Lawrence and most of Nassau County. Lawrence is part of the force's Fourth Precinct.

Lawrence is served by the EMS group named Hatzalah of Rockaway Lawrence.

Lawrence is served by the Lawrence–Cedarhurst Fire Department. The LCFD consists of 85 volunteer firefighters and emergency medical technicians and provides fire protection to the villages of Lawrence and Cedarhurst, as well as the North Lawrence Fire District and East Lawrence Fire District. The LCFD also responds to alarms such as car accidents and aided cases on the Atlantic Beach Bridge.

== Notable people ==
Notable current and former residents of Lawrence include:

- Ben Ashkenazy (born 1969), real estate developer
- Louis Auchincloss (1917–2010), lawyer, novelist, historian and essayist
- J. Stewart Baker (1893–1966), banker who served as the first president of Chase Manhattan Bank
- Stuart Beck (1946-2016), lawyer and diplomat for Palau who helped negotiate the Compact of Free Association, which established Palau as an independent nation in free association with the United States in 1994
- Avi Berkowitz (born 1988), Special Assistant to Jared Kushner and President Donald Trump, who participated in the formation of the Abraham Accords
- Bruce Blakeman (born 1955), First Presiding Officer of the Nassau County Legislature; Nassau County Executive
- Benjamin Brafman (born 1948), criminal defense attorney
- Beatrice Burstein (1915-2001), first female New York State Supreme Court Justice on Long Island
- John Burstein (born 1950), children's television personality who created the character Slim Goodbody
- Karen Burstein (born 1942), politician and former judge who was the unsuccessful Democratic nominee for New York State Attorney General in 1994
- Michael Cohen (born 1966), personal attorney for Donald Trump, was raised in Lawrence
- William Denson (1913-1998), military prosecutor and former Mayor of Lawrence
- Marc Stuart Dreier (born 1950), lawyer convicted for his involvement in a Ponzi scheme
- Bill Etra (1947-2016), live video pioneer and the co-inventor (with Steve Rutt) of the Rutt/Etra Video Synthesizer
- Rockie Gardiner (1938-2008), psychic, was raised in Lawrence
- Karen Friedman Hill (born 1946), whose life with mobster Henry Hill was chronicled in the 1990 film Goodfellas
- Jacob H. Horwitz, (1892-1992), businessman, philanthropist and a fashion innovator who was one of the first to specialize in junior miss and teenage clothing
- Donna Karan (born 1948), fashion designer
- Arthur Kopit (1937–2021), playwright, best known for Wings, Nine and Oh Dad, Poor Dad
- Arthur L. Liman (1932-1997), lawyer and chief counsel for the Senate Iran-Contra hearings
- Peggy Lipton (1946-2019), actress best known for her roles in The Mod Squad and Twin Peaks
- Steve Madden (born 1958), shoe designer
- Nancy McCartney, third wife of Beatle Sir Paul McCartney lived in Lawrence with her first husband Bruce Blakeman
- Alana Newhouse (born 1976), editor of Tablet Magazine
- Aaron Russo (1943–2007), entertainment businessman, film producer, director and political activist
- Israel Singer (born 1942), rabbi and professor who has held leadership posts in several international Jewish organizations
- Maxine Stuart (1918-2013), actress
- Spencer Suderman (born 1966), airshow pilot and Guinness World Record holder
- Lil Tecca (born 2002), hip hop and rap artist
- Bradley Tusk (born 1973), founder of Tusk Strategies, a political and strategic consulting firm based in New York City
- Rob Weiss, director/producer of Amongst Friends and Entourage
- Leslie West (1945-2020), of the hard rock group Mountain

== See also ==
- List of municipalities in New York
