= Spencer Suderman =

American airshow performer, flight instructor and aviation video producer

Spencer Suderman (born August 17, 1966 in Far Rockaway, New York as Spencer Denenberg) is an American airshow performer, Guinness World Record holder for most inverted flat spins, flight instructor, and aviation video producer. Suderman and his wife Stacey are residents of the Santa Clarita Valley of California, they currently reside in Valencia, California.

Suderman was raised by his maternal grandparents, Lillian and Harvey Suderman in Lawrence, New York. Harvey Suderman was a veteran aviator of the Second World War, having flown the B-17 Flying Fortress.
