= Victor Proetz =

American architect

Victor Hugo Proetz (1897–1966) was an American architect, designer, and author of poetry and verse.

== Career as an architect and designer ==
Proetz was born in Saint Louis, Missouri. He studied painting and design at the Art Institute of Chicago. His studies were interrupted by World War I, during which he served in the Navy, designing and constructing cantonments and fire houses.

After the war he enrolled in the Illinois Institute of Technology's architecture school and went on to win the Emerson Prize.

In 1924 he returned to Saint Louis and formed an architectural firm with Ralph Cole Hall. Between the World Wars their firm executed numerous commissions in various parts of the country. These commissions notably included the additions and alterations to the Hotel Adolphus in Dallas, Texas, which gained such wide recognition that it was publicized abroad.

Proetz moved to New York City in 1933 and during his time there produced forty designs for textile and wall paper.

In 1935 Proetz became vice-president and chief designer of Cosden Inc. (a.k.a. Cosden House), a firm which practiced a combination of architecture and decoration in New York. It was owned by Eleanor Neves Cosden, the wife of a millionaire Oklahoma oilman. From 1936 to 1937 Proetz worked out of the firm's new London office, on the first penthouse in London, for Lord and Lady Louis Mountbatten. It was located in a newly constructed apartment building called Brook House; the name honored Lady Louis Mountbatten's father's mansion, which had stood on the site and which was demolished by the Mountbattens to make way for the more modern structure. The apartment building was destroyed during World War II.

Lord and Taylor invited him in 1943 to become director of their interior decorating department. He produced a group of full-scale interiors displayed at the Lord and Taylor's store in New York. They won wide critical acclaim for the use of traditional materials in combination with contemporary design, as well as the use of unconventional materials. One of the features most favorably remarked upon was the use of ordinary butcher paper as a veneer base for clear lacquer, and other similar devices. He was also commended for his spare use of the fine materials that normal people did not have access to during the war.

Proetz designed the Brooklyn Museum's 19th-century period rooms, the porcelain gallery for the Saint Louis Art Museum, and a series of public rooms and offices for the Smithsonian Museum's National Portrait Gallery.

Through the years, Proetz continually broadened his repertoire. He produced over 2,000 designs for furniture, textiles, lighting fixtures, ceramics, glass, and other things, executed here and abroad. He did this all while continuing his architectural practice in which he completed commissions in New York, Long Island, Philadelphia, St. Louis, Lake Forest, Dallas, Palm Beach, San Francisco, and London. He also designed interiors for yachts and the officers’ quarters on a British airplane carrier.

== Career as an author ==
In 1934, while living in New Haven, Connecticut Proetz wrote and illustrated a series of articles called Comparative Studies of Regional Architecture in the United States published by House & Garden. Later he would write various articles about contemporary architecture, decorative arts in Sweden, the Classical Revival in America, and kindred subjects. His article, Private Museums and The Virtue of Curiosity, a history of the private museum, was published in 1962 by The American Association of Museums's Museum News.

Proetz self-published a book of poetry in 1965 called Milestones Under Water and Other Monticules.

In 1971, five years after his death, the New Yorker magazine published his essay The Astonishment of Words (also published in book form by the University of Texas press). It details the inadequacy of the translated versions of such texts as:

- The English translation of the Gaelic Rune of Hospitality
- Yankee Doodle
- W. H. Auden's Look, Stranger
- William Blake's Tiger Tiger
- Robert Burns's To a Mouse
- excerpts from Lewis Carroll's Alice's Adventures in Wonderland
- Lewis Carroll's Jabberwocky
- Emily Dickinson's I Lost a World—the other day
- Samuel Taylor Coleridge's Kubla Khan

Examples of these texts are included, translated to French and German, then translated back into English. Through the whole essay he marvels at and displays the absurdity of such a task.
