= List of regional nicknames used in English language =

The list of regional nicknames used in English language includes nicknames for people based on their locality of origin (birthplace, place of permanent residence, or family roots).

Nicknames based on the country (or larger geopolitical area) of origin may be found in the List of ethnic slurs.

== Terms based on specific locations ==
=== A ===
Arkansawyer
A person from Arkansas.
Arkie/Arky
(US) A person from Arkansas.
Appler
(US) A person visiting Western Washington from Eastern Washington.
Aussie
A person or something originating from Australia.

=== B ===
Banker (or Outer Banker)
(US) a resident of the North Carolina Outer Banks. The term Banker may also refer to the feral horses living there.
Banana bender
(Australia) A person from Queensland (one who puts the bend in bananas).
Boricua
(Latin America, Hispanics in the USA) A person from Puerto Rico.
Bluenose, Bluenoser
(Canada) A person from Nova Scotia. In use since early 19th century. The name of the famous Nova Scotian racing schooner Bluenose. Often used proudly.
Bonacker
(US) A working class person from the Springs neighborhood of East Hampton, New York; from neighboring Accabonac Harbor.
Brummie
(UK) A person from Birmingham; also the dialect spoken there; from "Brummagem", an archaic pronunciation of Birmingham.
Buckeye
A person from Ohio. Name coming from the state tree. Also the athletic nickname of Ohio State University.

=== C ===
Cabbage patcher
(Australia) A person from the state of Victoria, arising from the state being nickname of Victoria (from the 1880s) as a ‘cabbage garden’ referring, somewhat slightingly, to the small size of the state.
Cajun
(US) A person of French heritage from Louisiana (mainly the southern portion of the state); derived from 'Acadian'
Canuck
A person from Canada.
Capixaba
People born in the Brazilian state of Espírito Santo are called this nickname
Carioca
(Brazil) A person from the city of Rio de Janeiro.
Candango
(Brazil) Nickname given to construction workers, who came mainly from the Brazilian Northeast, who worked in the construction of Brasília.
Catracho
(Central America) A person from Honduras.
Chamo
A person from Venezuela.
Cheesehead
(US) A person from Wisconsin, in reference to the many dairy farms and cheese factories there. Also extended to fans of the state's National Football League team, the Green Bay Packers. This term is widely used disparagingly by people from Illinois, a bordering state and frequent sports rival, although many Wisconsin sports fans embrace this name by donning large triangular blocks of ersatz cheese on their heads during sporting events.
Chilango, defeño, capitalino
(Mexico) A person from Mexico City. Residents of the city widely use Chilango to refer to themselves, but consider the term's use by anyone else to be derogatory. Defeño may be used in either a positive or negative sense. Capitalino is generally accepted as a neutral demonym, although it can also be used negatively.
Cockney
(UK) A person from east London. Geographically and culturally, it often refers to working class Londoners, particularly those in the East End. Linguistically, it refers to the form of English spoken by this group, but traditionally it only applies to those born within earshot of the Bow Bells.
Cockroach
(Australia) A derogatory term for a New South Welshman, originating from the State of Origin
Cohee
(US) An independent Scots-Irish small farmer from the Piedmont or Appalachian Mountains parts of Virginia.
Conch
(US) originally a native of the Bahamas, now used to refer to residents of the Florida Keys, particularly the "Conch Republic" of Key West
Corn-cracker
(US) A person from Kentucky.
Cornhusker
(US) A person from Nebraska.
Croweater
(Australia) A person from the state of South Australia, due to their tendency to hunt and eat crows in Victoria during the Victorian Gold Rush.
Culchie
(Ireland) An Irish term for an unsophisticated rural dweller (generally pejorative).

=== D ===
Dallie or Dally
(New Zealand) A New Zealander of Croatian descent, a corruption of the word Dalmatian.

Doonhamer
(Scotland, UK) A native of Dumfries, a reference to the southerly location of Dumfries and the fact that people working away from Dumfries refer to going "doon hame" (down home) when returning there .

=== F ===
F.I.B.
(US) Acronym meaning “Fucking Illinois Bastard”. Used by Wisconsinites and Michiganders generally, but not exclusively, in the context of poor Illinois drivers on Wisconsin and Michigan roads cutting locals off.
Foolio
(US) A person from the state of Minnesota.
Fudgie
(US) Term used by locals in Northern Michigan to describe tourists who patronize the region's fudge shops.

=== G ===
Gaúcho
(Brazil) A person from Rio Grande do Sul. For usage in the rest of South America, see "Terms for people from non-specific geographical areas" below.
Geordie
(UK) A person from Newcastle Upon Tyne, Tyneside, and also the dialect spoken there.
Gult, Gulti, Gulte
(India) A person from Andhra Pradesh or a speaker of Telugu. The term could have originated from the word Telugu, which when spelt backwards sounds like Gulutey, shortened to Gulti. This is a pejorative term.

=== H ===
Hawkeye
(US) A person from Iowa.
Hidrocálido
(Mexico) A person from Aguascalientes, officially known as Estado Libre y Soberano de Aguascalientes, a state in north-central Mexico, a play on the name of Aguascalientes, which in English translates to "Hot Waters", as does the invented compound word Hidro + cálido. It's been adopted as the name of a newspaper and digital news web site in Aguascalientes, founded in 1981.
Hillbilly
(US) A person from the southern Appalachian Mountains, an uneducated person from the Southern United States.
Hoosier
(US) A person from Indiana; also the nickname of the athletic teams at Indiana University Bloomington, and frequently used as an adjective for students or fans of that school. Also a term synonymous with hillbilly or redneck when used by those in the St. Louis area.

=== J ===
Jackeen
(Ireland) A pejorative term for a Dubliner or any Irish person that is seen as overly anglophilic: possibly a reference to the term Jacobite. More likely a reference to the high turnout (250,000+) for King George V's state visit to Ireland in July 1911. Crowds enthusiastically waved Union Jacks in greeting, an easy source of ridicule once British rule ended in 1922. The -een suffix is a Hiberno English diminutive meaning little.
Jafa, JAFA
(New Zealand) A person from Auckland, from Just Another Fucking Aucklander (or, more politely, Just Another Friendly Aucklander). (UK) Borrowed by Londoners to mean an Australian, as in Just Another Fucking Australian.
Swansea Jack
(UK) A person from Swansea
Janner
(UK) A person from Plymouth.
Jarocho
(Mexico) A person from Veracruz, either the city or the state.
Jayhawker
(US) A person from Kansas.

=== K ===
Kaaskop
A person from the Netherlands. Cf. 'cheesehead'.
Kiekefretter
A person from Brussels. Cf. 'chickeneater'.
Kiwi
A person from New Zealand.
Kraut
A person from Germany (often offensive)

=== L ===
Leodesian, Loiner
(UK) A person from Leeds. "Leodensian" is an irregular Latin-derived demonym; "Loiner" is of uncertain provenance.

=== M ===
Mackem
(UK) A person from Sunderland. Also spelled "Makem", "Maccam", and "Mak'em". Rarely used, except by themselves and their neighbouring Geordies. This is due to the rivalry of the cities when employment was scarce in the 1920s.The people from Sunderland made the jobs "Mak'em" and the people from Newcastle took them, "Tak'em". The saying goes, "We Mak'em and they Tak'em". Most English people can't distinguish the two.
Madrasi
(India, formerly derogatory, now occasionally derogatory) A person from the city of Chennai. Formerly used to refer to any resident of Madras Presidency and later applied to residents of any of the four southern states.
Michigander
(US) A person from Michigan.
Monkey Hanger
(UK) A person from Hartlepool. May be considered offensive, but also used with pride by the inhabitants themselves. Coined in the 1830s from the Napoleonic Wars 20 years previously. The people of Hartlepool captured a French ship off the North East coast of England, and finding the only survivor on the ship was a monkey, hanged it thinking it was a spy. Hartlepool United F.C, have a mascot called H'Angus the Monkey
Moonrakers
(UK) Natives of the county of Wiltshire. Not considered offensive.

=== N ===
Newfie, Newf
(Canada) A person from Newfoundland. This is a pejorative term.
Knickerbocker
(US) a person from New York.
Nutmegger
(US) A person from Connecticut.
Nipper
(UK, Isle of Wight) A young lad working on a boat.

=== O ===
Okie
(US) A person from Oklahoma, used on the West Coast (especially California) to refer to migrants from areas affected by the 1930s Dust Bowl in the Southern Plains states.
Ossi
(Germany) The informal name that people in Germany call former citizens of the German Democratic Republic before re-unification, while the counterpart for former citizens of West Germany is Wessi. It is said to imply a lack of sophistication, assets, or both.
Ozzy
(UK, Commonwealth and US) an Australian.

=== P ===
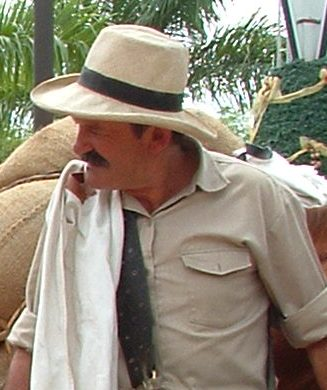
The fictional character Juan Valdez is a paisa stereotype.

Paisa
(Colombia) A person from the northwest of Colombia (Antioquia, Caldas, Risaralda and Quindío). The name Paisa derives from the Spanish apocope of Paisano (fellow countryman). Although many refer to Paisas as an ethnic group, considered a genetically isolated population according to scientific studies. Paisas can be found in other regions where they have migrated. They have a particular way of speaking Spanish.
Pinoy
(Philippines) A person from the Philippines.
Polentone
(Italy) Used by southern Italians to refer to northern Italians. It stands for 'polenta eater'.
Pom
(Australia & New Zealand) The term for British people living in Australia & New Zealand. Slightly derogatory but also used in jest.
Porteño
(Argentina) A person from Buenos Aires.
Polak
(Polish) A person of Polish ethnic background or nationality. Considered pejorative in the US.

=== R ===
Regio, Regiomontano
(Mexico) A person from the northern city of Monterrey.
Rhodie
(Rhodesia) Originally either a white Zimbabwean or an old Rhodesian expatriate, now evolved also into a person nostalgic about Rhodesia.

=== S ===
Saffa / Saffer
A person from South Africa.
Sandgroper
(Australia) A person from Western Australia.
Sandlapper
(US) A person from either South Carolina in general, or the Sandhills region of South Carolina specifically.
Scouser
(UK) A person from Liverpool.
Sooner
(US) A person from Oklahoma; from settlers who slipped into the territory to stake claims "sooner" than the permitted date. The plural "Sooners" is also the athletic nickname of the University of Oklahoma.
Spud Islander
(Canada) A person from Prince Edward Island; from the potatoes or "spuds" grown there.
Stubblejumper
(Canada) A wheat farmer from Saskatchewan.

=== T ===
Taffy
(UK) A Welshman, specifically from the Cardiff region. From the River Taff. or the name Dafydd (David)
Tarheel
(US) a person from North Carolina; also the nickname of the athletic teams at the University of North Carolina at Chapel Hill, and frequently used as an adjective for students or fans of that school. The term “Tarheel” was used in Washington state to describe Appalachian migrants to the state (many of them from Western North Carolina), who mostly settled in Snohomish and Skagit counties, drawn to the logging industry in the Northwest.
Taswegian, Tassie
(Australia) A person from Tasmania.
Tapatío
(Mexico) A person from Guadalajara, Jalisco.
Terrone
(Italy) A person from southern Italy. Formed from "terra" (earth), the term is meant to invoke the ignorance and lack of "class" implied by American English terms like "yokel," "hayseed," "hillbilly," etc.
Tico
(Central America) A person from Costa Rica.
Tripeiro
(Portugal) A person from the city of Porto. Derives from the legend that the people from the city offered all its food to the Portuguese navigators keeping only the entrails of the animal, cooking them in a Porto fashioned way.
Trolls
Residents of the Lower Peninsula of Michigan are called so by the residents of the Upper Peninsula, because they live "under the bridge".
Tuckahoe
(US) A person of the wealthy slaveholding class from the Tidewater region of Virginia.
Tyke
(UK) A native of Yorkshire. Not considered offensive.

=== V ===
Vincy
(St. Vincent and the Grenadines) Colloquial term for someone from St. Vincent. Not considered offensive.

=== W ===
Wessi
(Germany) The informal name that people in Germany call former citizens of West Germany before re-unification, while the counterpart for former citizens of the German Democratic Republic is Ossi. It is said to imply a snobbish, dishonest and selfish attitude.

=== Y ===
Yat
(US) A person from New Orleans, from the phrase "Where y'at?" ("How are you?" or "What's up?")
Yellowbelly (Copthorne)
Yellowbelly (Lincolnshire)
(UK) A person from the county of Lincolnshire. Not considered offensive and of debated etymology.
Yinzer
(US) A person from Pittsburgh, from the use of terms like yinz, stillers, dawntawn.
Yooper
(US) A person from the Upper Peninsula of Michigan (the "U.P.").

=== Z ===
Zimbo
A person from Zimbabwe.

== Terms for people from non-specific geographical areas ==
Nicknames for people from rural, remote, etc. areas often bear a derogatory implication of unsophisticated, undereducated people, simpletons.

Carcamano
(Brazil) An offensive nickname for non-Iberian, mostly Italian immigrants. derives from the venezian word 'Carcamanu'.
Coastie
(US) A person from East or West Coast; used as a social stereotype in Midwestern universities
Cohee
(US) Originally (mid-18th century) -- a Scots-Irish settler into the Virginia Piedmont; later (late 18th century) -- a term for "poor white trash"; still later (early 19th century) -- a term indicating independent small farmer in the Virginia/Carolina/Tennessee/Kentucky area.
Eurotrash
(US) An offensive term for Europeans.
Ameritard
(EU) An offensive term for Americans.
Flatlander
A person from a flat plains area, to residents of adjacent hill and mountain areas.
Gaucho
(Argentina) A rural person from Argentinian grasslands. (For Brazilian usage, see "Terms based on specific locations".)
Goober
(US) A rural person with a "glorious lack of sophistication" (from the slang term for "peanut")
Guajiro
(Cuba) A rural person from Cuba.
Hillbilly
(US) A rural white person, esp. one from Appalachia or the Ozarks.
Redneck
(US) A rural white person. There are varying possible etymologies for this term. Primarily used to denote lower-class rural whites.
Swamp Yankee
(US) Refers to rural white, Anglo-Saxon, Protestant farmers in coastal plain areas of New England, particularly in Rhode Island and eastern Connecticut.
Teuchter
(UK) A person from rural parts of Scotland, for example the Gàidhealtachd, Northern Scotland, Galloway and the Borders.
Westie/Westy
(Australia, NZ) A person from the western suburbs of Auckland or Sydney, the slur implying lower class.
Woollyback
(UK) Generally used by scousers to indicate someone from outside of Merseyside, but indicating a certain rustic simplicity, or at least not having Liverpool's "glamorous sophistication". Slightly offensive.
Yankee/Yank
(US) A person from the United States. More specifically, a person from the Northern United States. Even more specifically, a person from New England.
Yardie
(Jamaica, UK, US) A person from Jamaica, sometimes derogatory, referring to gang membership or low economic status.
Yokel
(UK, US and Canada) An unrefined white person, implicitly rural and "hick" (not necessarily "white trash" but inclusive of same).

== See also ==
- List of provincial and territorial nicknames in Canada
- List of British regional nicknames
- List of ethnic slurs
- Lists of disparaging terms for people
- Term of disparagement
- Lists of nicknames – nickname list articles on Wikipedia
- List of adjectival and demonymic forms of place names
