= Yellowbelly =

Yellowbelly may refer to:

- Yellowbelly (Lincolnshire), a person from the English county of Lincolnshire
- Yellowbelly (Copthorne), a native-born resident of Copthorne, West Sussex, England
- A person from Wexford, Ireland, named so from the Wexford GAA county colours.
- Eastern yellowbelly racer (Coluber constrictor flaviventris), a subspecies of snake found in North America
- Yellowbelly rockcod, the cod icefish Notothenia neglecta (often included in Notothenia coriiceps)
- Yellow-bellied slider, an aquatic turtle found in the south-eastern United States
- Golden perch, an Australian fish, also called callop
- A Southern United States term for a coward
