= Racism in Italy =

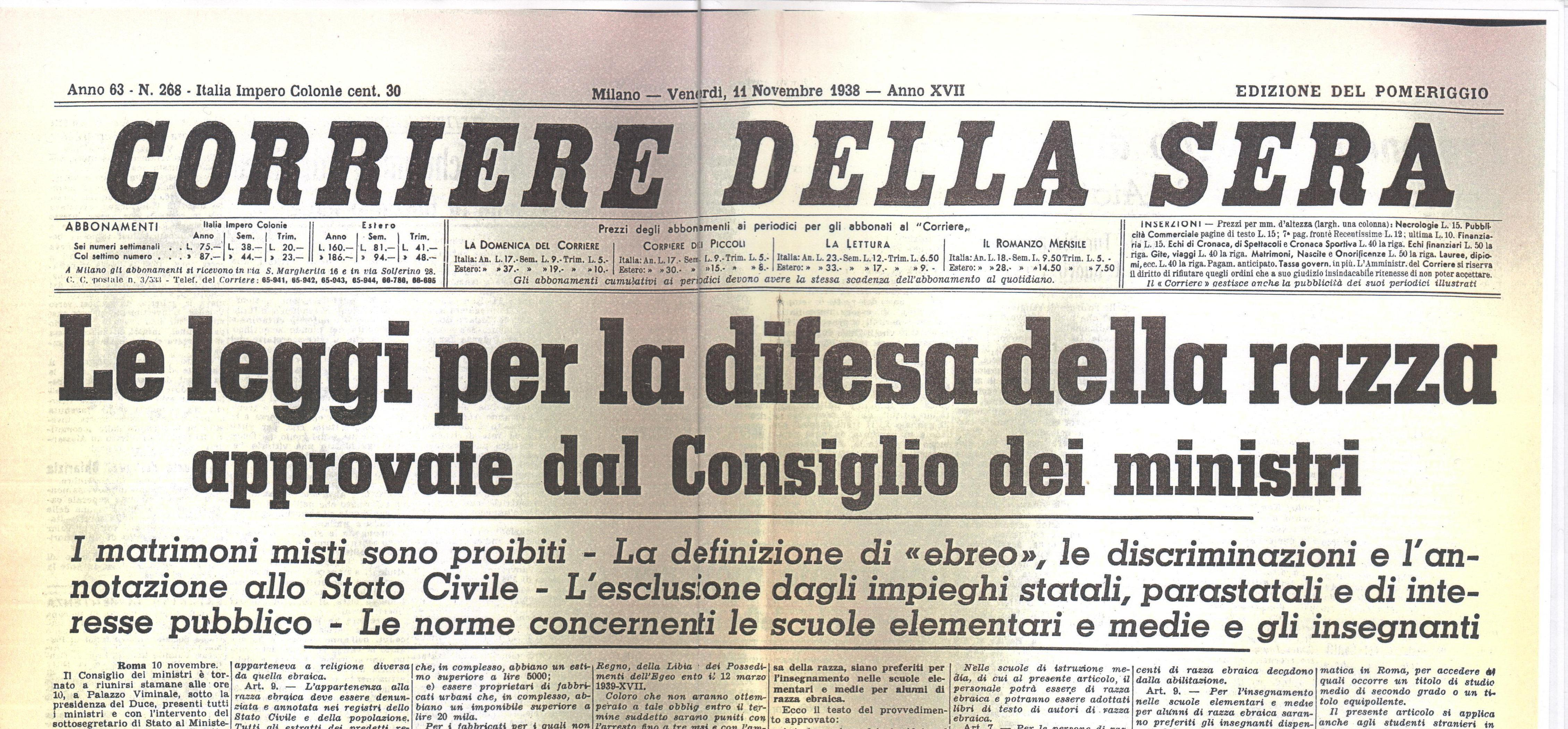
Front page of the Italian newspaper Corriere della Sera on 11 November 1938: "Le leggi per la difesa della razza approvate dal Consiglio dei ministri" ('The laws for the defense of race approved by the Council of Ministers'). On the same day, the Racial Laws entered into force under the Italian Fascist regime, enacting the racial discrimination and persecution of Italian Jews.

Racism in Italy is the discrimination of non-Italian ethnicities throughout Italy's history.

These ideas, albeit already common in relation to the internal affairs of the country, were first directed outwardly when the Kingdom of Italy began invading and colonizing various African countries with the purpose to build a colonial empire between the late 19th and early 20th centuries, although policies regarding "miscegenated" children (meticci) were unclear and confusing. Under Benito Mussolini's Fascist regime (1922–1943) were enacted a set of antisemitic laws, as well as laws prohibiting internal migration under certain circumstances, shortly after the consolidation of the political and military alliance between Fascist Italy and Nazi Germany. In the aftermath of Mussolini's fall from power, the Badoglio government suppressed the Racial Laws in the Kingdom of Italy. They remained enforced and were made more severe in the territories ruled by the Italian Social Republic (1943–1945) until the end of the Second World War.

The post-war migration from southern Italy towards the more industrialized northern regions engendered a degree of diffidence across the Italian social strata. A successive wave of immigration by extracomunitari (non-EU immigrants; the word has strong undertones of rejection) from the late 1980s, gave rise to political movements, such as the Lega Nord, hostile to both the so-called terroni (an Italian slur against southern Italians) and clandestini (illegal immigrants: this word also has a strongly negative connotation of secrecy and criminal behavior) from outside of Western Europe and the areas south of the Mediterranean.

In 2011, a report by Human Rights Watch pointed to growing indications of a rise in xenophobia within the Italian society. A 2017 Pew Research Center survey indicated Italy as the most racist country in western Europe. A 2019 survey by Sgw revealed that 55% of the Italian interviewees justified the perpetration of racist acts. On the occasion of a European Parliament resolution to condemn structural racism and racially motivated violence in 2020, around half of the Italian members voted against it. According to a 2020 YouGov opinion polling, the Italian interviewees claimed that the second most common cause of discrimination practiced in the country lie with racist prejudices. A 2020 Eurispes report revealed that 15.6% of Italians contend that the Holocaust never happened, and that 23.9% of the population adhere to the antisemitic conspiracy theories which claim that Jews control their economy. In April 2020 Nadeesha Uyangoda established the podcast Sulla razza (About Race), which focuses on racism, in particular translating and explaining the vocabulary used in Anglo-American contexts to discuss race. This language gap is something that Uyangoda felt was holding back racial discourse in Italy.

== History ==
=== Classical period ===
The term barbarian, derived from Ancient Greek, referred to aggressive, brutal, cruel, and warlike tribes or individuals. In ancient Rome, the Romans adapted and applied the term barbarian to non-Roman tribes such as the Germans, Celts, Iberians, Helvetii, Thracians, Illyrians, and Sarmatians. Later, with the inclusion of new territories, the previously barbarian populations became citizens of Rome. This happened first during the Roman Republic with the Italic tribes annexed and then gradually over the centuries throughout the Mediterranean and part of Northern Europe and forming the Roman Empire. The term barbarian still has a negative and derogatory meaning in contemporary Italy.

Ethnic stereotypes among the Romans included the belief that Asiatic Greeks, Jews, and Syrians were by nature more susceptible to living as slaves. Asia Minor was such an important source of slaves that the typical slave was stereotyped as a Cappadocian or Phrygian. In practice, Jews were "both slaves and slaveholders. They were the slaves of Jews and non-Jews and owned both Jewish and non-Jewish slaves" throughout the Classical period. Other perceived traits against Syrians and other Asiatic people included greed, gluttony, effeminacy, homosexuality, libertinism, and a tendency towards luxurious lifestyles and perverse cults. These qualities directly contrasted with the Roman ideal of robust and strong masculinity. The Romans firmly believed that interaction with these groups would pervert and corrupt their manly nature, while the Syrians would remain unchanged.

When the Vandals, a barbarian tribe, conquered Rome in 455, the term vandalic took on the derogatory meaning it still has today, due to the extreme devastation, massacres and thefts committed in Rome. In Roman Italy there was no concept of racism in the modern sense; there was discrimination between Roman citizens and barbarians, between pagans and christians, between free Roman citizens and slaves, which led to conflicts, wars and massacres.

=== Middle Ages ===
In medieval Italy, slavery was widespread, but was justified more often on religious rather than racial grounds. Over the course of the early medieval period, however, Steven Epstein states that people "from regions like the Balkans, Sardinia, and across the Alps" were brought over to the peninsula by Italian merchants, who thus "replenished the stock of slaves". Still, almost all the slaves in Genoa belonged to non-European races; the situation was different in Venice and Palermo, where emancipated slaves were considered free citizens in the 13th century.

=== 19th and 20th centuries ===
==== Lombroso and scientific racism in Italy ====
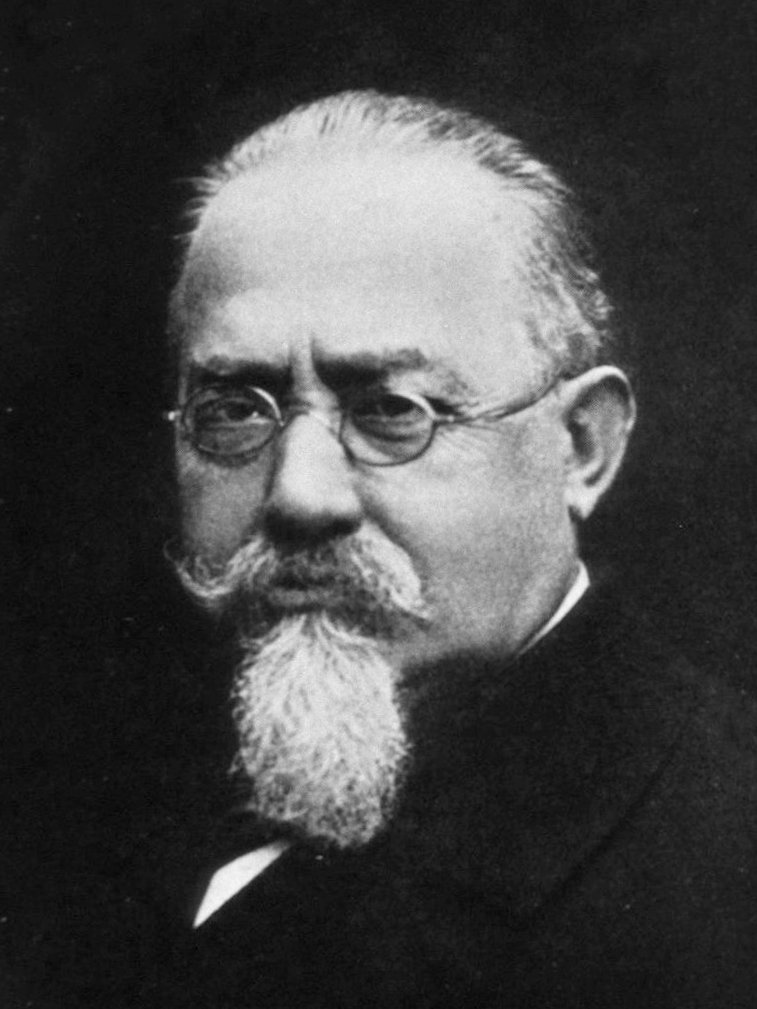
Cesare Lombroso, Italian eugenicist, criminologist, phrenologist, physician, and founder of the Italian school of criminology, born in Verona, Kingdom of Lombardy–Venetia, on 6 November 1835 to a wealthy Jewish family

Although there was already a wealth of Italian works engaging in racially motivated research on some groups, such as those pertaining to the "Oriental" character of ethnic Sardinians living under Savoyard rule, (Note: The Abruzzese novelist Domenico Ciampoli, while reporting on a royal visit to Sardinia in 1899 for the prestigious newspaper L'Illustrazione Italiana, so writes with regard to the local Sardinian peasantry: «Indeed, together and in each group, something about them reminds one of oriental religions, of remote races, of primitive paintings, and they seem like ritual symbols or allusions.» (L'Illustrazione Italiana, April 30, 1899, 286). The mainland painter Carlo Mazza, commenting on the sketches by the Sardinian artist Filippo Figari, gave vent to his disgust for «those niggers of Sardinia, who are hell bent on making their town hall a glorification of the Sardinian mastrucca and folk dance at any cost... As if their intellectual sphere could not expand beyond their memories of slavery, servitude, and Bedouin display of jubilation.» (Costumi : storia, linguaggio e prospettive del vestire in Sardegna, Ilisso, Nuoro, 2003, p.350). The Sardinian traditional garment, identified as an element of "Sardinian otherness" amongst the Italian circles, popular and educated alike, would be appropriated by the island's bourgeoisie in an effort to stress an identity of their own by way of showing the political and cultural ferments that had been then traversing the island (ibidem).) or their supposedly malevolent and "degenerated" nature, (Note: Dehumanizing language with regard to the island and the people thereof in Italian literature is considered to have been used starting with Dante Alighieri's De Vulgari Eloquentia, wherein the Sardinians are likened to «apes that imitate humans» (Lib. I, XI, 7) because of the language they used to speak. Moreover, in ancient Italian, the name of the island was also used as a metonymy to indicate a place where to dump dead or infected animals (Battaglia, Salvatore (1961). Grande dizionario della lingua italiana, UTET, Torino, V. XVII, p.578; "Sardigna, Vocabolario Treccani".). This anthropological view of the island also makes its appearance in many Savoyard works which aimed at dealing with the situation of the island; the philosopher and administrator of the Kingdom of Sardinia Joseph de Maistre, for instance, refers to the Sardinians as a race «unreceptive like no other to all the sentiments, tastes, and talents honouring humankind. The Sardinian is more savage than the savage, for the savage does not know any light whilst the Sardinian hates it. They are in fact lacking in the most desirable attribute of mankind, which is perfectibility.» (Oeuvres complètes, v. IX, pp. 410-411). Cfr. Francesco Casula (March 2017). "I sardi? Ladri e delinquenti. Ed anche "negri"". Il Manifesto.. It would not be until the First World War that the otherwise "primitive nature" of the Sardinian was positively celebrated on the battlefields in terms of their patriotic redemption for the mother country (see, f.e., M. Isnenghi, Il mito della grande guerra, Bologna, Il Mulino, 1989, pp. 398–404).) scientific racism as a proper discipline began to impose itself at the national level only through the works of the criminologist Cesare Lombroso, himself a Jew. Lombroso's theory of atavism compared the "white civilization" among the other races with the "primitive" or "savage" societies.

Lombroso would publish his thesis in the wake of the Italian unification, thus providing an explanation for the unrest developing immediately thereafter in the recently annexed portion of the new country; the people inhabiting the formerly Bourbon Kingdom were in fact racially stereotyped, thereby fostering feelings of northern Italian supremacy over the southeners, while being paradoxically integrated in the nation's broad collective imaginary; as the southeners were collectively constructed for the first time as an "anti-nation" within the new country, they were deemed "atavistic" alongside criminals and prostitutes.

Lombroso's theories connecting physiognomy to criminal behavior explicitly blamed higher homicide rates in Calabria, Sicily, and once again the overseas Savoyard dominion of Sardinia, upon some residual influence of "Negroid" and "Mongoloid" blood amongst their populations. According to Lombroso, facial features such as black hair, slight beard, bigger lips and longer nose were signs of such foreign "contamination" and directly correlated with a natural predisposition to delinquency.

In 1871, Lombroso published "The White Man and the Man of Color", aimed at showing that the white man was superior in every respect to other races. Lombroso explicitly stated his belief in white supremacy: «It's a question of knowing if we whites, who haughtily tower over the summit of civilization, ought one day to bow down before the prognathous muzzle of the black, and the yellow, and to the frightful face of the Mongol; if, in the end, we owe our primacy to our biological organism or to the accidents of chance. (...) Only we whites have achieved the most perfect symmetry in the forms of the body [...] possess a true musical art [...] have proclaimed the freedom of the slave [...] have procured the liberty of thought». Lombroso proceeded again to equate the criminal offending of the white population to some inherited physical traits, pointing to a varying degree of residual "blackness".

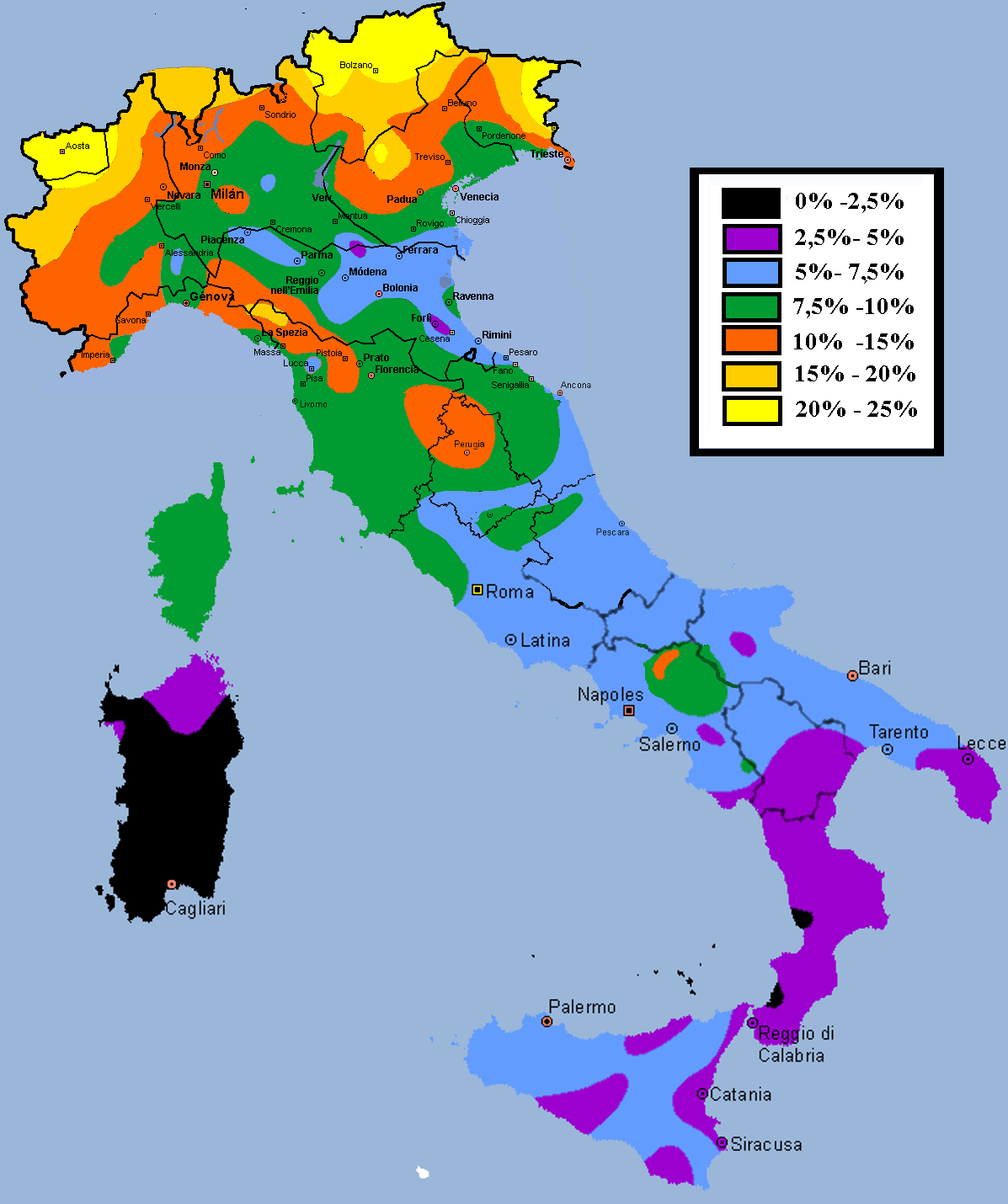
Geographical distribution of blond hair in the Italian geographical region, according to the physical anthropologist Renato Biasutti (1941)

Lombroso, who also wrote extensively on the topic of antisemitism in Europe and attacked anti-Semitic racial theory, distinguished between European Jews, whom he considered generally "Aryan", and traditionalist Jews whose religious practices he excoriated.

Other Italian anthropologists and sociologists also expanded on the theories previously set by Lombroso. The anthropologist Alfredo Niceforo, himself a southerner and more specifically a Sicilian, followed Lombroso's physiognomical approach, and postulated that certain ethnic groups were genetically predisposed to commit heinous crimes. The people Niceforo made initially reference to were originally the Sardinians; according to Niceforo, the reason as to why criminal behaviour was so entrenched in inner Sardinia firmly lay in the racial inferiority of the native Sardinian population, more specifically stating that it was due to latter's historical isolation and the resulting «quality of the race that populated those areas, a race absolutely lacking the plasticity which causes the social conscience to change and evolve».

However, Niceforo would later broaden the field of study to include also his Sicilian compatriots, as well as the whole population of the Mezzogiorno, in his theorisation of a particular "accursed race" that ought to be "treated equally with iron and fire and damned to death, like the inferior races of Africa and Australia". Alfredo Niceforo believed that Italy's regional divisions found their explanation in the fact that the country harboured two distinct races, the Alpine or "Aryan" in the north and the "Eurafrican" or Mediterranean in the south, and encouraged a statewide policy of race-mixing to properly civilize and dilute the most negative traits of the latter; the best example of such mixing, according to Niceforo, was historically provided by the Tuscans in central Italy. He also reasoned that the best course of action for Italy was to have it split into two different forms of government, which must be liberal in the north and authoritarian in the south. Dictatorship in the south would have to be applied by the central government, in line with the reasoning of the white man's burden that a "lesser" race would not be capable of self rule.

In 1906, Niceforo published a racial theory wherein blond pigmentation of hair and dark skin were both considered signs of foreign degeneration, while the "Italian race" was situated in a positive middle ground. Niceforo held these views as late as 1952, claiming that «Negroid and Mongoloid types were more frequent in the lower classes».

In 1907, the anthropologist Ridolfo Livi attempted to show that Mongolian facial features correlated with poorer populations. However, he maintained that the superiority of the "Italian race" was proven by its capability to positively assimilate other ethnic components.

The ideas expounded by Lombroso about race would enjoy a great deal of popularity in Italy, and would therefrom spread outward across the whole of Europe by the end of the 19th century.

==== Fascist regime ====
===== Antisemitism before 1938 =====
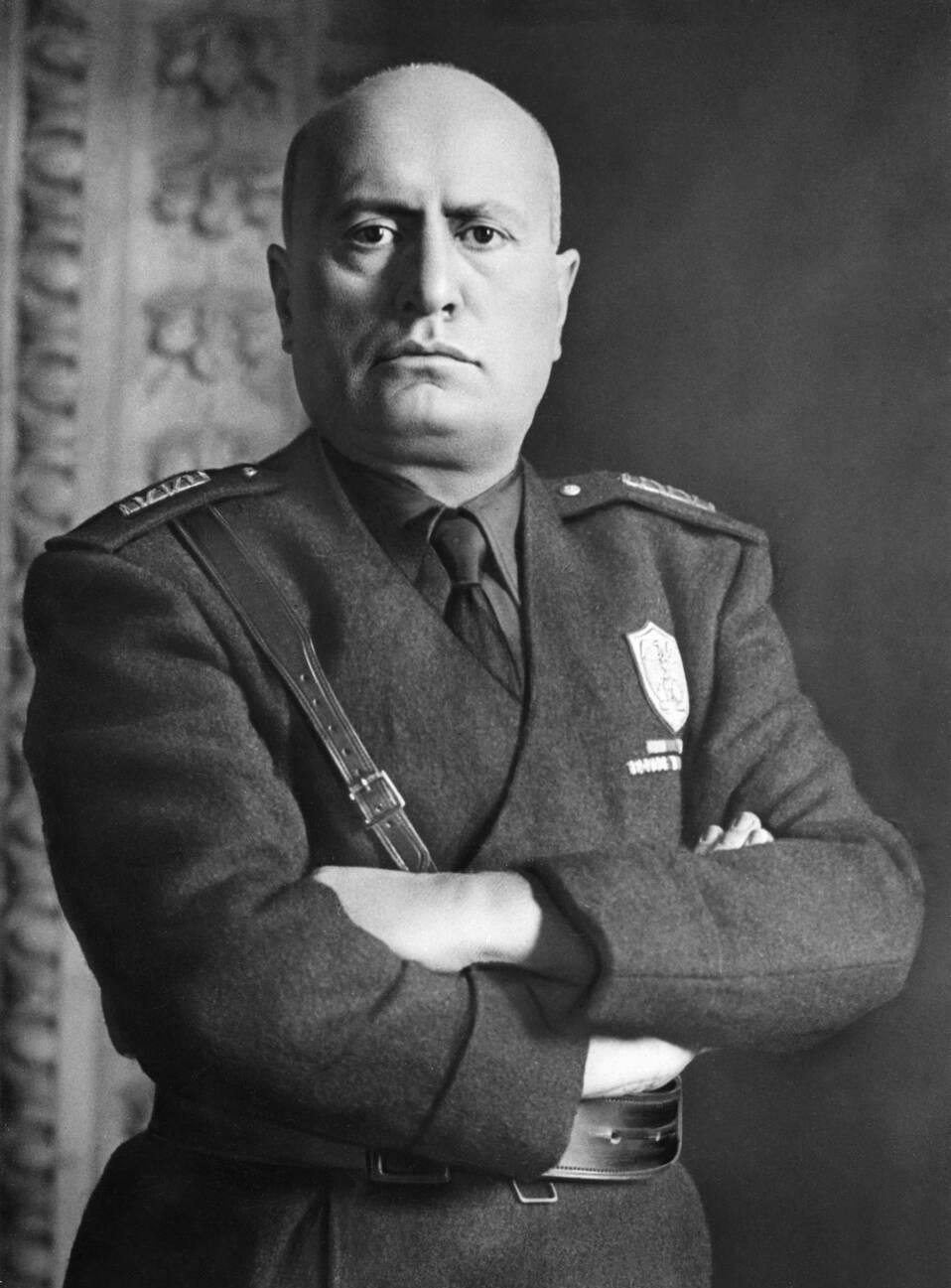
Benito Mussolini, who titled himself Duce and ruled Italy from 1922 to 1943

Jews fervently supported the Risorgimento, identified themselves as Italian nationalists, proved valiant as soldiers in World War I, and, in terms of their relatively small numerical presence within the general population, they later went on to form a disproportionate part of the Fascist Party from its beginnings down to 1938.

Until Benito Mussolini's alliance with Adolf Hitler, he had always denied any antisemitism within the National Fascist Party (PNF). In 1929, Mussolini acknowledged the contributions which Italian Jews had made to Italian society, despite their minority status, and he also believed that Jewish culture was Mediterranean, aligning his early opinion of Italian Jews with his early Mediterraneanist perspective. He also argued that Jews were natives of Italy, after living on the Italian Peninsula for a long period of time. In the early 1930s, Mussolini held discussions with Zionist leadership figures over proposals to encourage the emigration of Italian Jews to the mandate of Palestine, as Mussolini hoped that the presence of pro-Italian Jews in the region would weaken pro-British sentiment and potentially overturn the British mandate.

In the early 1920s, Mussolini wrote an article which stated that Fascism would never elevate a "Jewish question" and that "Italy knows no antisemitism and we believe that it will never know it" and then elaborated "let us hope that Italian Jews will continue to be sensible enough so as not to give rise to antisemitism in the only country where it has never existed". In 1932 during a conversation with Emil Ludwig, Mussolini described antisemitism as a "German vice" and stated, "There was 'no Jewish Question' in Italy and could not be one in a country with a healthy system of government." On several occasions, Mussolini spoke positively about Jews and the Zionist movement. Mussolini had initially rejected Nazi racism, especially the idea of a master race, as "arrant nonsense, stupid and idiotic".

Mussolini originally distinguished his position from Hitler's fanatical racism. More broadly, he even proposed building a mosque in Rome as a sign that Italy was the Protector of Islam, a move blocked by a horrified Pope. German propagandists often derided what they called Italy's "Kosher Fascism". There were however some Fascists, Roberto Farinacci and Giovanni Preziosi being prime examples, who held fringe and extremely racist views before Fascist Italy formed its alliance with Nazi Germany. Preziosi was the first to publish an Italian edition of the Protocols of the Elders of Zion, in 1921, which was published almost simultaneously with a version issued by Umberto Benigni in supplements to Fede e Ragione. However, the book had little impact until the mid-1930s.

It has also been indicated that Benito Mussolini had his own brand of racist views, his views on race were somewhat different from Nazism. Mussolini attempted to reconcile the divisive racial discourse which had developed within the nation by asserting that he had already resolved the southern question and as a result, he asserted that all Italians, not just northerners, belonged to the "dominant race" which was the Aryan race.

Mussolini originally held the view that a small contingent of Italian Jews had lived in Italy "since the days of the Kings of Rome" (a reference to the Bené Roma) and as a result, they should "remain undisturbed". One of Mussolini's mistresses, Margherita Sarfatti, was Jewish. There were even some Jews in the National Fascist Party, such as Ettore Ovazza who founded the Jewish Fascist paper La Nostra Bandiera in 1935. Mussolini once declared, "Anti-Semitism does not exist in Italy. ... Italians of Jewish birth have shown themselves good citizens and they fought bravely in [World War I]."

Despite the presence of a Fascist regime, some Jewish refugees considered Italy a safe haven in the first half of the 1930s. During that period, the country hosted up to 11,000 persecuted Jews, including 2,806 Jews who were of German descent. However, as early as 1934, Jewish personnel were removed from institutions and state organizations. 1934 also saw press campaigns against anti-fascist Jews, in which they were equated with Zionists. Between 1936 and 1938, the Fascist regime-endorsed antisemitic propaganda was mounting in the press and it was even mounting in graffiti. Equally, scholars of eugenetics, statistics, anthropology and demographics began to outline racist theories.

===== Racial laws =====
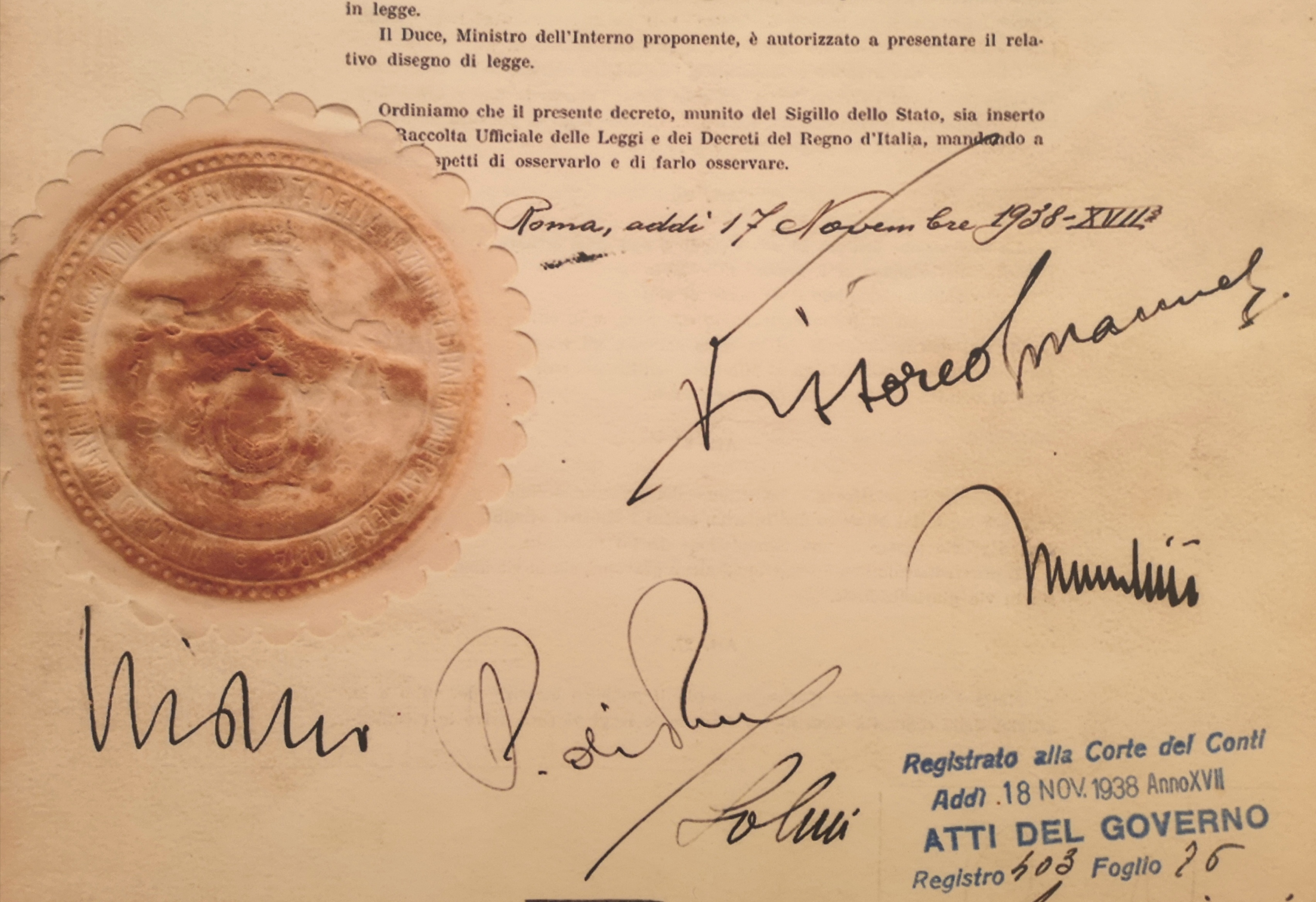
Italian racial laws, signed by King Victor Emmanuel III, Benito Mussolini, Galeazzo Ciano, Paolo Thaon di Revel and Arrigo Solmi

In 1937, the Second Italo-Ethiopian War led to the implementation of the first Fascist Laws which promoted explicit racial discrimination. These were the laws against madamato—that is, the concubinage between Italians and African women in occupied territories. The penalty for madamato was a prison sentence which could range from one to five years. Remarkably, one of the justifications of the laws was the belief that such relationships were abusive towards the women. In fact, in occupied Eritrea, women were married in accordance with the traditional custom of dämòz, a custom which was not legally recognized by the Italian state, thus, the husband was relieved from any legal obligations towards the woman. However, at the same time, a campaign against the putative dangers of miscegenation was launched in Italy. The Church endorsed the laws which stated that the "hybrid unions" had to be forbidden because of "the wise, hygienic and socially moral reasons intended by the State": the "inconvenience of a marriage between a White and a Negro", plus the "increasing moral deficiencies in the character of the children".

In the late 1930s, Benito Mussolini became a major ally of Nazi Germany, culminating in the Pact of Steel. The influence of Nazi ideology on Italian Fascism appeared in a 16 February 1938 press release by Mussolini in which some restrictions on Jewish people were suggested. An antisemitic press campaign intensified, with Jews blamed for high food prices and unemployment. The Fascist regime adopted an overtly racist position when it published the Manifesto of Race, originally published as Il fascismo e i problemi della razza ('Fascism and the problems of race'), on 14 July 1938 in Il Giornale d'Italia. The Manifesto was reprinted in August in the first issue of the scientific racist magazine La Difesa della Razza ('The Defense of Race'), endorsed by Mussolini at the direction of Telesio Interlandi. On 5 August 1938, Mussolini issued another press release, unlike the previous press release, this press release stated that restrictions would be imposed upon Jews. The press release noted that "segregating does not mean persecuting", but in fact, the persecution had already begun.

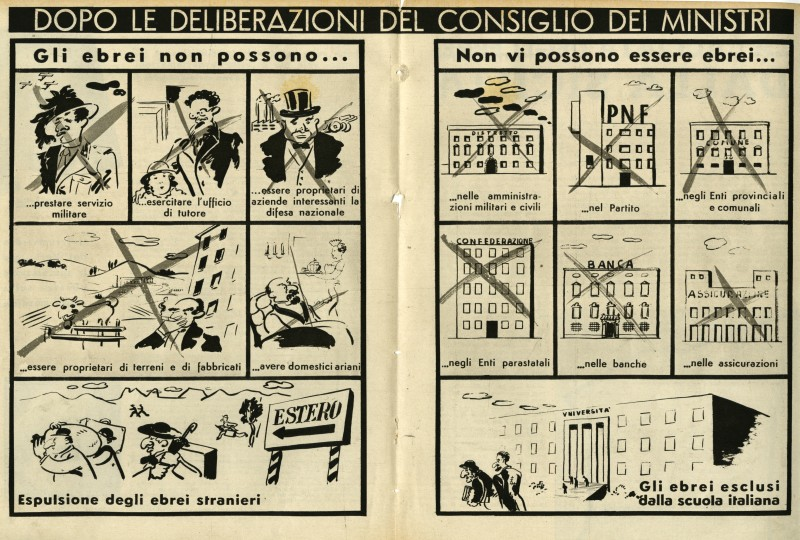
Antisemitic cartoon published in the Fascist periodical La Difesa della Razza, after the promulgation of the Racial Laws (15 November 1938)

The antisemitic metamorphosis of Fascism reached its culmination when the racial laws were imposed on Jews on 18 September 1938. Although they did not directly threaten Jewish lives, these laws excluded Jews from public education, the military and the government, and they also made it practically impossible for Jews to engage in most economic activities. Jews could not hire non-Jews. Marriages between Jews and non-Jews were also prohibited. Not all Italian Fascists supported discrimination: while the pro-German, anti-Jewish Roberto Farinacci and Giovanni Preziosi strongly pushed for them, Italo Balbo and Dino Grandi strongly opposed the Racial Laws. Balbo regarded antisemitism as having nothing to do with fascism, and asked Mussolini to mitigate somewhat the effect of the laws on Libyan Jews, not out of sympathy for he argued that the Jews were 'already dead' as a people, but rather because their presence there was advantageous to Italy's Libyan colony.

Fascist racism also impacted French, German, and Slavic minorities, the most notable manifestations of it were the Italian Fascist government's attempts to fully Italianize the Balkans' territories that were annexed after World War I.

===== World War II =====
During World War II, Italians engaged in ethnic cleansing. In the summer and autumn of 1942, as many as 65,000 Italian soldiers destroyed several areas of occupied Slovenia. Many areas were left almost depopulated after the killing and arrest of the residents. Between 1941 and the Grand Council's deposing of Benito Mussolini on 25 July 1943, 25,000 Slovenians (roughly 8% of the population in the Ljubljana area) were put in Italian detention camps.

In order to close Italian borders to all refugees and to expel illegal Jewish immigrants, Italian authorities complied with German requests to deport Jews in the occupied Balkans and French territories.

A pivotal event of the Jewish persecution in Italy during the war was the so-called razzia, or roundup of October 1943, in Rome. On the morning of 16 October 1943, German troops arrested as many as 1259 Jews for deportation to Nazi concentration camps. The Vatican, convents, monasteries and other Catholic homes and institutions had taken pre-emptive actions days prior to hide Jews, resulting in over four thousand escaping deportation.

Mussolini also played upon long-standing racist attitudes against Sicilians, enacting a number of laws and measures directed at anyone born in Sicily/of Sicilian descent. Regarding the treatment of Sicilians under Mussolini's regime, Count Ciano, Mussolini's son-in-law, wrote in his diaries on 4 October 1941: "The internal situation – coming apart in various places – is becoming grave in Sicily. ... So, then is it worse to be Sicilian than to be Jewish?".

===== Julius Evola =====
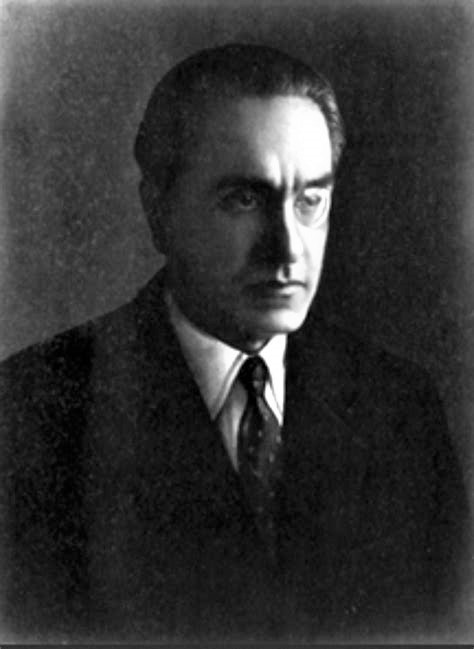
Julius Evola

Julius Evola was a prominent intellectual during World War II as well as during the post-war period, and was the main Italian theoretician of racism during the 20th century. Evola published two systematic works on racism, including The Blood Myth (1937) and Synthesis of the Doctrine of Race (1941). Furthermore, Evola discussed the subject in a substantial number of articles in several Italian journals and magazines. Evola also introduced the 1937 edition of the Protocols of the Elders of Zion, published by Giovanni Preziosi. Evola wrote:

Whether or not the controversial Protocols of the Learned Elders of Zion are false or authentic does not affect the symptomatic value of the document in question, that is, the fact, that many of the things that have occurred in modern times, having taken place after their publication, effectively agree with the plans assumed in that document, perhaps more than a superficial observer might believe.

WhileThe Blood Myth aimed at being an impartial review of the history and latest developments of racism theories in Europe, Synthesis of the Doctrine of the Race introduced the concept of spiritual racism. This concept met with the approval of Benito Mussolini. Mussolini was looking for a theoretical justification of racism different from that of biological racism, which was mainstream in Nazi Germany. Evola's brought together several underlying themes of her thought. Among those themes were anti-Darwinism, anti-materialism and anti-reductionism. Anti-Darwinism is the concept of history as regressive, positioning the apex of civilization at the beginning of history. For Evola, race existed on three levels: body race, soul race and spiritual race. The concept was pinned to a transcendent foundation. Evola wrote: "[r]ace and caste exist in the spirit before manifesting themselves in the earthly existence. The difference comes from the top, what refers to it on earth is only a reflection, a symbol." Evola explicitly criticized the Nazi racist view, deeming them "trivial darwinism" or "divinified biologism". For Evola, the Jewish race was not meant to be discriminated for mere biological reasons. In fact, Jewishness was essentially instead a "race of the soul, an unmistakable and hereditary style of action and attitude to life". Evola's spiritual racism was more powerful than biological racism, because it also recognized Jewishness as a spiritual and cultural component which tainted what Evola recognized as the Aryan race. Despite this peculiar theoretical elaboration, Evola's overall description of Jewishness was not particularly different from the common racist stereotypes of this period.

==== Post-World War II ====
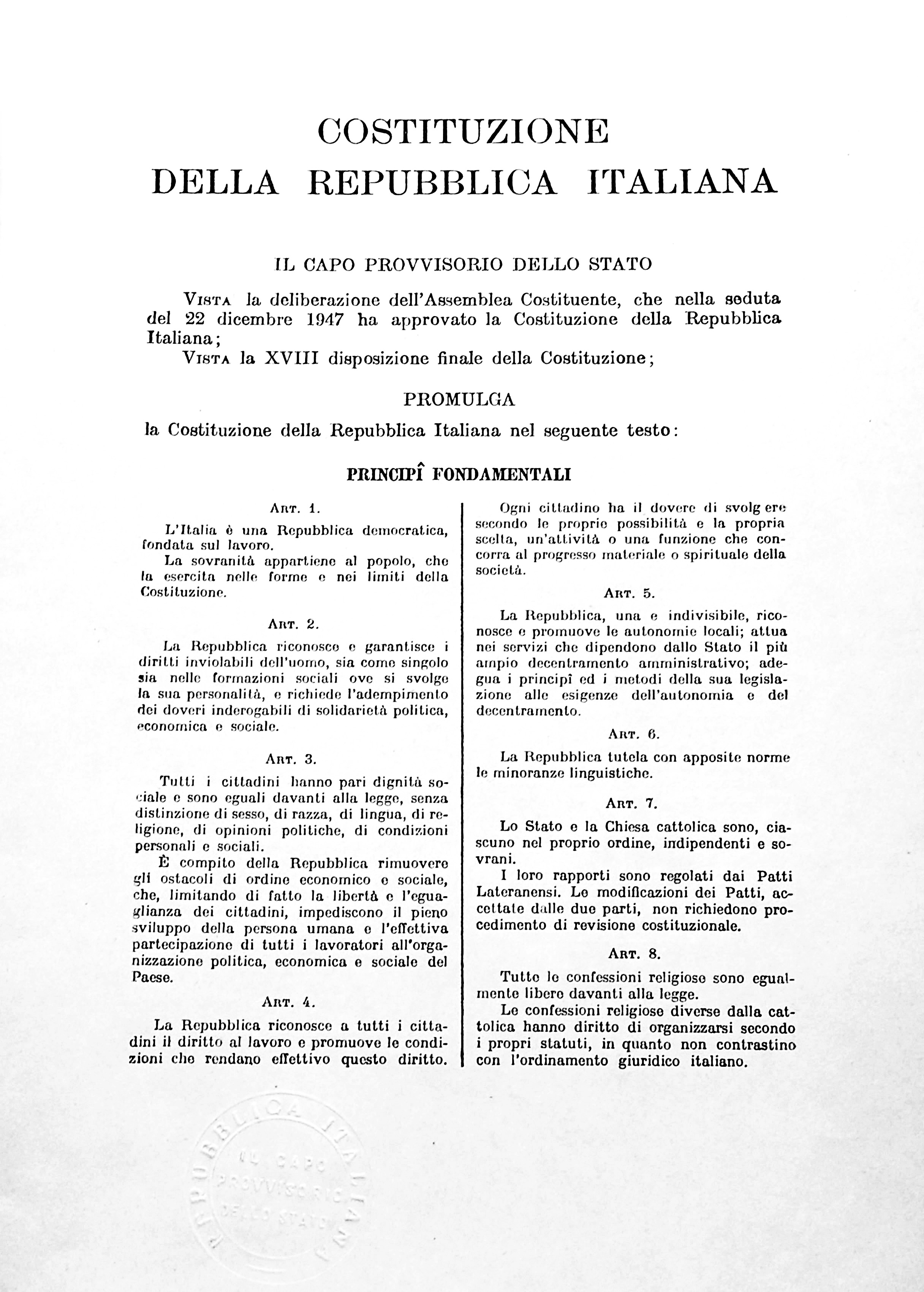
One of three original copies of the 1948 Constitution of Italy, now in the custody of Historical Archives of the President of the Republic. Article 3 the republican constitution officially rejected racial discrimination.

Article 3 of the 1948 Constitution of Italy, written by a Constituent Assembly formed by the representatives of all the anti-fascist forces that contributed to the defeat of Nazi and Fascist forces during the liberation of Italy, officially rejected racial discrimination, but implicit discrimination was practiced, including mixed-race children born in former Italian colonies facing barriers in gaining Italian citizenship. Article 3 of the 1948 Constitution of Italy states:

All citizens have equal social dignity and are equal before the law, without distinction of sex, race, language, religion, political opinions, personal and social conditions. It is the duty of the Republic to remove those obstacles of an economic and social nature which, really limiting the freedom and equality of citizens, impede the full development of the human person and the effective participation of all workers in the political, economic and social organization of the country.

— Article 3 of the 1948 Constitution of Italy

=== 21st century ===
==== Antisemitism ====
The ongoing political conflict between Israel and Palestine has played an important role in the development and expression of antisemitism in the 21st century, and in Italy as well. The Second Intifada, which began in late September 2000, has set in motion unexpected mechanisms, whereby traditional anti-Jewish prejudices were mixed with politically-based stereotypes. In this belief-system, Israeli Jews were charged with full responsibility for the fate of the peace process and with the conflict presented as embodying the struggle between good (the Palestinians) and evil (the Israeli Jews).

Holocaust denial has become a recurrent phenomenon in those years, and a movement for reaffirming values more consistent with traditional theology has been noted in the Catholic Church. A 2020 Eurispes report revealed that 15.6% of Italians contend that the Holocaust never happened, and that 23.9% of the population adhere to the antisemitic conspiracy theories which claim that Jews control their economy.

==== Anti-Romanyism ====
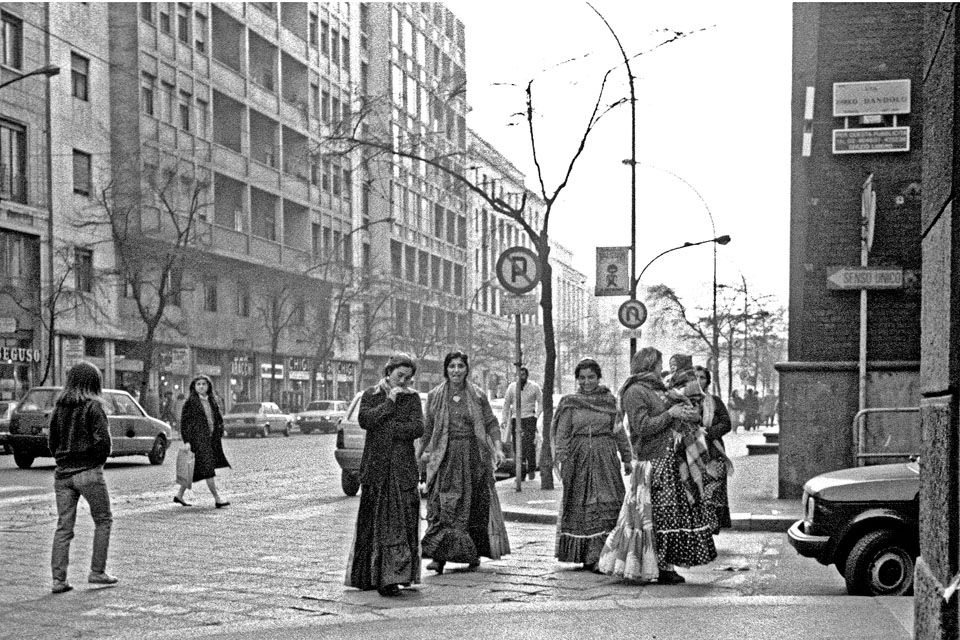
Roma women in Milan in 1984

Anti-Roma sentiment is widespread in Italy, and it consists of hostility, prejudice, and discrimination against the Roma people (Gypsies or "Zingari"). There is no reliable data regarding the total number of Roma people who live in Italy, but estimates put it between 140,000 and 170,000.

In Italy in 2007 and 2008, many national and local political leaders engaged in rhetoric which stated that the extraordinary rise in crime at the time was mainly due to the uncontrolled immigration of people of Roma origin from Romania which had recently become a European Union member state. National and local leaders announced their plans to expel Roma from settlements which were located both in and around major cities as well as their plans to deport illegal immigrants. In May 2007, the mayors of Rome and Milan signed "Security Pacts" which "envisaged the forcible eviction of up to 10,000 Romani people".

In October 2007, an extraordinarily high level of anti-immigrant sentiment exploded into violence which was generally directed against Romanian immigrants and was specifically directed against Roma immigrants. The violence was triggered by the murder of 47-year-old Giovanna Reggiani, a naval captain's wife, which was attributed to a Romanian immigrant of Roma origin. Reggiani was raped, beaten, left in a ditch, and died the following week. The Italian government responded by rounding up Romanian immigrants and summarily expelling some two hundred of them, mostly Roma, in defiance of E.U. immigration rules. According to the then Mayor of Rome Walter Veltroni, Romanians of Roma origin made up 75 percent of those who raped, stole and killed in the first seven months of the year.

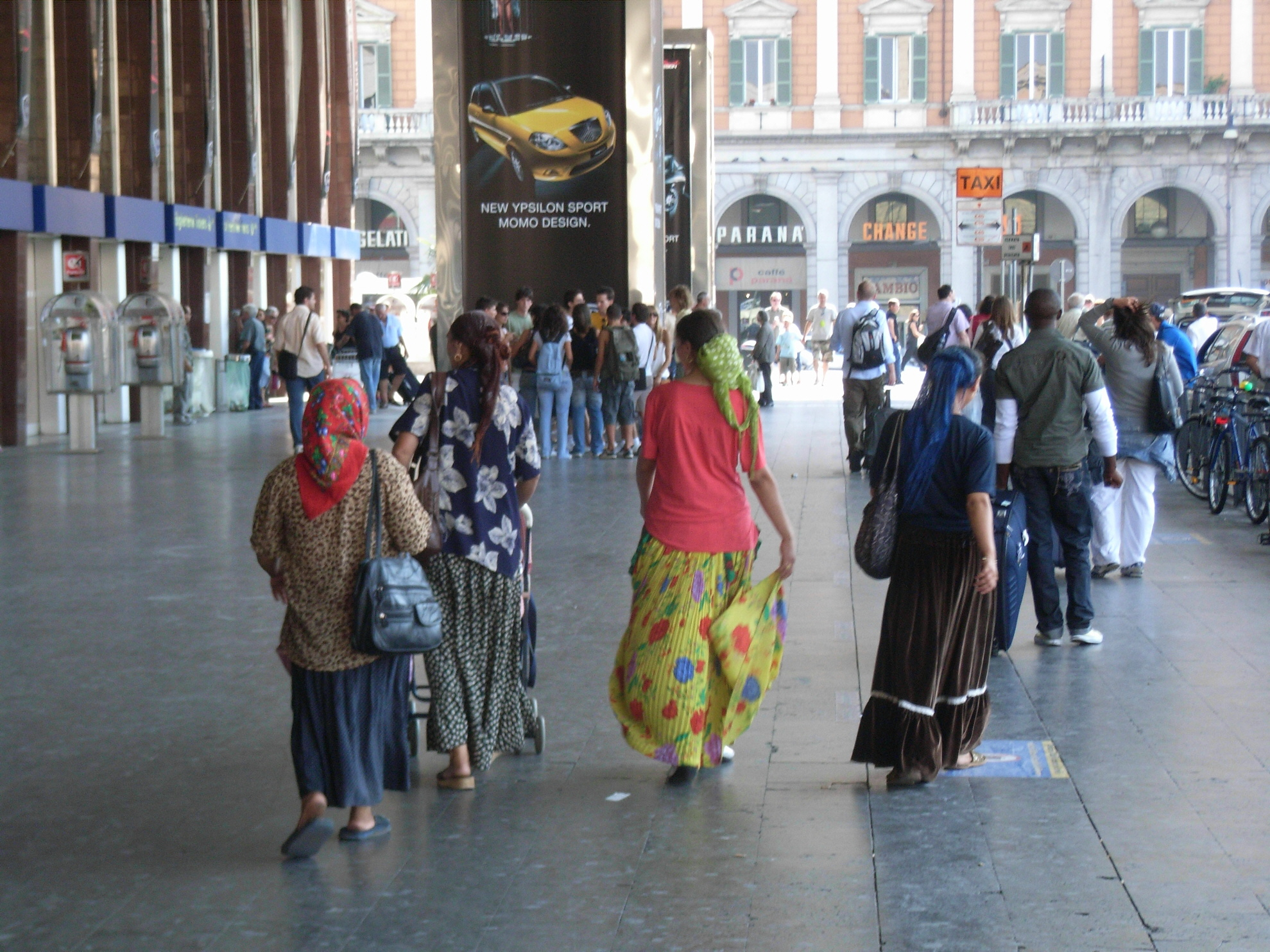
Roma women at Roma Termini railway station in 2007

The Greater Romania Party announced on 8 November 2007 that it would withdraw its five members from the Identity, Tradition, Sovereignty political group on 12 November 2007 over comments made by Alessandra Mussolini regarding the expulsion of Romanian criminals from Italy in early November 2007, thus dooming the European parliamentary group to falter less than a year after its creation. According to Romanian MEP and former ITS deputy chairman Eugen Mihaescu the final straw was the "unacceptable amalgam" Mussolini made between criminal gypsies and the entire Romanian population.

In May 2008, an unnamed 16-year-old Roma Romanian girl who was from a different part of town was arrested for trying to snatch an unattended six-month-old baby. After that mobs in several areas around Naples attacked Roma communities, setting homes alight, and forcing hundreds of Roma to flee. The camp in Ponticelli was set on fire each month between May and July 2008.

According to a May 2008 poll, 68% of Italians wanted to see all of the country's approximately 150,000 Gypsies, many of whom were Italian citizens, expelled. The survey, published as mobs in Naples burned down Gypsy camps that month, revealed that the majority also wanted all Gypsy camps in Italy to be demolished.

A 2015 poll conducted by Pew Research found that 86% of Italians have unfavorable views of Romani people. The 2019 poll of the same think-tank found that still 83% of Italians have negative views of Romani people, the highest percentage of European countries surveyed.

On June 18, 2018, Minister of the Interior Matteo Salvini announced the government would conduct a census of Romani people in Italy for the purpose of deporting all who are not in the country legally. However this measure was criticized as unconstitutional and was opposed by all the oppositions and also by some members of the M5S.

In 2023, the Italian chant of "attenzione pickpocket" has become an international viral sensation. Monica Poli, a city councilor representing the right-wing Lega party in Venice, alerted people by calling out pickpockets in the streets of the city; however, some social media users did not believe that the subjects of the videos were committing crimes every time she observed them and they also accused her of ethnically profiling Romani people based on stereotypes. Poli's group Cittadini Non Distratti – undistracted citizens – has existed for nearly 30 years but has only recently become viral after they created a TikTok account.

==== Anti-southern Italian sentiment ====
In recent decades, there have been a handful of examples of anti-southern Italian sentiments in northern and central Italy. Southern Italians who have moved to northern and central parts of the country, where they are called terroni by many people, may face discrimination due to their sociocultural background, which is different from that of northern Italians. Southern Italians, in turn, call Italians from the northern regions polentoni. The epithets terroni and polentoni have anti-ethnic connotations, aimed at pointing out an alleged ethnic and cultural inferiority, even if often used only in a joking way.

The term terroni certainly originates from the word terra (lit. 'land'), with developments that are not always clear, and was perhaps linked in the past by the denominations of southern areas such as the Terra di Lavoro (in Campania) or the Terra di Bari and the Terra d'Otranto (in Apulia). The word terroni was recorded for the first time in 1950 by Bruno Migliorini, as an appendix to Alfredo Panzini's Dizionario moderno ('Modern dictionary') in 1950. Originally only derogatory and racist, over time the term terroni has also acquired a joking meaning among southern Italians themselves.

==== Racism in politics and sports ====
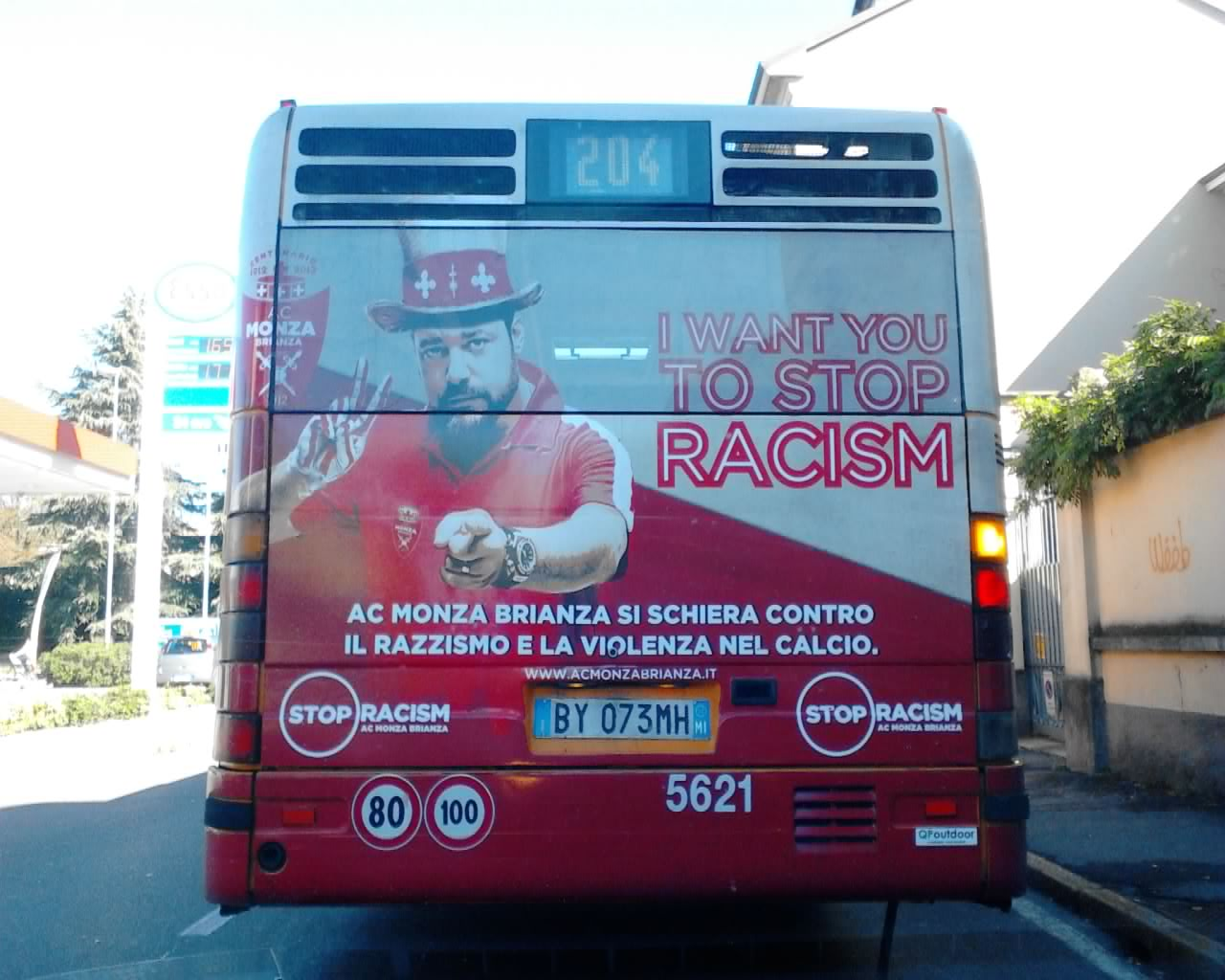
An Italian bus with advertising by the president of AC Monza football team, Anthony Armstrong Emery, against racism in football (2013)

Actions by the Lega Nord have been criticized as xenophobic or racist by several sources. Italians protested the murder of Burkina Faso native, Abdul Salam Guibre, along with racism in Italy on 20 September 2008. L'Osservatore Romano, the semi-official newspaper for the Holy See, indicated that racism played an important role in the riot in Rosarno. According to a Eurobarometer study, Italians had the third lowest level of "comfort with person of Gypsy origin as neighbour", after Austrians and Czechs.

Contemporary Italian football fans, of lower-league and top-flight teams, have been noted by foreign media for racist behaviour.

Following the 2013 nomination of Cécile Kyenge, a Congolese-born Italian immigrant, as Minister of Integration in the government of Enrico Letta, she became subject to several racial slurs by local and national politicians. One of these slurs was made by Roberto Calderoli, a prominent figure of the Lega Nord. He claimed that whenever he saw Minister Kyenge, an orangutan came to his mind. During a speech by Kyenge at a meeting of the Democratic Party a few days after Calderoli's slur, some members of the far-right and neo-fascist New Force threw a clump of bananas at the minister.

Another example is the packages containing a pig's head that were sent to Rome's Synagogue, the Israeli embassy and a museum showing an exhibition on the Holocaust in January 2014.

==== Environmental racism ====
Romani and migrant populations in Italy experience documented practices of racism and segregation within a context of environmental concerns and environmental inequality. Among migrant populations in Italy, environmental inequality has been documented in relation to agricultural labor through exposure to pesticides, low wages, and poor working conditions.

With regards to the Romani presence in Italy, legal scholar Jennifer Illuzzi uses a term called the "state of exception" to argue that liberal Italian legal contexts have historically created scenarios in which "Romanies are under intense scrutiny, but juridically invisible". Illuzzi argues that as a result of the "state of exception", contemporary Romani communities in Italy become easily subjected to criminalization, denial of citizenship or national status, and social exclusion, notably in places such as government-implemented Nomad Camps.

In Italy today, many Romani settlements (including Nomad Camps) exist within segregated contexts where both environmental concerns (such as lack of clean water access, toxic waste exposure, and proximity to highways and industrial areas) and issues of criminalization are present. In Campania, Romani residents have been involved in the mass burning of waste and have been housed in extreme proximity to a hazardous waste site that has been likened by one government official to Chernobyl in terms of cleanup requirements and risk to human health.

===== Nomad Camps and related sites =====
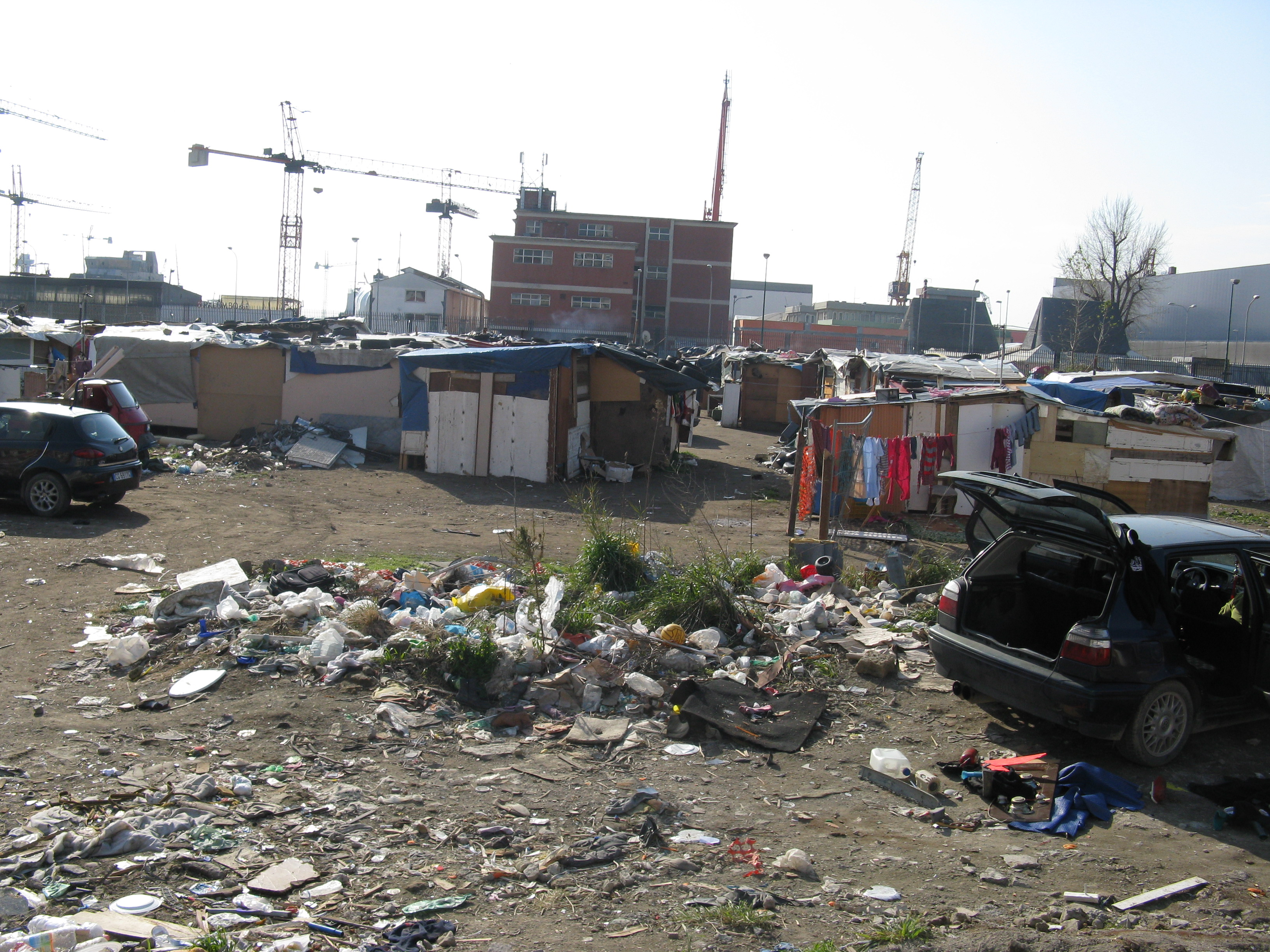
Romani camp, Naples, 2012, situated next to the harbour

In Rome, over 4,000 Romani persons (not to be confused with Romans) live in encampments authorized by the Italian national and Roman municipal governments. As of 2013, 40,000 Romani persons were living in camps throughout Italy. In response to the Italian government's alleged "Nomad Emergency" in 2008 during which a law was passed stating that Romani communities were causing a "situation of grave social alarm, with possible repercussions for the local population in terms of public order and security", an emergency "Nomad Plan" was devised by the municipal government of Rome. The European Commission also granted legal passage for the Italian government to move forward with plans to systematically fingerprint Romani communities.

Under the "Nomad Emergency" decree, special funds were allocated by the government to close informal Romani settlements and encampments in Rome, and to resettle a maximum of 6,000 Romani persons into 13 authorized camps. According to Amnesty International, "The decree was later declared unfounded and unlawful by the Council of State in November 2011 and by the Supreme Court in April 2013." By 2013, living conditions in these camps had deteriorated severely due to overcrowding and a lack of utilities and other basic infrastructure. As of 2010, six of the camps were located far from residential areas, situated outside Rome's Grande Raccordo Anulare, the city's orbital highway. As of 2013, one camp, Castel Romano, was inaccessible by public transportation, and was located along a notably dangerous motorway, the Via Pontina. Another camp, Nuovo Barbuta, was situated between a railroad, Rome's orbital highway, and the runway of Ciampino airport. As of 2013, due to a lack of public transportation, residents of the Nuovo Barbuto camp had to walk long distances along an unpaved shoulder of a busy road in order to leave the camp; furthermore, they were subject to air and noise pollution from the nearby airport.

In 2015, 378 residents, most of whom were Romani, were documented residing at the Ex Cartiera housing shelter under extremely substandard, cramped, and unhygienic conditions. Prior to its closure in 2016, it was cited by the European Roma Rights Centre for being located in an isolated area of a heavy industrial district known as via Salaria 971, located in immediate proximity to both a municipal solid waste treatment facility and a high-volume highway.

In Milan, the Social Emergency Shelter (SES) housed predominantly Romani residents in via Lombroso 99 district until 2016, located in an "old industrial area, alongside a busy railway track". Families housed in the facility lived in shipping containers, with 16 to 27 persons residing in each container. In 2010 another authorized settlement, Triboniano Camp, was "squeezed between a railway track, cemetery, and container storage" in an industrial area of Milan.

===== Hazardous waste in Campania and exposure to Romani settlements =====
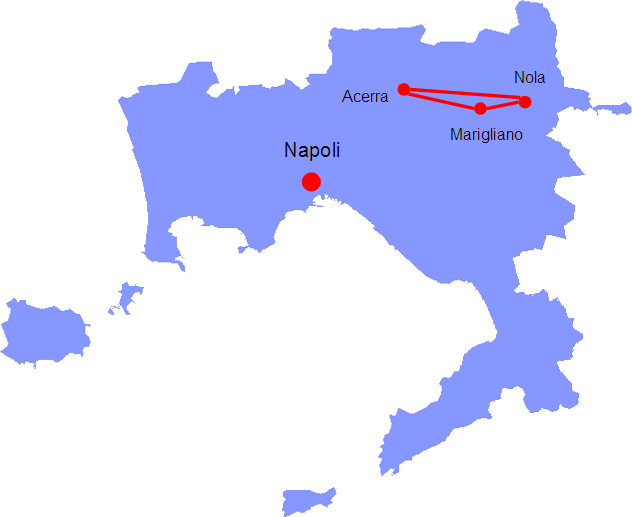
Map of the Triangle of Death

In Italy, an estimated 11.6 million tons of waste are illegally disposed of each year. According to ex-Camorra member Carmine Schiavone, millions of tons of waste from factories in northern Italy have been illegally disposed of in the region north of Naples for decades, allegedly with Mafia and Camorra involvement and the complicity of government authorities and police. In 2004, the area surrounding Acerra was labeled by British medical journal The Lancet Oncology as a "triangle of death" where the incidence of two-headed sheep has been recorded.

According to Italian environmental organization Legambiente, in 2012 the total financial value of the illegal garbage industry in Italy was estimated at over 16 billion euros. Over the course of testimony delivered to a secret parliamentary investigative committee in Rome on October 7, 1997 (made public in 2013), Schiavone alleged that nuclear waste from East Germany was also secretly transported to the region, along with other wastes containing dioxin, asbestos, and tetrachloroethylene. Campania has since shifted from being a dumping destination and is now a transit point for the export of hazardous waste to China, and, according to Gen. Sergio Costa, commander of the Naples region for Italy's environmental police, the Balkans and Eastern Europe.

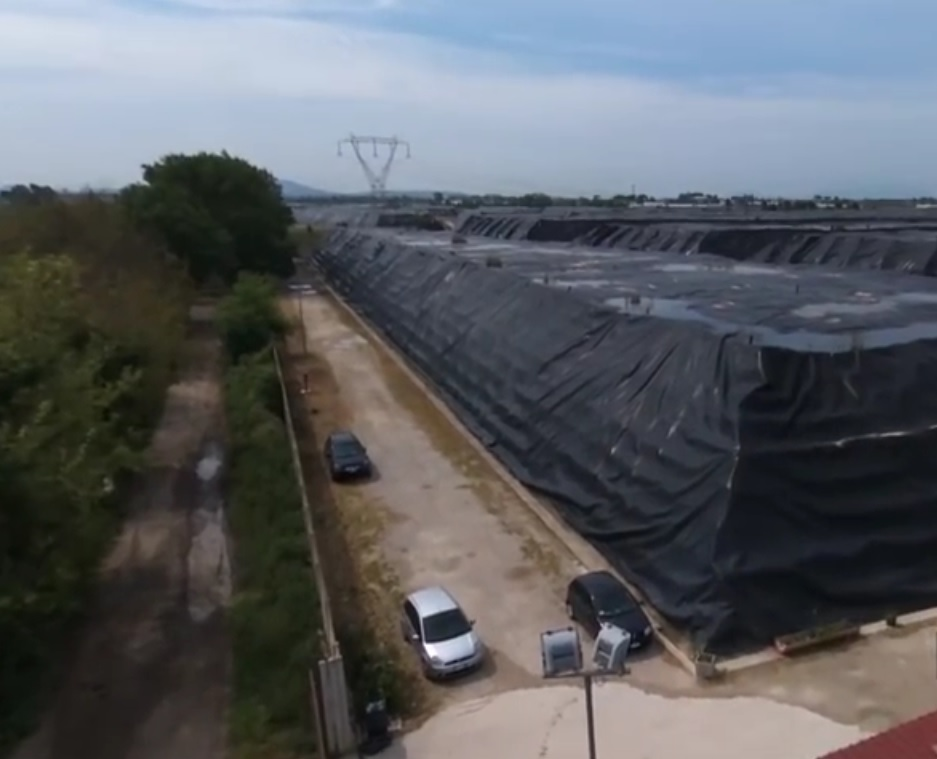
Taverna del Re hazardous waste facility, Giugliano

As of 2014, 5,281 contaminated sites and suspected waste dumps have been located by American military investigators. Meanwhile, the region's 500,000 inhabitants have been disproportionately affected by medical ailments; according to Antonio Merfella of the Italian Cancer Research Institute in Naples, the region of Campania has the highest rate of infertility in Italy; in the province of Naples, lung cancer among non-smokers is increasing, while tumors in general have increased 47 percent among males. The region has also become known for disproportionate cases of autism. Concerns over the safety of food production in the fertile agricultural region (much of which is still believed to be uncontaminated) persist.

Many of the most seriously affected people in the region are Romani residents from settlements near Giugliano and the greater Naples area which have been subjected to extreme exposure of pollution and toxic waste. According to Los Angeles Times journalist Tracy Wilkinson, Romani boys in 2008 were hired throughout the region by the Camorra to set fires to piles of waste, creating significant quantities of toxic smoke over vast swathes of land.

One of the contaminated Romani camps in Giugliano was unofficial, populated by 500 persons most of whom were migrants from the former Yugoslavia. Built in 1991 and home to 85 families, it was documented in 2010 as a series of camps located "northwest of Naples, at the outer limits of the urban centre, on the external ring-road following the State Highway 162", surrounded by industrial lands. Originally situated on open farmland, the so-called "spontaneous"-status unauthorized settlement became surrounded by industries and disposal sites that were later owned by the Government of Campania, which developed a 24-hour surveillance and barricade system surrounding the camp, contracted to the private security firm Falko Security S.R.I.S. According to Raffaella Inglese in Mapping the Invisible, environmental justice concerns for residents in 2010 entailed

noise pollution produced by the neighbouring factories, air pollution from the same factories and [an] ex-centre for refuse collection; pollution from the burnt refuse; the danger of the roads being very near their homes and the areas in which their children play; the dirt and run-off from the illegal dumping of toxic industrial waste in the immediate vicinity and the necessity to wash themselves outside which is dangerous for children.

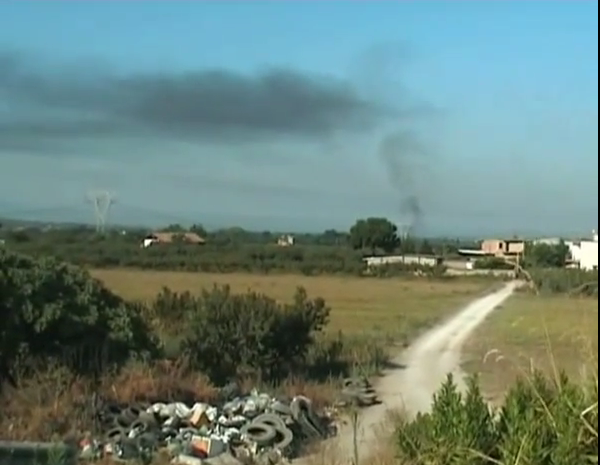
Fire burning near Giugliano, probably due to illegal waste incineration

Another environmentally toxic camp, Masseria del Pozzo, was also located in the Giugliano region. This camp, established in March 2013, was an official settlement forcibly created following the eviction of other camps in the Giugliano region, including a previous site that was contaminated by hazardous waste. The Masseria del Pozzo camp was home to approximately 260 persons in March 2016. In 2014, the population of the camp was estimated to be 500 persons, with approximately 200–400 children, according to various residents. According to the European Roma Rights Centre, the community had resided at various camps within the Naples region for the past 25 years and "almost all of the [former] inhabitants of the camp are residing lawfully in Italy; they generally have permanent resident status in Italy and some are Italian citizens".

The settlement was located next to the Masseria del Pozzo toxic waste dump where persistent issues of hazardous biogas leaks from the landfill caused severe health concerns, and was also surrounded by at least three other hazardous landfill sites such as Resit and Novambiente, as well as lands contaminated by illegal toxic sludge disposal. In the words of Der Spiegel journalist Walter Mayr, "500 Roma live in shacks and caravans at the foot of what is probably Europe's nastiest landfill, stuffed with, among other things, toxic sludge and dioxin. It is a place where, in the opinion of the responsible government commissioner, a 'sarcophagus like in Chernobyl' would be necessary to protect the public."

Residents of the former settlement reported mysterious deaths and disabilities among children and youths, as well as pneumonia and other sicknesses among children. According to former camp resident Giuliano Seferovic, authorities originally informed residents that they would only be placed at the location for a month; this promised timeframe extended to two months, and then nearly a year by the time of the interview. In a video interview with Mario De Biase, Government Commissioner for Reclaims (Land Reclamation), De Biase discusses the issue of toxic gases:

Surely these landfills are perhaps the most dangerous for their potential environmental disaster and effects not only on the environment but directly on human health ... They are all gases coming from the landfill. They transmigrate through the permeability of the soil and arrive into this pit where they find their way to come out in the air. One cannot say that a child who lives 24 hours a day between the smoke of the mineralization of VOC [volatile organic compounds] of the well, who lives and plays on soils contaminated by hazardous waste, who crosses the road for 5 meters and ends up on a landfill where there are all the fumes of biogas and leachate, obviously I do not think that is good for the child, neither for adults.

In the words of former resident Rashid Osmanic, interviewed while living in the camp,

With biogas here we all die, no guns, no weapons, nothing! So we die. Two or three years here, and we all die, children get diseases.

Following the announcement of the planned closure of the settlement, Romani rights organizations such as Associazione 21 luglio and the European Roma Rights Centre condemned plans to forcibly relocate the community to a new segregated camp, with Associazione 21 luglio expressing particular concern over the potential creation of a larger segregated "mega-camp" where further social marginalization could take place. On June 21, 2016, the entire camp was forcibly evicted without written notice and relocated to a new camp in an industrial area near Giugliano. The new site is located at a former fireworks factory, which was destroyed in a 2015 explosion. According to human rights observers, the secluded site, which is surrounded by wild vegetation on three sides and a wall, is contaminated with what appears to be asbestos and unidentified potentially explosive substances, and is littered with sharp objects that pose a danger to children. Residents were not given any say in selecting a new site, and faced homelessness if they did not move to the new camp, which does not have any housing, sewerage, electricity, or adequate water supply. As of February 2016, the Ministry of Interior and Region Campania have secured funding for a new permanent, segregated replacement site with 44 prefabricated dwellings. No funding has been committed for integration measures such as education, health, employment, or community programs, prompting the European Roma Rights Centre to describe the plan as "a long term plan for segregation".

===== Migrant agricultural workers =====
In both southern and northern Italy, large numbers of migrant workers from Africa and Asia produce agricultural goods within a context of severe social and environmental marginalization, lacking access to clean water, utilities, housing, and wage security while facing exposure to harsh working conditions and harmful pesticides. As of 2015, the Italian Association for Legal Studies on Immigration (ASGI) estimated that there were probably close to 500,000 regular and irregular foreign agricultural workers in Italy, of whom 100,000 were believed to be at risk of severe marginalization with regards to living conditions and social mobility.

According to a report by Amnesty International, there is "a causal link between labour exploitation of migrant workers and the measures adopted by the Italian government with the stated view of controlling and regulating migration flows". The report focused on the Latina and the Caserta areas where large numbers of workers are of Indian (mostly Punjabi) and African origin respectively, the latter of whom are mostly from Burkina Faso, Ghana, Nigeria, Algeria, Egypt, Morocco, and Tunisia. In Calabria, immigrant fruit pickers for the orange juice industry have been identified as subject to notably exploitative social conditions.

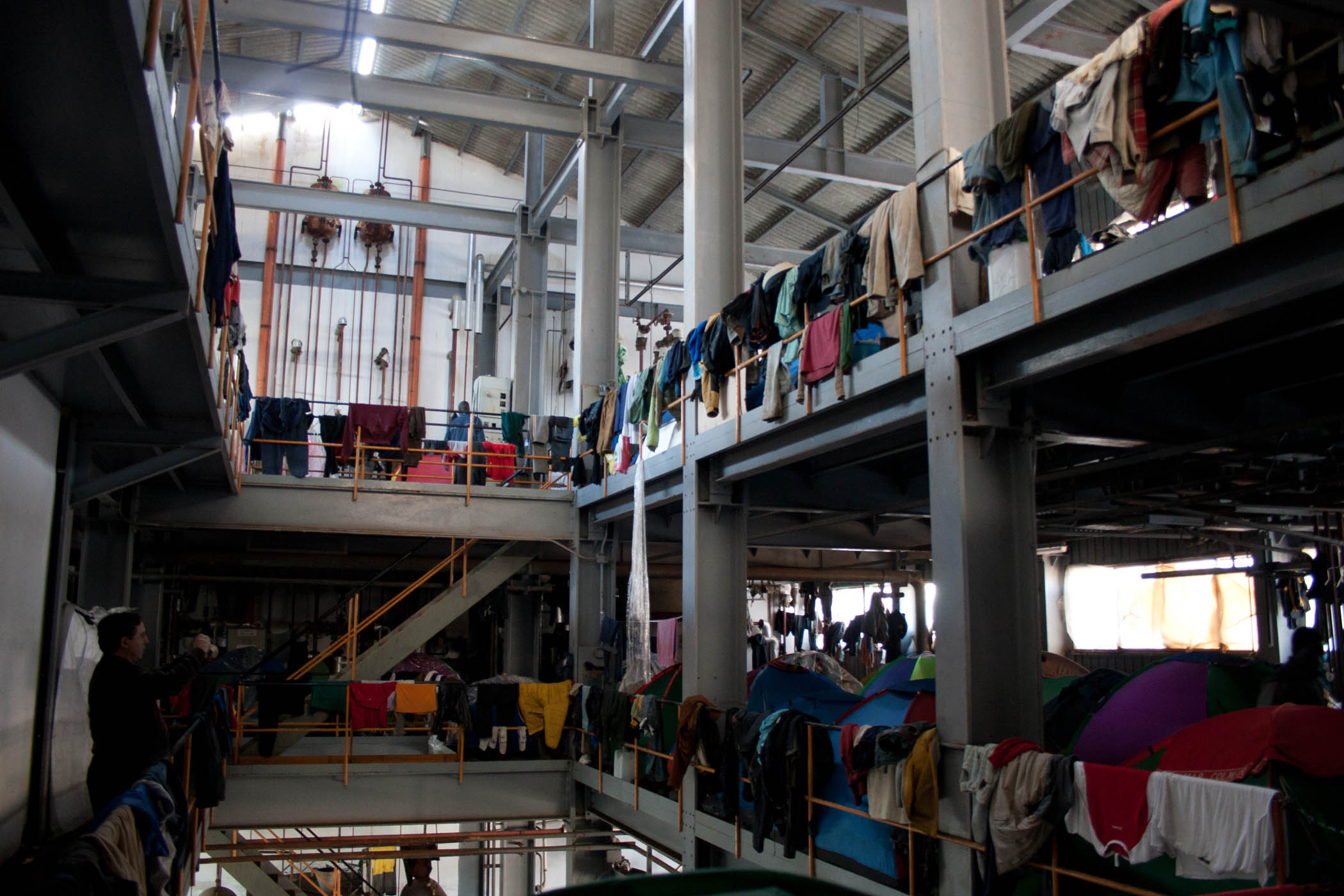
Migrant agricultural worker housing, Rosarno, Italy

While some migrant agricultural workers are paid well and welcomed as economic contributors for helping fill jobs that established Italians are often reluctant to perform, the average wage in Italy for migrant agricultural workers is only 33 dollars a day. In the Latina area alone, 61% of agricultural employers were found by Italian regulatory inspectors to be in contravention of social security and employment laws. In Caserta, migrant agricultural workers partake in the tomato, fruit, dairy, watermelon, and orange industries, often under exploitative or substandard employment conditions. In particular, the fast-growing and lucrative Italian tomato industry, which sources 60 percent of processed tomatoes consumed in the UK and half the entire European Union supply, producing a total export value of 1.5 billion Euros in 2014, has been identified as a significant source of workplace abuse. While 70% of Italy's tomato production is generated from the areas of Apulia and Emilia Romagna, severe abuses of tomato pickers have been documented throughout Italy, including most provinces.

On January 7, 2010, there was an outbreak of violence in the citrus-producing town of Rosarno, Calabria in the aftermath of a drive-by shooting that targeted two migrants. Following the shooting, hundreds of migrants marched through the town to protest their living conditions, an event that ultimately led to confrontations with riot police and the torching of vehicles. According to Amnesty International, "The clashes were followed by a "migrant manhunt" carried out by some local residents. In a number of separate incidents during the following days, two migrants were reportedly beaten with iron bars, five deliberately run over by a car and a further two injured by shot-gun pellets. In total, 53 persons were hospitalised, including 21 migrants, 14 local residents and 18 police officers." Following the incident, a mass detention of migrants remaining in Rosarno ensued. In the words of one worker from Ghana,

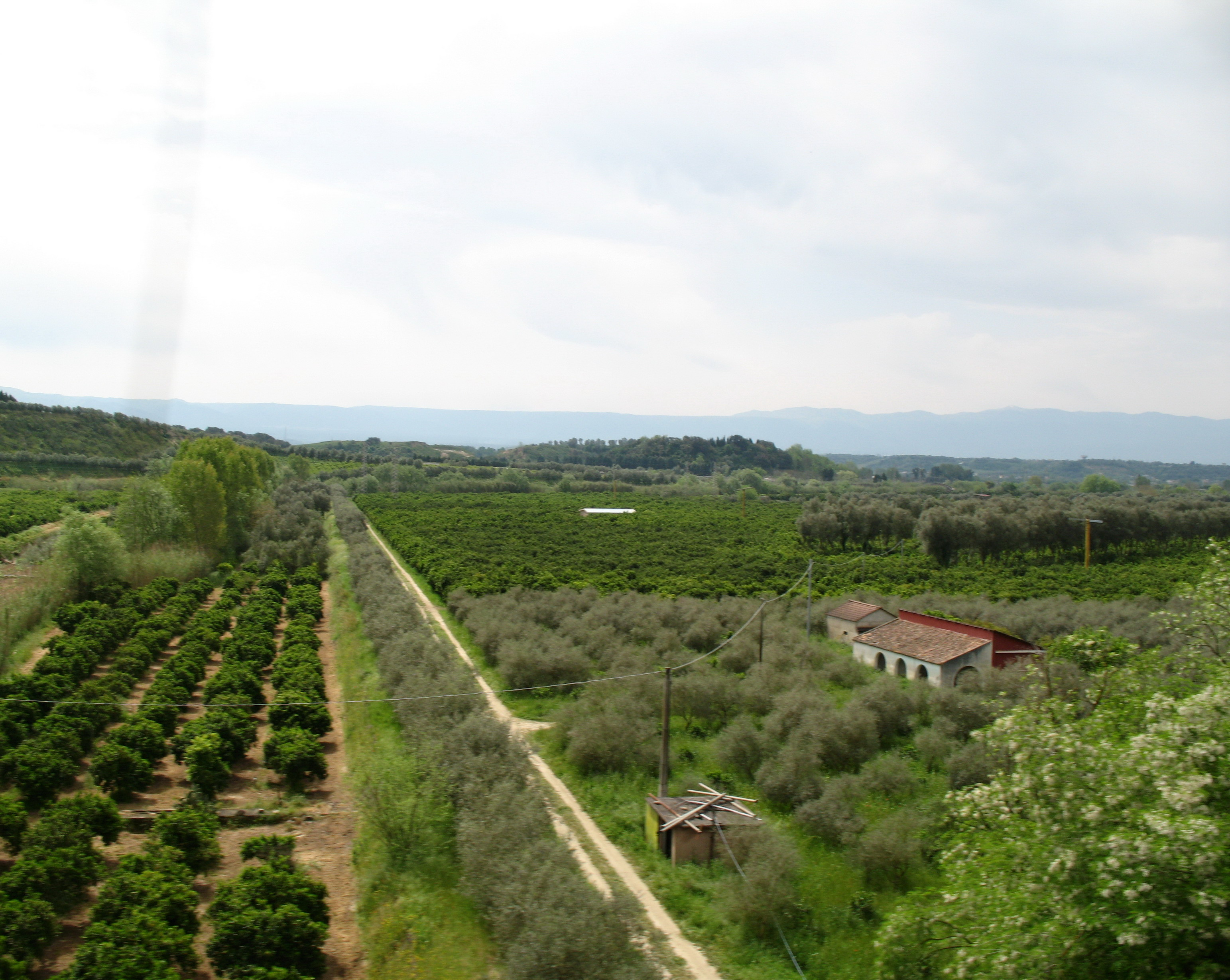
Citrus orchards near Rosarno, where anti-immigrant violence and clashes occurred January 2010

In Rosarno we were working from morning to night, picking oranges, for 25 euros a day; but we had to pay 5 euros for transport, so we had only 20 euros left. There were some abandoned factories where one would build a shelter with some cardboard – one was called the Ghana ghetto. That day [i.e. the day of the clashes, 7/8 January 2010] we decided to go and buy something in town. Some boys were shot by Italians. We decided to do a demonstration about that, because that was not the first time. That's where all the problems started. There were fights between blacks and whites. But we did not want to fight the Italians; we wanted to go to the Comune [the local administration]. No Italian would pick oranges for 25 euros.

A major issue for migrant workers in the Rosarno citrus industry are health concerns stemming from exposure to chemicals such as pesticides. According to healthcare worker Dr. Luca Corso of the outreach medical organization Emergency, which assists immigrants who are frequently denied access to Italian hospitals, many workers have shown signs of ailments caused by working in orchards where tree spraying is active. In the words of Dr. Corso,

We've started to see, particularly since the beginning of January, some cases that can be linked to working activities; mainly the improper use of pesticides and fungicides used during this season. It's mostly cases of irritative phenomenon, for example contact dermatitis in exposed areas (hands and face) or conjunctivitis...because the eyes are exposed.

According to Nino Quaranta, founder of agricultural rights advocacy group SosRosarno, an underlying issue for low wages is the economic challenge confronting many smaller-scale farmers. Most are small independent operators who are often unable to recover costs due to the current price of oranges, which has been affected by international competition and a price crash, thereby compelling them to seek the cheapest labor possible. Contributing to this pressure, market monopolization has been identified by local agriculture advocates as an aggravating factor. According to Pietro Molinaro of the Calabrian Organisation of Producers, "The problem this area has faced for some years is that the big multinational drinks companies underpay for the juice. They put pressure on the small local processing plants that press the juice."
