= Yellow-bellied turtle (disambiguation) =

Yellow-bellied can refer to several turtle species:

- Yellow-bellied slider
- Yellow-bellied mud turtle
- Red-eared slider × yellow-bellied slider

== See also ==
- Yellowbelly (disambiguation)
