= Bonackers =

American regional nickname

Bonackers is the name for a group of people from the East Hampton Town area of East Hampton, New York.

== History ==
The name traditionally refers to the working class families who live in an area called Springs (never, in local parlance, "the Springs") in the north of East Hampton, New York, though for several decades it has been used to refer to residents of East Hampton as a whole. Many of the original Bonac families in Springs were among the very early settlers of the town having come from England, possibly Kent or Dorchester, Dorset, in the 17th and 18th centuries.

The family names associated for generations with the term "Bonacker" include Fithian, Miller, King, Bennett, Conklin, Strong, Havens, and Lester. The term Bonacker comes from Accabonac Harbor, which in turn derives its name from Montaukett/Algonquian languages term for "root place," or "place of ground nuts" (in most interpretations referring to potatoes).

For three hundred years, Bonackers made their living as baymen, fishermen, and farmers. Clams and clamming were at the heart of Bonac culture and cuisine. Bonac specialties include clam pie, clam fritters, oysters, clam chowder (traditionally, never made with milk, but with tomatoes), bluefish, porgies, blowfish, eel, and blue crabs. The "bay" referred to in relation to a Bonac bayman was Gardiner's Bay, the shoal bay just east of Springs (now often mistakenly called Napeague Bay, a body of water actually to the north and east of Gardiner's). Some Bonac men sometimes also worked at the old Smith Meal plant in Promised Land on Gardiner's Bay, manning boats fishing for menhaden. Gardiner's Bay was the Bonackers' back yard.

In addition to clams, scallops were once also central to Bonac cuisine, but following a die-off in the 1980s, the scallop stocks never recovered.

During the Great Depression, Springs was disproportionately hit due to their isolation, and the residents of Springs continued fishing and farming to survive. Until the late 20th century, Springs was an isolated hamlet, without bus service, train service, or even many automobiles. As late as the 1940s, children walked an average of ten miles to attend high school in the village on Newtown Lane (current site of East Hampton Middle School). Springs had a very tight-knit community; the Presbyterian Church was an important gathering place.

The local Bonac dialect has, in recent times, almost died out completely, it was held strong into the middle of the last century. Today, the Bonac accent is in the process of being lost to the New York City speech patterns of the western portion of Long Island. The Bonac accent is said to be akin to the spoken language of the working class settlers who came from England in the 17th century; and it is also, remarkably, said to be akin to accents of fishing cultures farther down the Atlantic coast, in the Carolinas, for instance, where similar groups of Englishmen settled around the same time. In Bonac, the word "pie," to give one example, was rendered as "poy." (As in, famously: "Boy goy that's good poy.") Archaic English words survived in Bonac dialect into the 20th century, such as the word "Wickus" for rascal. There are only a handful of Bonac speakers left.

Bonackers often also proudly refer to themselves as "bubs" or "bubbies," as in the trademark phrase: "Yes, yes, bub!" A Bonacker wasn't a Bonacker, a bubby wasn't a bubby, unless he had a pickup truck with a Labrador retriever riding in the back. Besides clamming and fishing, Bonackers also trademark local waterfowl and deer hunting, which is a huge part of the true Bonacker lifestyle.

In the 20th and now 21st century, nearly all Bonackers were forced out of their traditional livelihoods and found work in support industries for wealthy vacationers and weekenders on the East End of Long Island. The Bonacker culture has been assaulted by rocketing housing prices on the South Fork—now known worldwide as part of the resort area called, by non-locals, "the Hamptons"—and by troubles in the fishing stocks (troubles both environmental and economic, as well as resulting from controversial Federal government regulation of fishing).

Bonac culture was eulogized in the 1979 book "The South Fork" by Everett Rattray, the longtime editor of the local paper, The East Hampton Star. And, in the early 1980s, the heiress Adelaide de Menil Carpenter—who later donated several historic buildings to serve as the new Town Hall complex in the Village of East Hampton—conducted several hours of interviews on the culture; those tapes now can be found in the East Hampton Library.

The East Hampton High School sports teams are called The Bonackers.

Currently, the East Hampton Historical Farm Museum is a museum dedicated to preserving and presenting the Bonacker lifestyle, and hosts a number of events throughout the year.

== Popular culture ==
- Amagansett, by Mark Mills, a bestselling novel featuring a fictionalized version of the Edwards family, an old fishing and whaling clan from Amagansett (home to sub-sets of some Bonac clans, including the "Posy" Lesters)
- Downeaster "Alexa" by Billy Joel - 1988 which has the lyrics:

I was a bayman like my father was before
Can't make a living as a bayman anymore
There ain't much future for a man who works the sea
But there ain't no island left for islanders like me

- The Great Bonacker Whisky War: An Entertainment by Ralph Maloney

Boston: Little Brown, (1967.) Described as fast, funny amorous and exciting, this novel, set during Prohibition in the 1920s, is the story of a young man who kept his boat in gas by a little amateur bootlegging--until the professionals moved in. The author supported himself for much of his career as a bartender, and he states that he got a lot of his material for his books from this career. 212 pp.

- Salt Water People, by Jake Rosenberg, a play that spins the legend of Chris King, a 17th Generation Bayman struggling with the pressures of losing his wife, his home, his boat, and his source of income, set against the backdrop of Hurricane Sandy in 2012.

Among the phrases attributed to Bonac culture (in addition to those mentioned above):

- How be ya, bub? - Used as a greeting.
- East Coast Clam Clan - A tight knit syndicate of Clammers. Like a secret society, never publicly speaking of their daily catch to others, and have a strict and true regiment. Their main catch is the hard shell clam but often stray away (based on seasons) and collect oysters, mussels, and/or scallops. They have been known to "rape land" in a few hours with very large clams rakes.
- b'low the bridge - A reference that they must travel north below a Long Island Rail Road trestle in order to reach Springs from East Hampton Village
- from away - Anybody coming from outside of East Hampton (a phrase common throughout East Hampton)
- Upisland - Anywhere west of the Shinnecock Canal. Still used frequently.
- Clam the tide out - one of the last to leave a party or meeting
- I wouldn't get inside 10 clam rakes of you - I wouldn't touch you—or that—with a 10-foot pole.
- Catty-Wumper - when something is out of kilter or whack
- "upstreet" versus "downstreet"—until the late-20th century, this was a common geographic locator in the town of East Hampton, as well as an implied class distinction. Traditionally, to go "Upstreet" meant south along Main Street, in the direction of the business district; To go "Downstreet" meant to travel North along Main Street, to the "other side of the tracks," so to speak.
- Yes yes bub - A saying used to agree with another.
- A couple two tree - Used to explain an amount of anything.
- Finest Kind - The best of the best! also a Commercial Fishing boat located at Commercial Dock
- 'Em Guys in Green - NYS DEC
- Dodge City - Sag Harbor
- Sharpie - Home made wooden boat, flat bottom anywhere from 14 to 20 ft give or take.

== See also ==
- List of regional nicknames
