= Copthorne, West Sussex =

Village in West Sussex, England

Coordinates: 51.1391°N 0.1181°W

Copthorne
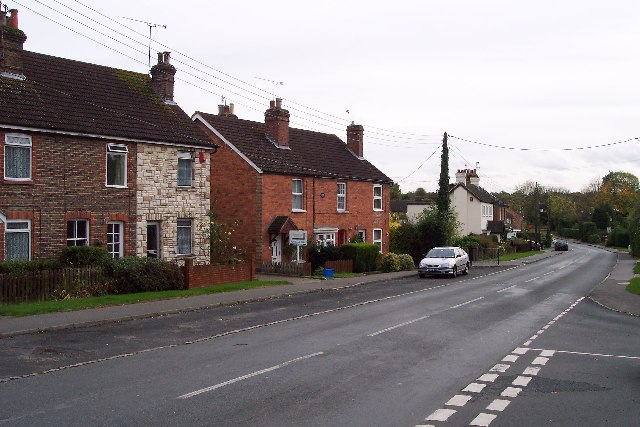
- The main road through Copthorne

- Location within West Sussex
- Population: Approx. 5,000
- OS grid reference: TQ317394
- Civil parish: Worth
- District: Mid Sussex
- Shire county: West Sussex
- Region: South East
- Country: England
- Sovereign state: United Kingdom
- Post town: Crawley
- Postcode district: RH10
- Dialling code: 01342
- Police: Sussex
- Fire: West Sussex
- Ambulance: South East Coast
- UK Parliament: Horsham

Copthorne is a village in the Mid Sussex district of West Sussex, England. It lies close to Gatwick Airport, 25.5 miles (41 km) south of London, 21.5 miles (35 km) north of Brighton, and 36 miles (58 km) northeast of the county town of Chichester. Nearby towns include Crawley to the southwest and East Grinstead to the east. It is the most northerly ecclesiastical parish in the Diocese of Chichester in the Church of England, and together with Crawley Down makes up the civil parish of Worth.

== Etymology ==
The place-name Copthorne is derived from the Old English coppede + þorn, meaning capped or pollarded thorn tree. (A pollarded tree is one which has had its topmost branches pruned back in order to produce a close head of young shoots.) The name was first recorded as Coppethorne in 1437.

== History ==
Lying on the borders between the counties West Sussex and Surrey, has contributed to Copthorne's history. There are stories of smugglers from the south coast stashing their goods in the woods around the village, conscious that it was easy to step across the county boundary, and escape any pursuing constabulary. Evidence of smugglers tunnels and stash holes have also been found under properties near the church and the now closed Hunters Moon Inn on Copthorne Bank.

Boxing prize fights took place on Copthorne Common in the early 19th century. The English championship was held in 1810, between Tom Cribb of Bristol and Tom Molineaux from Virginia, United States.

A Copthorner is traditionally known as a Yellowbelly, and there are a number of stories told as to why this might be. Some talk of villagers wearing their gold strapped around their bellies, but the most likely reason is probably tied to the traditional local trade of charcoal burning, where some of those working stripped to the waist found their skin turned yellow with the smoke. Another possibility has it that the smugglers had to crawl through the mud to avoid detection and thus acquiring muddy yellow bellies.

As part of a village Millennium project, a history of the village Copthorne – The Story So Far was published by the community in 1999/2000.

== St. John the Evangelist Church ==
The church is at the centre of Copthorne village and is surrounded by a historic church yard. The Lych Gate at the entrance of the church serves also as an official War Memorial listing the local names of those that were enrolled during the First World War. It was erected in 1897 and originally given to the parish as a well-cover for the village well, located on the green opposite the Junior School. It was moved to the Eastern entrance of the church yard to prevent it from falling into disrepair.

The Church is a mid-Victorian church which was built in the 1870s as a gift of Lady Jane Lampson and her husband, Sir Curtis Lampson, Baronet, of Rowfant. Prior to that Copthorne had largely been part of the ancient Anglo-Saxon parish of Worth. Sir Curtis was an American living in this country while laying the first trans-Atlantic communication cable. The Kelly's Directory of Kent, Sussex & Surrey of 1881 records that in those days the church cost £3,500 to build. The interior brickwork consists of the Early English style of red and white bricks, some distinctive decorative black bricks and a number of stained-glass windows presented by several members of the Lampson family. Inside the church there are items such as the main altar, which is carved out of solid oak, war memorial tablets and the little carillon with two chromatic octaves.
