= Tuckahoes and Cohees =

Groups of people in colonial-era Southern United States

In the Colony of Virginia, Anglican planters of eastern Virginia were called Tuckahoes, to differentiate them from Cohees (Note: also spelled Coohee, Kohee, Quohee.)—German and Scotch-Irish immigrants that settled in the Shenandoah Valley, west of the Blue Ridge Mountains in what is now Western Virginia and West Virginia. The Cohees were the first Europeans to settle in what are now Amherst County and Nelson County, Virginia.

Tuckahoes were considered to be "of the Lowland old Virginians". A particular Tuckahoe culture was created when Algonquin-speaking Native Americans, English, other Europeans, and West Africans in the Colony of Virginia brought customs and traditions from each of their home countries and the "loosely-knit customs began to crystallize into what later became known as Tuckahoe culture". It began to develop in James River plantations and spread throughout the Tidewater and then other areas of Virginia.

Cohee was a name that Scotch-Irish and German immigrants to the colonial-era Southern United States gave themselves. The word comes from the Scots and Ulster Scots phrase "quo he", which corresponds to "quoth he" in standard English. It has come to mean "a backwoods settler of Scots or northern Irish origin". The term Cohee was also used in Pennsylvania.

The creation of West Virginia marked the end of the "Cohee-Tuckahoe binary", with many Cohees migrating west.

== See also ==
- American ancestry
- List of regional nicknames
- Shenandoah Germans
- Yankee
