= Terrone =

Epithet of the Italian language

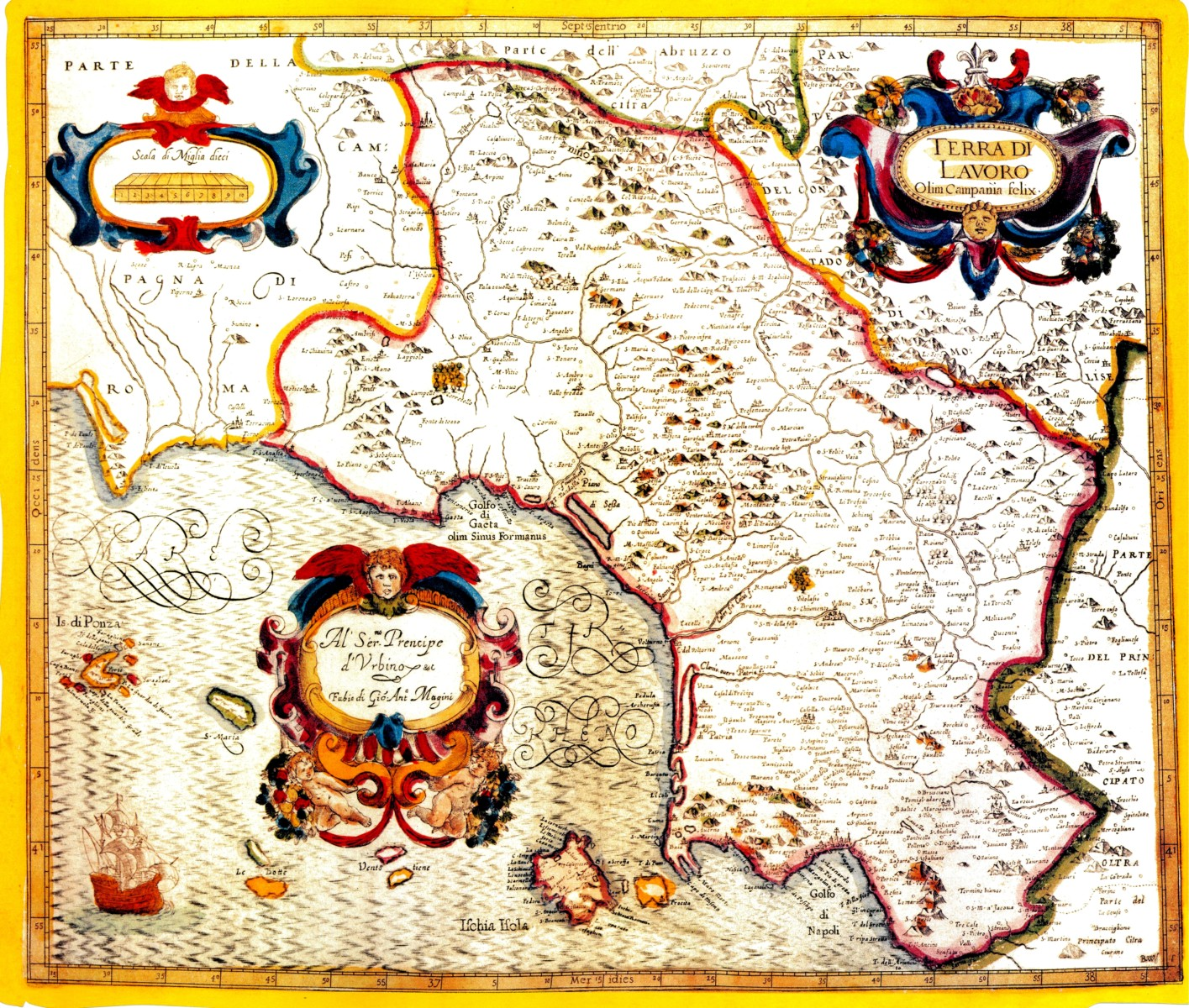
The Terra di Lavoro in the 18th century, included in the so-called Campania Felix.

Terrone (Italian pronunciation: [terˈroːne]; plural terroni, feminine terrona) (Note: In some Northern Italian languages: Piedmontese: taron, feminine taron-a [taˈrʊŋ(a)]; Ligurian: te(r)rón, feminine te(r)rónn-a [teˈɾuŋ(ːa)]; Lombard: te(r)ron [teˈrũː], feminine te(r)rònna [teˈrɔna], or terù, feminine terùna [teˈru(na)]; Venetian: teron [teˈɾoŋ], feminine terona [teˈɾona]) is an epithet of the Italian language with which the inhabitants of Northern and Central Italy depreciatively indicate the inhabitants of Southern Italy.

The term certainly originates from the word terra (Italian for "land"), with developments that are not always clear, and was perhaps linked in the past by the denominations of southern areas such as the Terra di Lavoro (in Campania) or the Terra di Bari and the Terra d'Otranto (in Apulia).

The word was recorded for the first time in 1950 by Bruno Migliorini, as an appendix to Alfredo Panzini's Dizionario moderno ("Modern Dictionary") in 1950. Ultimately, it is a derogatory and racist term meaning "people from the dirt".

== Etymology ==
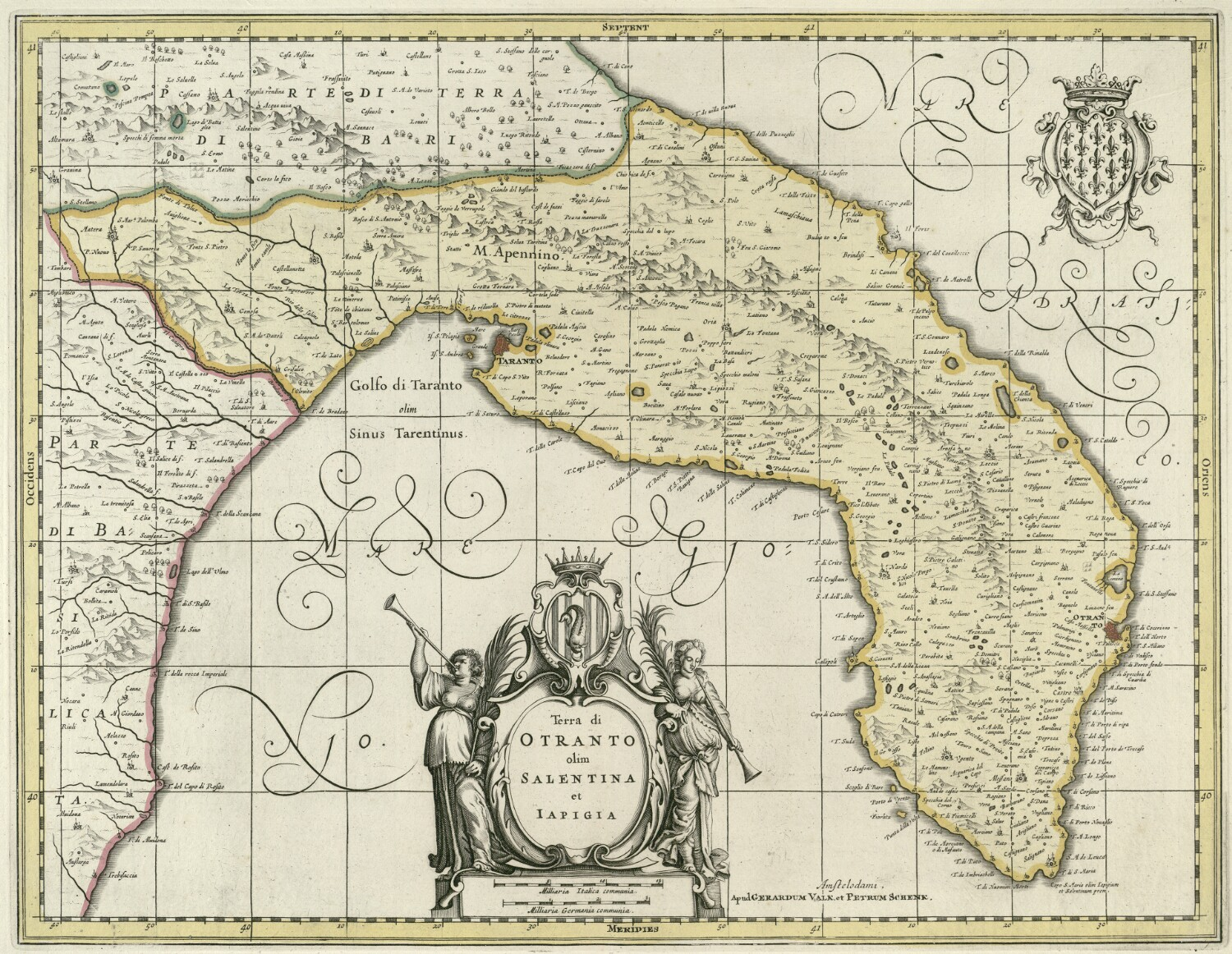
Terra d'Otranto on an ancient map

According to the Grande dizionario della lingua italiana ("Great Dictionary of the Italian Language" GDLI), the term terrone derives from terra (Italian for "land"), with the suffix -one. The Dizionario etimologico della lingua italiana ("Etymological Dictionary of the Italian Language, DELI) defines it as a toponymy referring to the Terra di Lavoro, the Ancient Campania (Campania Felix), a vast area of agricultural work in the Kingdom of Naples and subsequently in the Kingdom of the Two Sicilies, or to the other "lands" (term which designated some provinces) of the Kingdom of Naples, such as the Terra di Bari or the Terra di Otranto.

The reference to the land is also variously explained by the GDLI as "land eater", "person with dark skin colour, similar to the land" or "originating from lands subject to earthquakes". The term may have originated as a syncrasis of terre[moto] and [meridi]one ("person from a land [such as Southern Italy] prone to earthquakes").

== History ==
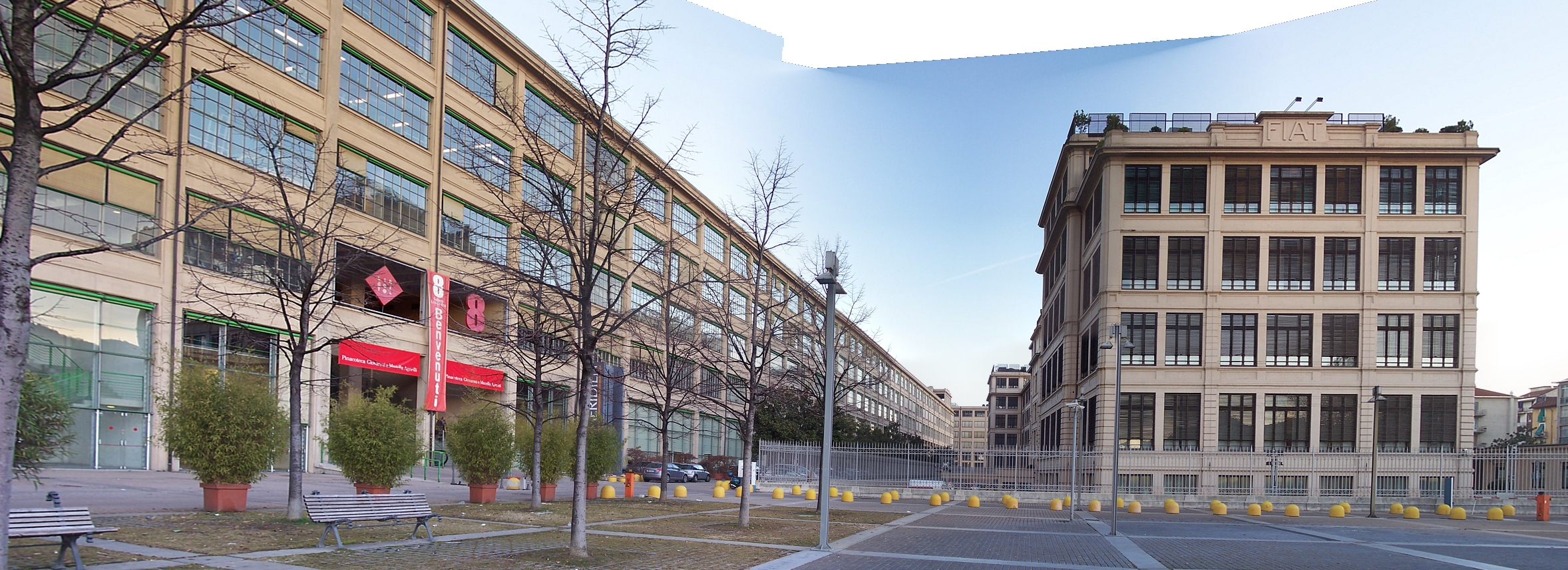
The former FIAT plant of the Lingotto in Turin, where many Italians emigrated from Southern Italy to work

Until the 1950s, terrone kept the classist meaning of "peasant", that is "person working the land (hence the word terra)". At one point, even people migrating from the relatively more rural regions of Veneto, Emilia-Romagna and Tuscany to the industrialised Lombardy had been accordingly nicknamed terroni del nord ("Northern Terroni").

From the 20th century onwards, the term terrone began to be used in Northern Italy to refer to those originally from Southern Italy, with particular reference to emigrants looking for work.

However, it was not until the Italian economic miracle, when a great number of Southerners migrated to the industrial centers of Northern Italy, that it spread in large urban centers and in the countryside of Northern Italy with often highly derogatory and insulting connotations, and is similar to other words of the Italian language designating farm workers (villano, contadino, zotico, burino and cafone). The term terrone has now extended to include the Tuscans themselves in the language of the inhabitants of the northern regions of Tuscany.

== Terrone as an insult ==
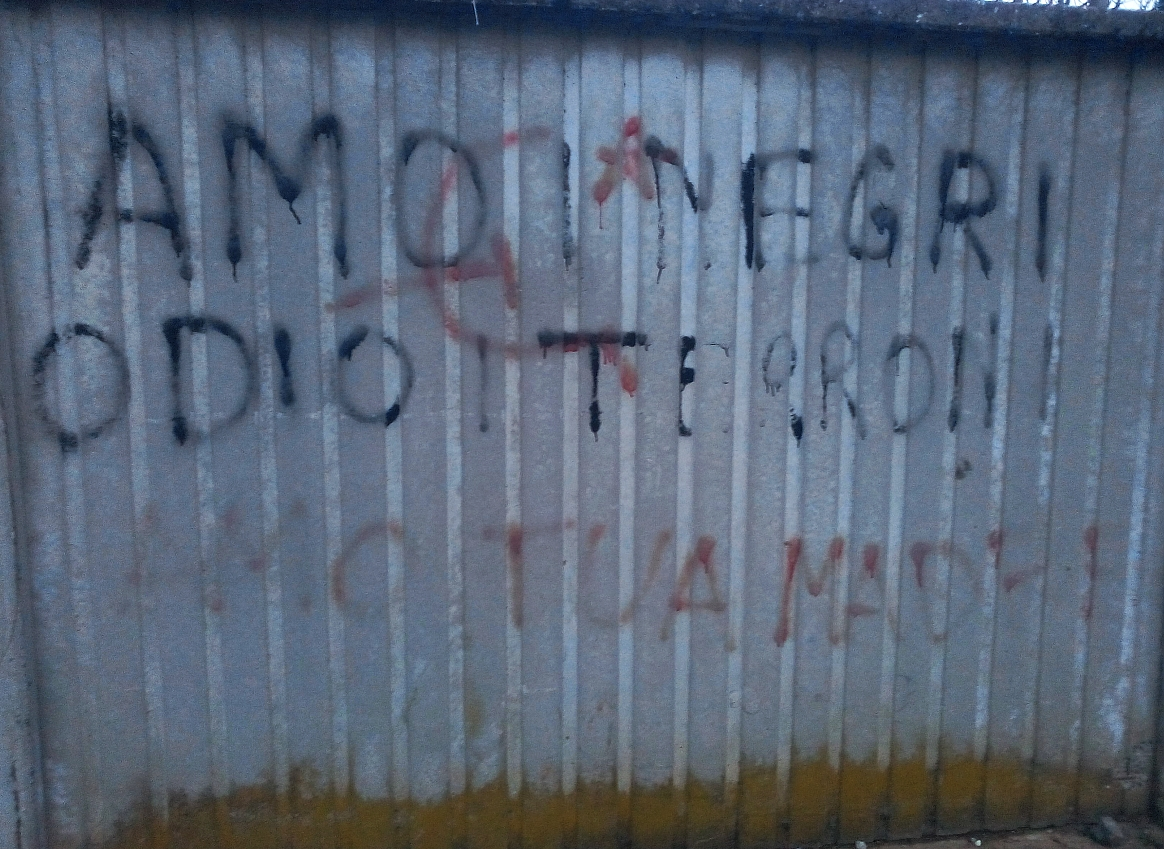
Racist graffiti in Caselette (Piedmont) saying amo i negri, odio i terroni ("I love negroes, I hate terroni")

The use of the word terrone as an insult, and not as an ethnographic term, is historically a source of misunderstanding due to the fact that the population of the northern part of the Italian peninsula uses it with offensive intentions.

In a 2005 court case, the Supreme Court of Cassation upheld a ruling by the Savona justice of the peace, which recognized the discriminatory intent of a person who used the term to define another person, ordering the former to compensate the offended party for moral damages.

Although the term remains largely perceived as derogatory and racist, it has also undergone a re-evaluation and a joking use of identity by some southern Italians, especially among those who emigrated to the North.

== Derivatives ==
The word terrone would have generated the endearment form of terroncino, the diminutive form of terroncello and, finally, the derogatory form of terronaccio. Bruno Migliorini in Parole e storia documents that already during World War II, "in Trento Terronia was even coined to indicate Southern Italy, the main supplier of bureaucrats and policemen". The adjective terronico was coined to indicate "what concerns southerners". Terronese was coined to indicate the southern variety of Italian language.

== Stereotypes and extensions ==
Negative personal characteristics are often associated with the epithet terrone, including ignorance, lack of desire to work, contempt for certain hygiene and above all civic rules. Similarly, especially in some slang meanings, the term has increasingly taken on the meaning of "rough person" or without taste in clothing, inelegant and tacky, with unsophisticated and rude manners, remaining an insult aimed at clear discriminatory intentions.

== In popular culture ==
The term terrone is often used in cabaret, mainly by actors and comedians such as Giorgio Porcaro and Diego Abatantuono, the latter playing the terroncello. It is also frequently used by the comic trio of Aldo, Giovanni and Giacomo, in scenes in which Giovanni and Giacomo make fun of Aldo by calling him terrone in an ironic and joking way, as Aldo has Sicilian origins.

== See also ==
- Racism in Italy
- Italy's North-South economic divide
- Polentone

== Bibliography ==
- Russo Bullaro, Grace (2010). From Terrone to Extracomunitario: Shifting Demographics and Changing Images in a Multi-cultural Globalized Society. Leicester: Troubador Publishing. ISBN 9781848761766.
