= Polentone =

Epithet of the Italian language

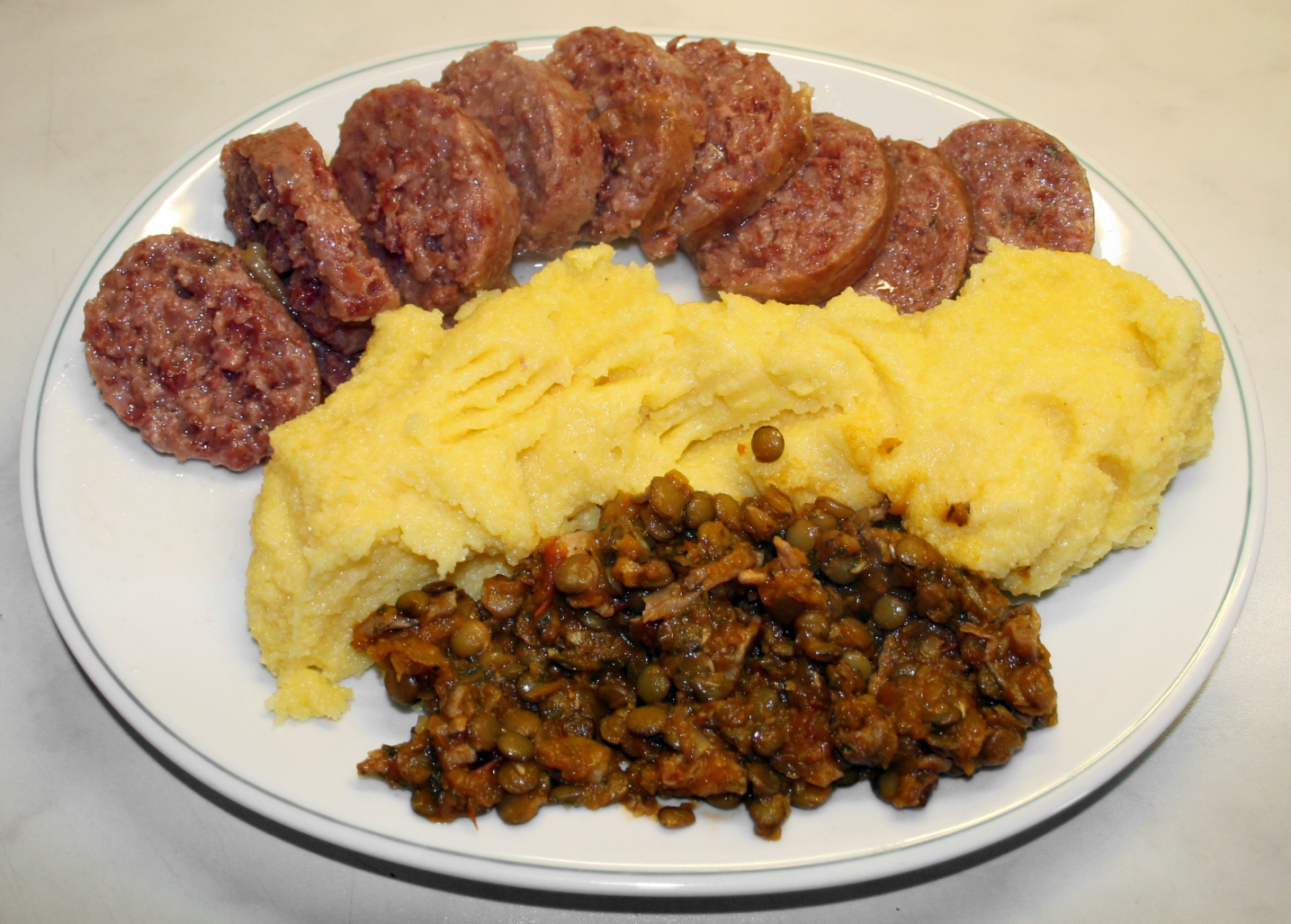
Polenta porridge with lentils (bottom) and cotechino sausage (top)

Polentone (Italian pronunciation: [polenˈtone]; plural polentoni, feminine polentona) is an epithet of the Italian language originally coined with a joking connotation to indicate a great polenta eater and, subsequently, used by Southern Italians to describe Northern Italians in a depreciative sense.

== Origin and meaning ==
The first known attestation of the term dates back to 1798, in the form polendone in a short story by Domenico Batacchi, with the meaning of a slow and lazy person with awkwardness and awkward movements; in this sense it is an ancient Tuscan popular term.

With the meaning of "polenta eater", the word was recorded by Bruno Migliorini in 1942 during World War II with the clarification that the term, which had long been widespread among soldiers, then spread to all classes, due to post-war hardships. The term was therefore inserted in the parochial dialectic between inhabitants of the north and south of the Italian Peninsula, being used in opposition to the terrone appellative, which instead is aimed at southern Italians. Both words have anti-ethnic connotations aimed at pointing out an alleged ethnic and cultural inferiority, even if often used only in a joking way.

Polenta is historically a very common food in the poor cuisine of Northern Italy. In fact, until the early years of the 20th century, polenta was the staple food of the populations of northern Italy (namely Lombardy, Veneto and Piedmont). For the poorest classes, it could have negative consequences on the health of many subjects who were often victims of pellagra, even if it saved them from many food shortages. Polentone, as a linguistic stereotype, has therefore taken on a derogatory meaning in southern Italy, and indicates a boorish person.

== See also ==
- Racism in Italy
- Italy's North-South economic divide
- Terrone
