= Accabonac Harbor =

Harbor in Long Island, New York, US

- Location within New York
- Location: East Hampton, New York
- Coordinates: 41°1′41″N 72°8′24″W
- Ocean/sea sources: Atlantic Ocean
- Basin countries: United States

Accabonac Harbor is a natural harbor in East Hampton, New York, near the Eastern end of Long Island, New York. The harbor is shallow and is a coastal wetland that is preserved and therefore is a winter habitat for waterfowl. It is listed as a state-level Important Bird Area.
