= Yellowbelly (Copthorne) =

A Yellowbelly is a native-born resident of Copthorne, West Sussex, England. The origin of this nickname is uncertain, but a number of explanations have been offered. These include:

- The men of Copthorne used to smelt iron and make charcoal in the woods around the village, stripped to the waist, and their bellies turned yellow in the smoke;
- Copthorne Rovers, a local association football club, was known as the Yellow Bellies, and the nickname was then applied to the whole community;
- Bellies became yellow while crawling through fields of buttercups to poach game;
- In a local iron quarry, the men became covered in yellow dust;
- The gypsies on the common placed a gold sovereign on the belly buttons of their new-born children;
- The early Saxons living in this area used yellow ochre, found in the local clay, to colour the walls of their homes;
- An outsider wishing to marry a Copthorne girl had to cross their prospective bride's belly with gold sovereigns;
- The old villagers wore gold strapped to their bellies
- A scurrilous story was spread by the residents of the neighbouring village of Crawley Down about urination habits in Copthorne; and
- Local smugglers would run away if they thought they were likely to be caught.

The Crooked Brook Beer Company Limited, a brewery in Copthorne, was known until 2014 as the Yellowbelly Brewery.

== See also ==
- Yellowbelly (Lincolnshire)
