= Terra di Bari =

Coat of arms

The Terra di Bari (Italian for "land of Bari"), in antiquity Peucetia and in the Middle Ages Ager Barianus (Latin for "field of Bari"), is the region around Bari in Apulia. Historically it was one of the justiciarships of the Kingdom of Sicily and later Naples. It became a province in the Two Sicilies. Today it is a part of the Province of Bari in Italy. Since 2005, according to the municipal government of Bari, it refers to the metropolitan area of the city and is trademarked for touristic purposes.

To the north of the Terra is the Capitanate and to the south the Terra d'Otranto. It is the only plain between the Murgia and the Adriatic and comprises the littoral, centred on Bari, between the river Ofanto and the city of Fasano.

The ancient name "Peucetia" is derived from its ancient inhabitants, the Peuceti.
