= Yellowbelly (Lincolnshire) =

Nickname for a person from Lincolnshire, England

A yellowbelly (or yeller belly) is a person from Lincolnshire, England. The origin of this nickname is disputed, and many explanations have been offered. These include:

- The uniforms of the old Lincolnshire Regiment were green with yellow facings. The fastenings of the uniform tunic, which were known as frogs, were also yellow.
- A species of newt, frog or eel (there is disagreement on this point) found in the Lincolnshire Fens had yellow undersides.
- Bacon hung up and stored for a long time turned yellow (reasty).
- The backs of farm workers who stripped to the waist in hot weather turned dark brown but their bellies turned yellow.
- Opium extracted from poppy heads, and taken to relieve malaria that was prevalent in the fens in earlier centuries, turned the skin a shade of yellow.
- Sheep grazing in mustard fields were dusted by pollen from the blossom that turned their undersides yellow.
- Women traders on street markets in past times are reputed to have worn a leather apron with two pockets, one for copper and silver and one for gold. At the end of a good day they would say they had 'a yellow belly' meaning they had taken a large number of gold sovereigns.
- A folk etymology says that the term originated from Elloe, the name of the rural deanery that serves the fen area of the Lincoln Diocese. This in turn took its name from the Saxon Wapentake which was referred to as þe Elloe Bellie - Elloe meaning out of the morass while bel was the Celtic word for hole or hollow.
- Yellow is the colour of cowardice. Some say that it comes from the fact that a large number of the male population of Lincolnshire stayed behind to work the farms whilst others went to war in France.
- A fictional explanation for the nickname appears in Stephen Wheeler's historical mystery novel *Knight's Honour* (2020), which is set during the Battle of Lincoln in 1217. In the novel, Brother Walter states that Lincoln green was produced from blue woad and yellow weld, adding: "Originally Lincolnites used just the weld which gave rise to their other sobriquet, 'yellowbellies'."

== See also ==
- Yellowbelly (Copthorne)
