= Das Verbrechen als soziale Erscheinung; Grundzüge der Kriminal-Sociologie =

1884 book by Enrico Ferri

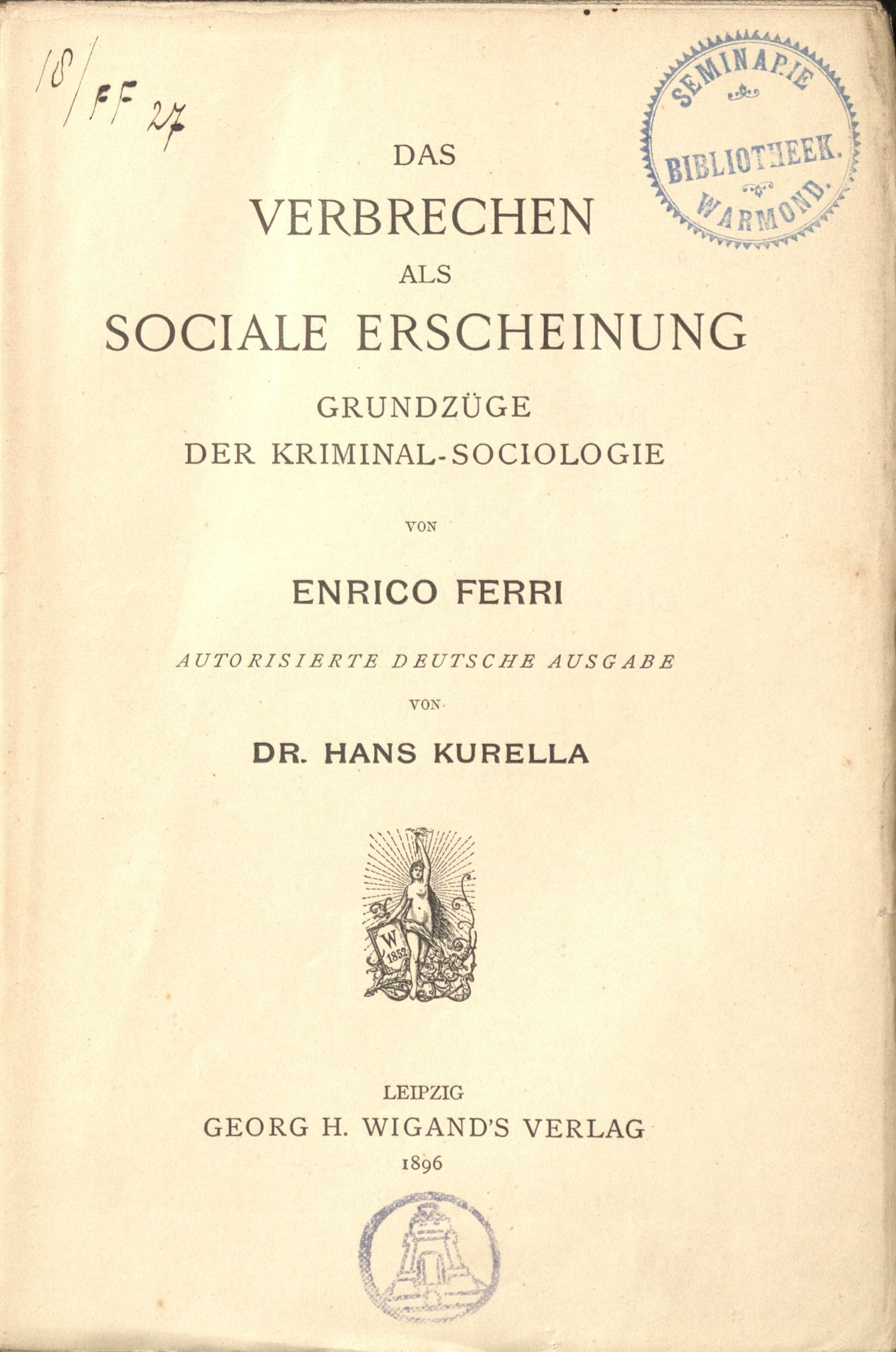
Title page of the book

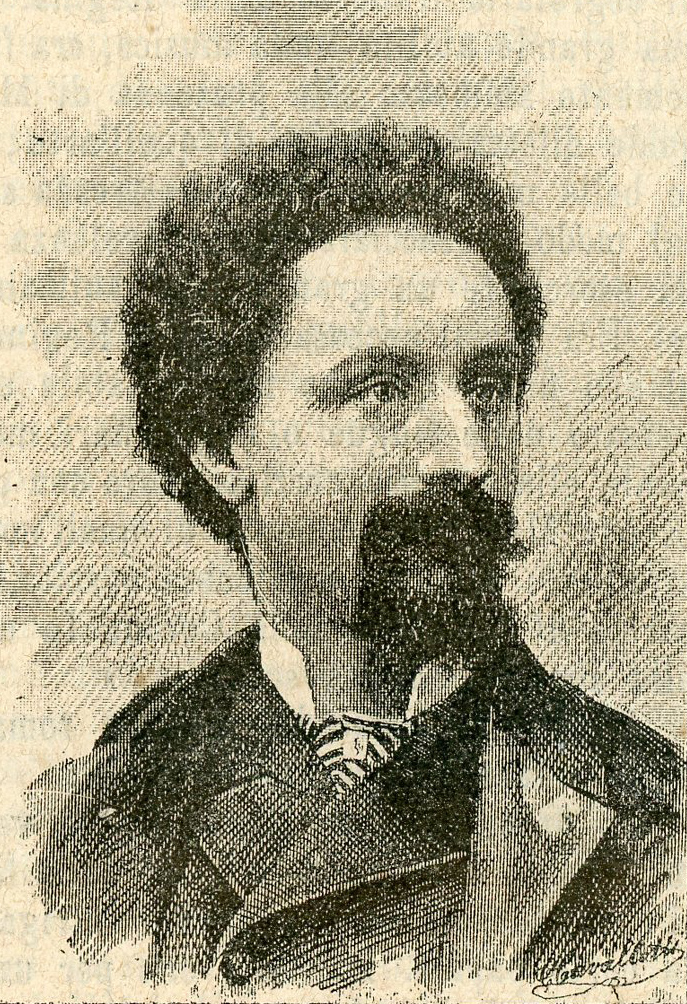
Enrico Ferri

Das Verbrechen als soziale Erscheinung; Grundzüge der Kriminal-Sociologie (translated to English: Crime as a Social Phenomenon; Outlines of Criminal Sociology) was written by Enrico Ferri and originally published in 1884, but has undergone several revisions since then. It deals with Ferri's perspective on criminal sociology and problems of penology. The book is known as Ferri's most important work and represents the positive school of criminology.

== Context ==
Ferri worked at University of Turin while being a student of Cesare Lombroso and later also becoming Lombroso's friend as well as son-in-law. Lombroso was the one who established the field of criminal anthropology shortly after 1870. Following in the footsteps of Lombroso, Ferri used the studies that complimented and served as evidence of the advancements made in the study of crime and punishment via the work of Cesare Beccaria to apply them in the sociological and legal fields for his work Criminal Sociology.

Pietro Ellero, prior to resigning from his position in Bologna after being named a Supreme Court justice, voiced his desire for Ferri to be named as his replacement. Three years after earning his degree, Ferri returned to his alma mater to teach criminal law. His first lecture, on "the new horizons in criminal law and prosecure," was given in December 1880. One of the attendees said it was one of those occasions "that are epochal in academic history." Criminal Sociology, his best-known work, was inspired by this lecture.

While previously only crime itself had been studied, in Criminal Sociology Ferri was one of the first to focus on the criminal as a product of his physical and social environment to defend society through direct and indirect methods of prevention and repression. This science had to overcome the many preconceptions of the old world. Ferri was well-aware of the heated debate that has developed around his master Lombroso's writings. Ferri's book was motivated by Lombroso's opponents, who caused him to be enraged due to their intellectual incapacity to comprehend Lombroso's theories and their cruel attitude towards the positive school. As a result, his book is more as a "discours de combat" than a scientific discussion, as the literature critic Burnetiere states. However, Ferri avoided endorsing extreme opinions in his work due to the intense controversy surrounding Lombroso's writing. Due to the criminological discourse that was occurring at the time of the book's publication and the fact that criminology was still in its infancy, Ferri's impassioned and compelling presentation of his ideology quickly received relevance in criminology.

Ferri's work Criminal Sociology was regarded by William Healy, a British-American psychiatrist and criminologist, to be epoch-making because it combined Lombroso's anthropological research with his own work in criminal statistics and criminal law, leading to the establishment of a new school of positive criminal law in Italy, of which Ferri is the leading exponent. In his writing, Ferri covers a wide range of topics with distinction, drawing on a wide variety of data and demonstrating knowledge with the perspectives of other authors. In Criminal Sociology Ferri positions his own viewpoint in relation to that of other authors and discusses the competing theoretical schools of criminology.

== Contents ==
The book deals with the practical applications of criminality and includes three parts. The first part is concerned with criminal anthropology and is an explanation of different categories of criminals as well as the psychology of criminals. This first part is a review of Lombroso's work and focusses on the physical characteristics of criminals. The second part of the book deals with criminal statistics and investigates which social environments are likely to increase criminal behavior in specific parts of the population. Ferri also points out that punishment can only act on individuals committing crime due to physical reasons and therefore, doubts the usefulness of punishment. In this part of the book Ferri also states that the amount of crime against property has increased much more compared to the crime against person, which he relates back to the numerous new laws that have been made. The author divides society in to three different classes depending on the amount of crime an individual commits. In the third part practical reforms for penal legislation and prisons are outlined. Ferri suggests that judges should be well trained in sociality, biology and psychology. According to Ferri judges should determine the guilt or innocence of the accused and if guilty the classification of the criminal. The classification of whether a criminal is insane or born as a criminal should then decide on which institution the individual should be sent to as Ferri suggests different institutions for different categories of criminals.

The book's core message is that the ultimate cause for committing crime is an individual's moral sense. Religion, love, honor, and loyalty do not encourage criminal behavior because they are too complex to affect moral judgment. According to Ferri, criminal science requires a new approach that shifts away from theological and ethical perspectives and toward physical and social science. This science had to overcome a number of traditional prejudices. Criminal psychology is described in Ferri's book as having "defective resistance to criminal urges and temptations, due to that ill-balanced impulsiveness which characterizes children and savages."

== Reception ==
Ferri's book Criminal Sociology is known as his most pioneering contribution to the study of crime causation, criminal classification, the purpose of criminal penalties, the treatment of offenders, and legal system reform. Criminal Sociology is worldwide acknowledged as an essential part of the modern science of criminology and has been positively reviewed by many literary critics and criminologists as for example J.P. Lichtenberger and W. Bailey. J.P. Lichtenberger, who reviewed Ferri's work for the Annals of the American Academy of Political and Social Science, claims that among the translations made by the American Institute of Criminal Law and Criminology, Criminal Sociology is the best contribution to American criminology literature to date. He states that by translating this book, the American Institute of criminology has done a major service to English civilization. Especially Ferri's claim in his book that the goal of criminal justice is societal defense, as well as his recommendation of alternative punishments as the best method of crime prevention were highly relevant for American criminology. Lichtenberger points out that although Caesare Lombroso's significant work in the field of criminal anthropology established the basis, the current author's work should receive the majority of the credit for creating the positive or Italian school of criminology.

Criminal Sociology was also reviewed in the American Political Science Review by W. Bailey in 1917, who claims that the book provides one of the most accurate portraits of the transformations that criminal sociology has seen over the past 50 years. Ferri's book is acknowledged by W. Bailey and M.V. Ball in the American Political Science Review and the Annals of the American Academy of Political and Social Science for its significant contribution to modern penology as the book teaches that each criminal should be examined in light of his or her surroundings, background, and any peculiar circumstances surrounding the act. Few criminologists before Ferri gave anthropological factors the same weight as the author does in his work and tended to give social variables a lot more weight. While the author firmly believes that anthropological elements have relevance, his continued emphasis throughout the book on physical, telluric, and social factors makes the author's interpretations of crime comprehensive and logical, as stated by Lichtenberger. M.V. Ball, who also reviewed Criminal Sociology for the Annals of the American Academy of Political and Social Science, claims Ferri's practical proposals for reforms made in Criminal Sociology to be not especially novel, but that the author's arguments for his suggestions and the considerable thought he provides to the social factors that contribute to crime stand in stark contrast to writers who have only one particular treatment for every illness that affects everyone. Ball points out that the book unites the work of Italian anthropologists.

According to W.D. Morrison's review for Mind, the aim of Ferri's book to serve as an introduction to the biological and sociological study of crime could be successfully fulfilled. As Beccaria and Howard's beliefs were disproved, there was a need to examine criminal phenomena methodically and using experimental techniques. According to Ferri's book, the purpose of these theories was to lessen the severity of punishments and improve the rights of those who had been convicted of crimes. In line with these theories it could be achieved that the management of prisons has changed in every civilized community during the course of the 20th century, and the harshness of the penal code has diminished. These changes meant important progress in criminal justice becoming more in line with people's basic human rights.

Healy criticizes about Ferri's work Criminal Sociology that he writes about material that is almost entirely derived from the Latin races, and while he freely acknowledges the importance of studying the mind in criminology, his information on mental life is simpler than what is revealed by contemporary psychological research. Ferri's constant claim that he can recognize types in the real world, particularly the murderer type is seen as naive. Also criticized about Ferri's writings in Criminal Sociology are the generalizations he makes from Italian individuals to Americans. It is criticized that America does not resemble Italy at all in terms of the prevalence of stigmata and generalizations should hold true outside of one community.
