= Skull of Giuseppe Villella =

Italian peasant and criminal (1802–1864)

Giuseppe Villella
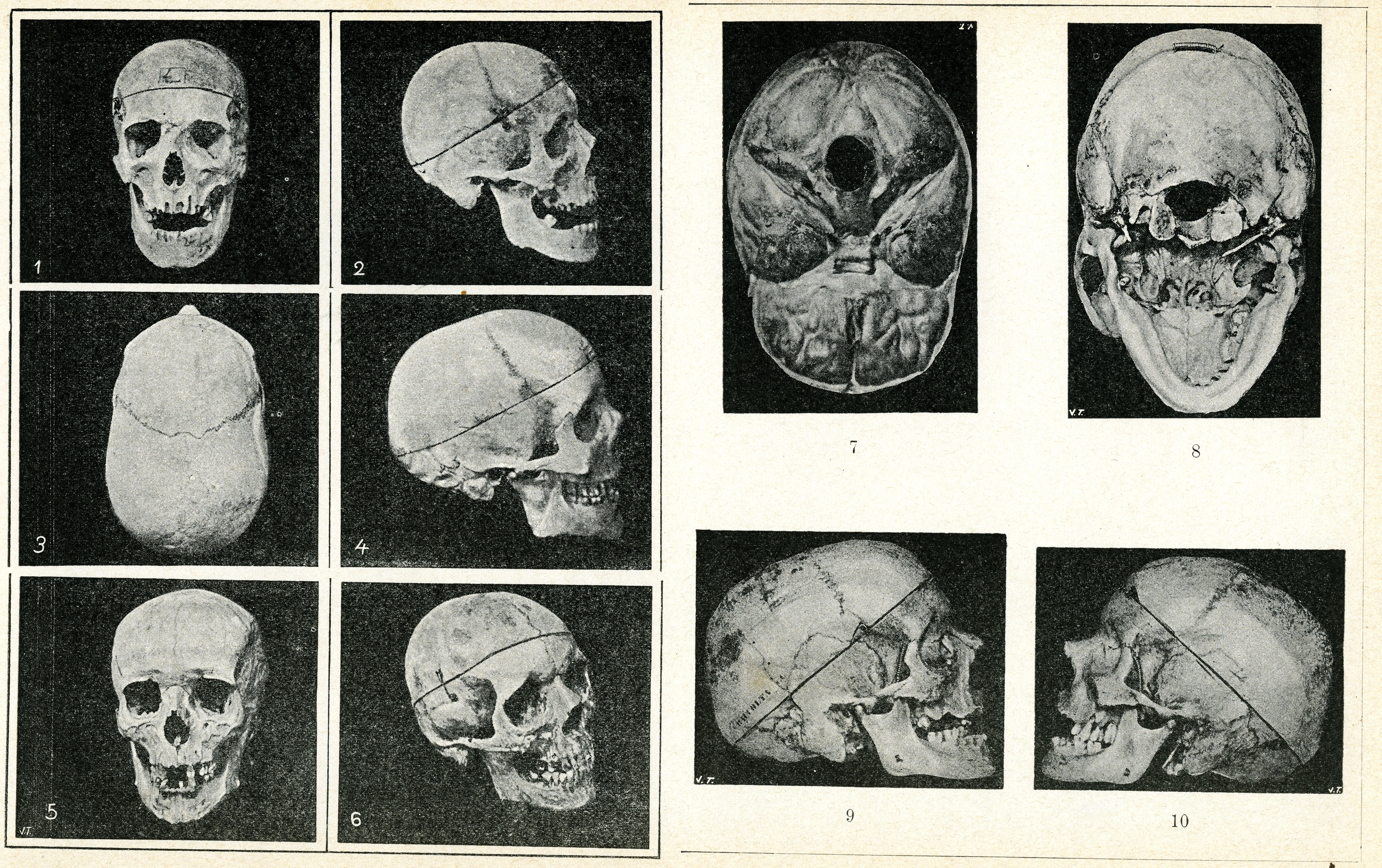
- Pictures taken by Cesare Lombroso depicting the skulls of Italian Brigands. Images 7, 8, 9, and 10 show the skull of Giuseppe Villella.
- Born: May 2, 1802; Motta Santa Lucia, Calabria, Kingdom of Naples
- Died: November 16, 1864 (aged 62); Pavia, Kingdom of Italy
- Criminal charges: Theft, burglary

Giuseppe Villella (May 2, 1802–November 16, 1864) was an Italian peasant born in the Calabrian town of Motta Santa Lucia. After his death, the analysis of Villella's skull by the Italian criminologist Cesare Lombroso led to the discovery of a median occipital dimple—a trait Lombroso claimed was inherited from primates and pointed to criminality being inherently atavistic. Lombroso ultimately credited Villella's skull for spurring an epiphany that led to his development of criminal anthropology.

== Life of Giuseppe Villella ==
Little is known about Villella's life. Until recent archival discoveries revealed biographic information on Villella, all that was known about Villella came from Lombroso. Maria Teresa Milicia, professor of cultural anthropology at the University of Padua, conducted archival research on Villella, uncovering new information about his life and revising previous notions about Villella.

Villella was born on 2 May 1802 in Motta Santa Lucia, Calabria, during the reign of Ferdinand IV of Naples to Pietro and Cecilia Rizzo. His father died in 1810, leaving behind Giuseppe and his six siblings: Rosa, Rosaria, Francesca, Maria, Stefano, and Antonio. Throughout his life, Giuseppe himself fathered five children: Maria Teresa, Nicola, Saveria, Francesca, and Angela Rosa. In historical records, Villella's occupation is listed as pecoraro, a shepherd who manages others' sheep, and bracciale, a day laborer usually employed as a seasonal farmhand.

On the 29th of July, 1843, Giuseppe Villella and an accomplice, Carmine Ajello, went to the farm of Nicola Gigliotti armed with a rifle and robbed the farmers at gunpoint. They took "five ricottas, a wheel of cheese, two loaves of bread, and two kid goats," the value of which did not exceed a single ducat. Villella was eventually found guilty of these crimes, receiving a sentence of six years and an order to pay fines to the court. He was released early in the spring or summer of 1847, as this had marked his first offense, and begat his daughter Francesca in July 1847.

In 1863, at the age of 60, Villella appeared on record again at the Catanzaro Court of Appeals, facing charges of repeated theft, and being caught in flagrante delicto. Villella was the victim of widespread extradition of Southern Italian "brigands" to Northern Italy in the aftermath of the Unification of Italy, where he ended up in a Pavesi prison. On November 16, 1864, Villella succumbed to ulcerative colitis at the Civic Hospital of Pavia.

During his lifetime and immediately after his death, Villella was branded as an insurrectionist and brigand who fought against the Piedmontese effort at unification. Yet modern historical research suggests that, although he was a criminal, he did not engage in any anti-unification efforts. Instead, Villella was a common thief who gained the title of brigand during a period of rampant racism and persecution against Southern Italians.

== Lombroso's analysis ==
In 1864, Villella's body was autopsied by an unknown coroner. Lombroso may have observed the skull sometime after the death of Villella, but he did not record his observations until 1870, nor publish them until 1871. The fact that he did not record his discovery for six years until after Villella's autopsy suggests that Lombroso was cherry-picking evidence to support his hypothesis.

Nevertheless, Lombroso's observations catalyzed his theories in criminal anthropology, which would send shock waves across Europe, and far beyond. Upon noticing what he called a "median occipital dimple," a depression on the occipital bone near the back of the skull where there would usually be a bony ridge, he had an epiphany: to him, this dimple was evidence of a lower stage of evolution, a trait he had seen in animals like lemurs and rodents, but not humans. In the introduction to his most influential work, Criminal Man, he recounts, "At the sight of that [Villella's] skull, I seemed to see all of a sudden lighted up as a vast plain under a flaming sky, the problem of the nature of the criminal." From this observation, he extrapolated that the other features he noticed in criminals, including "the enormous jaws, high cheek-bones, prominent superciliary arches, solitary lines in the palms, extreme size of the orbits, handle-shaped or sessile ears found in criminals, savages, and apes," also indicated an atavistic being.

Throughout Criminal Man, he describes Villella as a senile brigand and criminal who repeatedly avoided capture. In one passage, Lombroso shares a story where a seventy-year-old Villella used a goat head as camouflage to escape into the wilderness of Calabria. Lombroso made various minor references to Villella throughout his works, but his most notable description was the small note he left inside Villella's skull:

Male, age 69—height 1.70m—Black hair, scant beard—a hypocritical thief three times over, the last time sentenced to 7 years in prison. Taciturn and violent by nature; in prison he would steal from his fellow inmates and always deny it. He was transferred from criminal detention suffering from a cough, typhus, and scurvy diarrhea, and died in Ward D of this [Civic] Hospital on August 16, 1864. He had been sentenced for having destroyed a mill and set it on fire, stealing from it.

Lombroso's theories have contributed to the burgeoning positivist school in Italy, exacerbated racism against Southern Italians, and eventually led to the widespread anti-Slavic, anti-African, and antisemitic sentiment in Mussolini's Italy.

== Legal battle for the skull ==
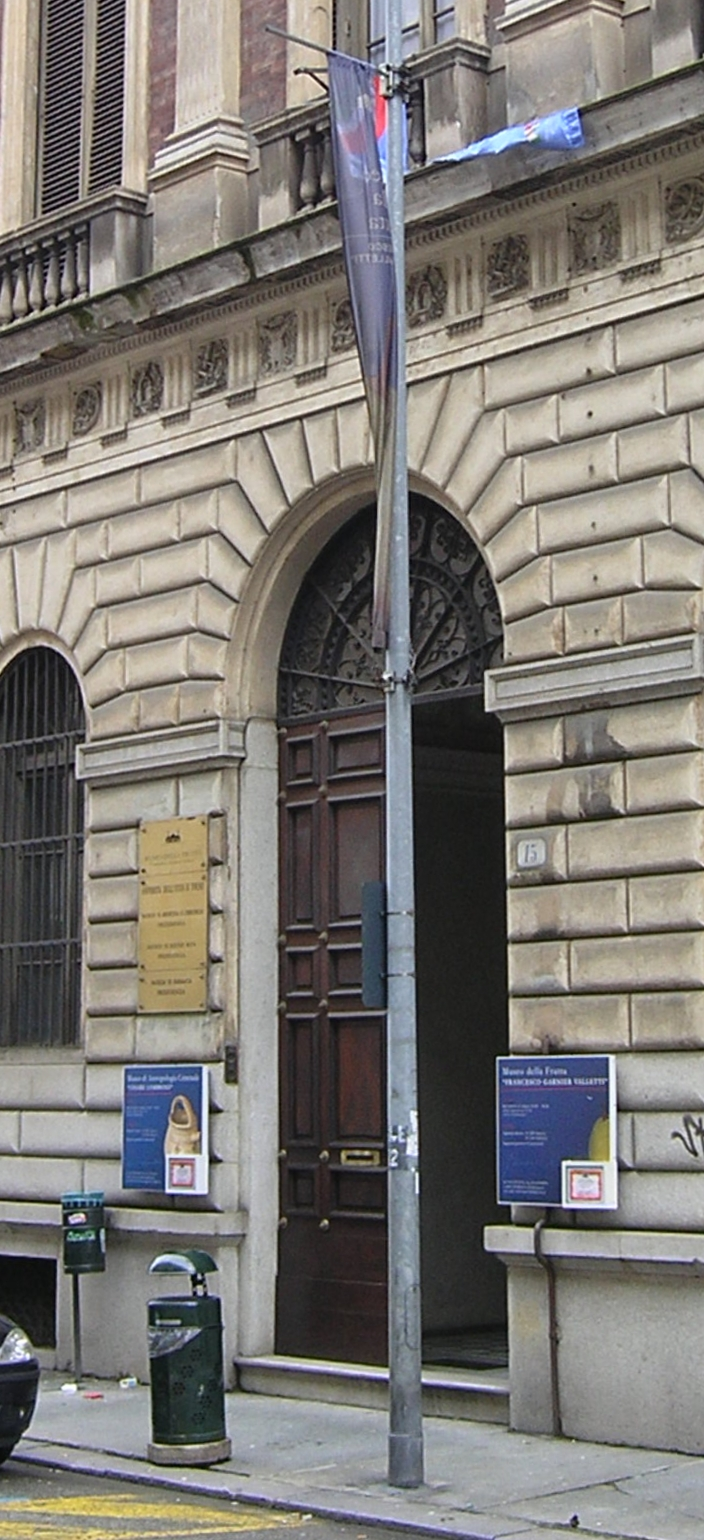
Cesare Lombroso Museum of Criminal Anthropology reopened in Turin.

In 2010, the Cesare Lombroso Museum of Criminal Anthropology reopened in Turin, sparking a series of protests by Southern Italian political activists. The foremost activists, Domenico Iannantuoni, founding member of the 'Per il Sud' party in Milan, and Amedeo Colacino, the mayor of Motta Santa Lucia at the time, established the 'No Lombroso Committee' to continue resistance against the "museum of horrors." On May 17 of the same year, the 'No Lombroso Committee' began a petition to repatriate Villella's skull and permanently close the museum. The movement gained traction, prompting multiple street protests outside the museum and a visit from a delegation led by former Italian Senator Domenico Scilipoti.

While political activists were lambasting the museum for their exhibits, Motta Santa Lucia filed a lawsuit against the City of Turin, the University of Turin, and the museum to retrieve the remains of Villella. Motta Santa Lucia portrayed Villella as a Calabrian patriot and resistance fighter and used this identity to justify the repatriation of his body for a "proper Christian burial." They further argued that the presentation of Villella's skull, as a medium to share Lombroso's outdated atavistic theories, contributed to the existing racism against Southern Italians.

The judge initially ruled in favor of Motta Santa Lucia, stating that the University of Turin, in preventing the burial of Villella's remains, violated the 'Mortuary Police Regulations'. As such, the university was ordered to repatriate Villella's remains to Motta Santa Lucia. In a written opinion, the judge further elaborated that because of the obsolescence of Lombroso's theories, there were no cultural or academic reasons for keeping and displaying the skull.

The city, the university, and the museum immediately appealed the decision. Their counterargument proceeded from Article 10 of the Italian Code of Cultural and Landscape Heritage, which defines 'cultural property' and states that anthropologically significant artifacts are 'cultural property'. The museum argued that the display of Villella's was not a sign of support for Lombroso's theories, but rather a display of history and the development of scientific thought. They also pointed out that the Code of Cultural and Landscape Heritage took precedence over the Mortuary Police Regulations, especially because the Mortuary Police Regulations do not apply to 'cultural property' and artifacts of anthropological interest. The Italian Appellate Court eventually ruled in favor of the museum, upholding its legitimacy and ability to display Villella's remains. In the Court's opinion, the display of Villella's skull is legitimate and legal because Lombroso's theories, although now obsolete and incorrect, shaped 19th and 20th century scientific thought. Consequently, it is possible to simultaneously reject Lombroso's theories while acknowledging that it is in the public's interest to understand the historical, societal, and cultural implications of his theories.

Villella's skull remains in the Cesare Lombroso Museum of Criminal Anthropology in Turin to this day.
