= Bogdan Raditsa =

Croatian historian (1904–1993)

Bogdan Raditsa (in Croatian: Bogdan Radica) (26 August 1904 – 5 December 1993) was a Croatian-American historian, journalist, diplomat, writer, and translator.

== Biography ==
Bogdan Raditsa was born in 1904 in Split, Austro-Hungarian Empire. After his initial studies in his home town, he went to Ljubljana to study between 1923 and 1924. In 1924 he moved to Florence to continue his studies. In 1928 he went to Paris to work as a correspondent, and in the next year he moved to Athens where he lived until 1933, working as the Press representative for the Yugoslavian embassy. From 1933 to 1939 he worked as diplomat, member of the Yugoslavian delegation in the League of Nations in Geneva. In 1935 he married Nina Ferrero, daughter of Guglielmo Ferrero and granddaughter of Cesare Lombroso.

Following the Cvetković–Maček Agreement of 1939 he went to work in the office for external printing in Belgrade. In 1940 he was transferred to Washington, D.C. and, with the fall of Yugoslavia to the Germans in 1941 he began working in the press office in New York City. From 1943 on, he worked with Louis Adamič, an American writer of Slovene origin, in the campaign against the Yugoslav government-in-exile in London and the recognition of Tito and his movement. In October 1944 Raditsa went to London where Ivan Šubašić was working on the creation of a new Yugoslavian government. In 1945 Raditsa briefly worked in the Ministry of Information in Belgrade.

After his return to Belgrade he managed to obtain a visa to go abroad and around Christmas 1945 he travelled to Bari, from where he sent a telegram to his wife Nina: "Left Tito's paradise forever". After returning to the U.S., in 1946 he wrote in New York his famous Reader's Digest article, Yugoslavia's Tragic Lesson to the World. In it he enumerated all the reasons for his disappointment with Tito's Yugoslavia and urged Americans not to fall for false slogans. From 1950 to 1974 he was professor of History at the Fairleigh Dickinson University.

He died in New York City in 1993 at the St. Luke's-Roosevelt Hospital Center. His remains were transferred from New York to Strada in Chianti, a small community near Florence. His library and archives are stored in the Croatian State Archives in Zagreb.
