= Enrico Ferri (criminologist) =

Italian criminologist (1856–1929)

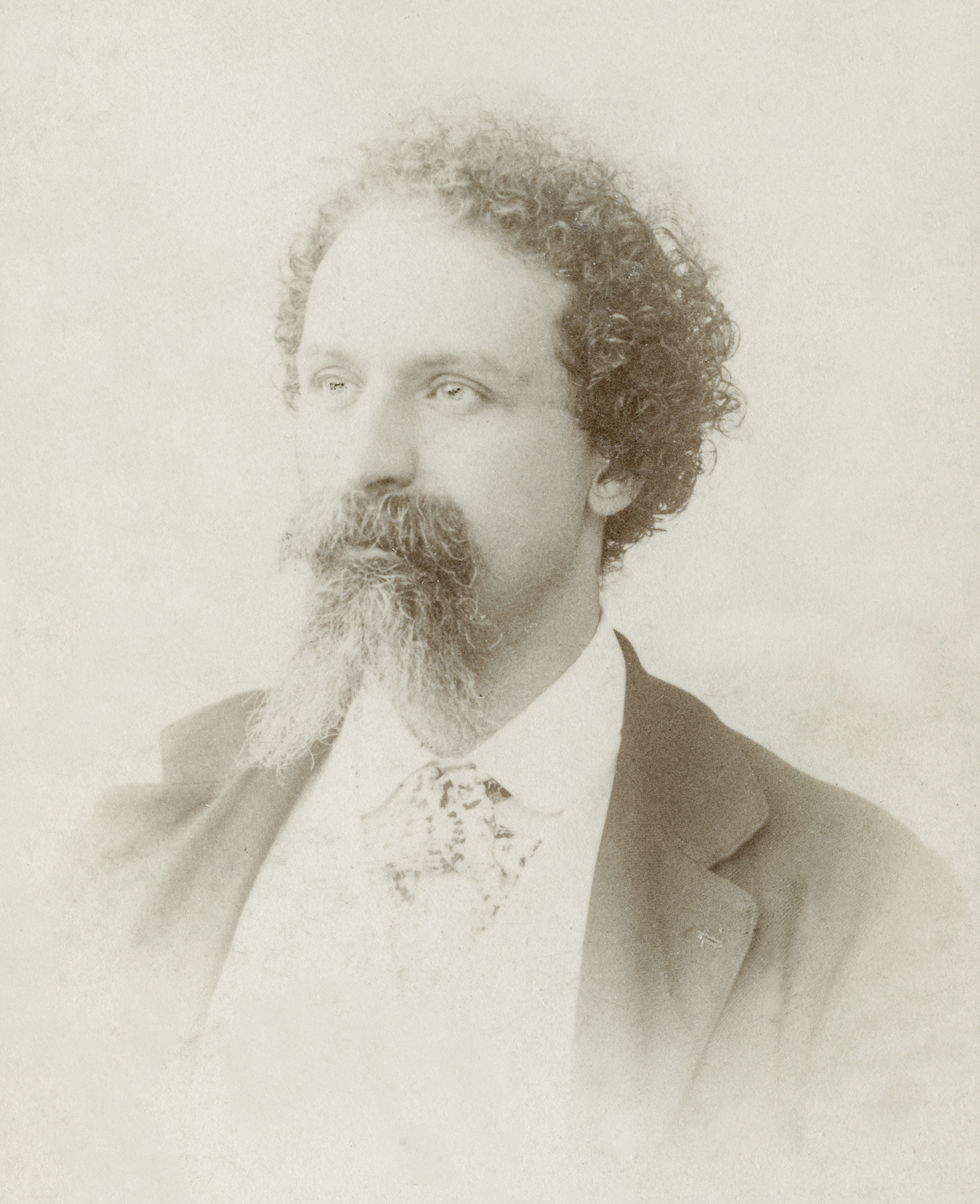
- Born: 25 February 1856; San Benedetto Po, Lombardy–Venetia
- Died: 12 April 1929 (aged 73); Rome, Kingdom of Italy
- Scientific career
- Academic advisors: Cesare Lombroso

Enrico Ferri (Italian pronunciation: [enˈriːko ˈfɛrri]; 25 February 1856 – 12 April 1929) was an Italian criminologist, socialist, and student of Cesare Lombroso, the founder of the Italian school of criminology. While Lombroso researched the purported physiological factors that motivated criminals, Ferri investigated social and economic aspects. He served as editor of the socialist daily Avanti! and in 1884 saw his book Criminal Sociology published. Later, his work served as the basis for Penal Code of Argentina (1921). Although at first he rejected the Italian fascist dictator Benito Mussolini, Ferri later became one of Mussolini and his National Fascist Party's main external supporters.

== Early life ==
Ferri was born on 25 February 1856 in San Benedetto Po, in the modern-day Italian region of Lombardy, then part of the Austrian Empire as the Kingdom of Lombardy–Venetia. He worked as a lecturer first and later as a professor of criminal law, having spent time as a student of Lombroso. While Lombroso researched anthropological criminology, Ferri focused more on social and economic influences on the criminal and crime rates. Ferri's research led him to postulate theories calling for crime prevention methods to be the mainstay of law enforcement, as opposed to the punishment of criminals after their crimes had taken place. He became a founder of the positivist school, and he researched psychological and social positivism as opposed to the biological positivism of Lombroso.

== Political career ==
Ferri, at the time a member of the Italian Radical Party (PRI), was elected to the Parliament of the Kingdom of Italy in 1886. In 1893, he joined the Italian Socialist Party (PSI), and edited their daily newspaper Avanti! In 1900 and 1904, he spoke out in the party congress against the roles of socialist ministers in bourgeois governments. Ferri favoured Italian neutrality during World War I, and he was re-elected as a PSI deputy (member of the Chamber of Deputies) in 1921. Ferri is mentioned several times by Scipio Sighele as a contemporary colleague and friend in Sighele’s early book The Criminal Crowd about mass psychology. Both sociologists shared more or less the same view about the influence of a crowd on the members of that crowd. This fundamental idea was also described by Gabriel Tarde and Gustave Le Bon. In post-war Italy, he became a supporter of Mussolini's fascist regime. Ferri died in 1929.

== Criminological theories ==
Ferri disputed Lombroso's emphasis on biological characteristics of criminals; instead, he focused on the study of psychological characteristics, which he believed accounted for the development of crime in an individual. These characteristics included slang, handwriting, secret symbols, literature, and art, as well as moral insensibility and "a lack of repugnance to the idea and execution of the offence, previous to its commission, and the absence of remorse after committing it".

Ferri argued that sentiments such as religion, love, honour, and loyalty did not contribute to criminal behaviour, as these ideas were too complicated to have a definite impact on a person's basic moral sense, from which Ferri believed criminal behaviour stemmed. Ferri argued that other sentiments, such as hate, cupidity, and vanity had greater influences as they held more control over a person's moral sense. Ferri summarized his theory by defining criminal psychology as a "defective resistance to criminal tendencies and temptations due to that ill-balanced impulsiveness which characterises children and savages".

== Political beliefs ==
Ferri often drew comparisons between socialism and Darwinism, and disputed particular works by Ernst Haeckel that highlighted contradictions between the two schools of thought. Ferri instead argued that Darwinism provided socialism with its key scientific principles. Ferri viewed religion and science as inversely proportional; thus, as one rose in strength, the other declined. Ferri observed that as Darwinism dealt a damaging blow to religion and the origins of the universe according to the Catholic Church (the Genesis creation myth), so socialism rose in comparison. Thus, Ferri argued that socialism was an extension of Darwinism and the theory of evolution. At the end of his life, he became one of the main supporters of Mussolini. He started to consider fascism as an expression of socialist ideals and that it was the "affirmation of the state against liberal individualism".

== Literary works ==
- Studi dalla criminalità in Francia dal 1826 al 1878, 1881.
- Socialismo e criminalità, 1883.
- Sociologia criminale, 1884.
- Relazione sui discorsi inaugurali dei rappresentanti il pubblico ministero negli anni 1884 e 1885 (in Italian). Roma: Tip. Fratelli Bencini. 1886.
- Socialismo e scienza positiva, 1894.
- The Positive School of Criminology: Three Lectures Given at the University of Naples, Italy, on April 22, 23, and 24, 1901. C.H. Kerr. 1906. p. 8.
- I socialisti nazionali e il governo fascista, 1923.
- Il Fascismo in Italia e l'opera di Benito Mussolini, 1928.
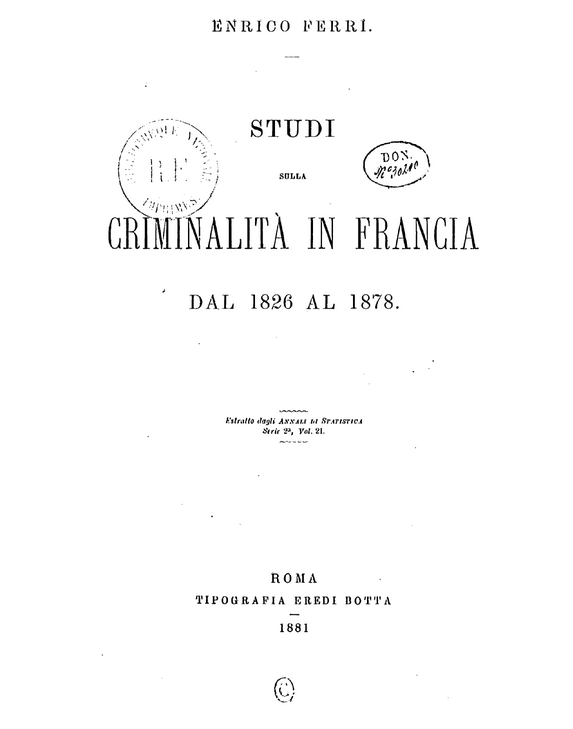
Studi dalla criminalità in Francia dal 1826 al 1878, 1881

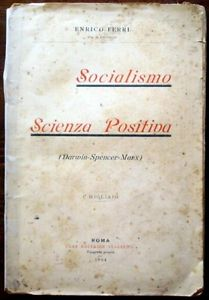
Socialismo e scienza positiva, 1894

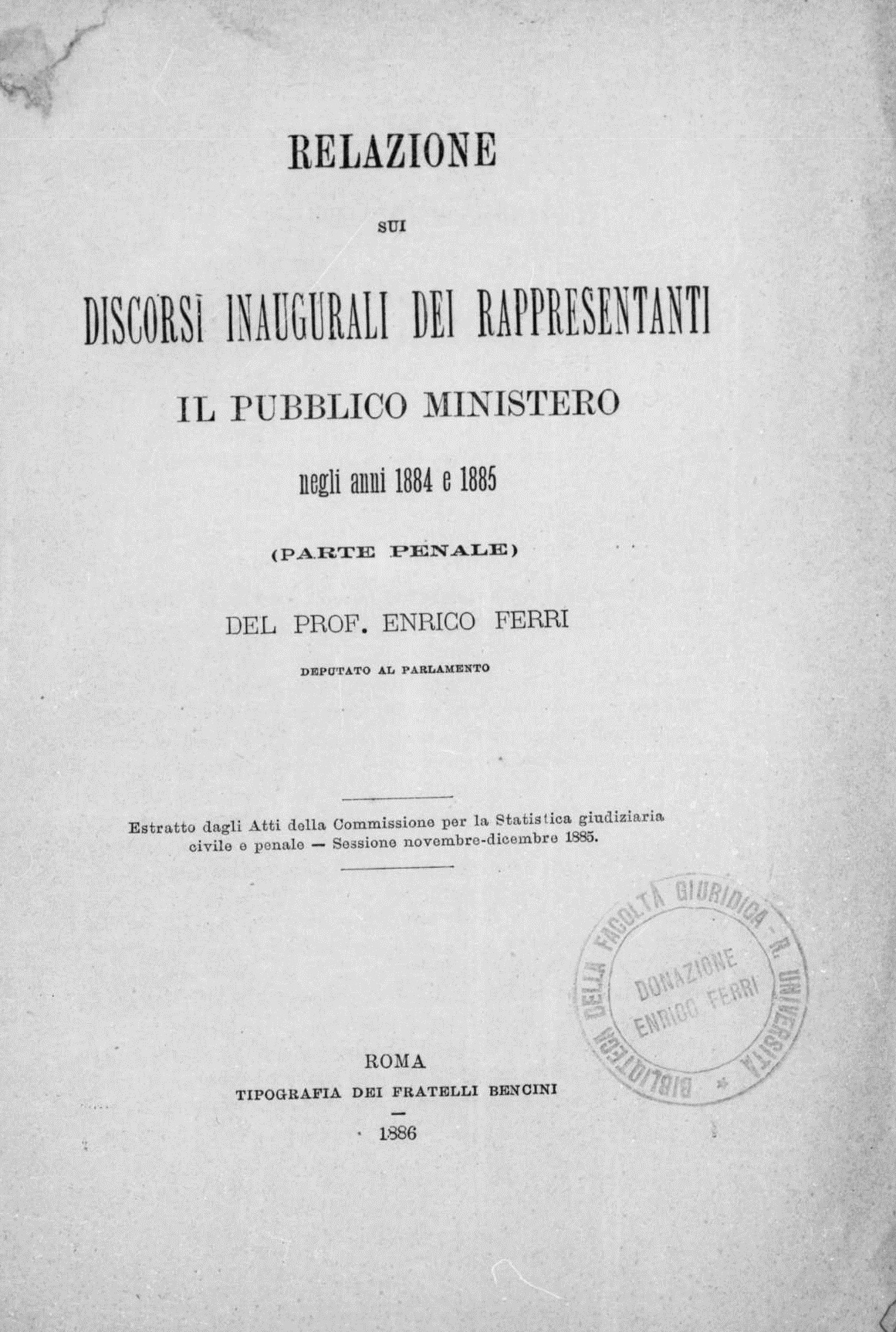
Relazione sui discorsi inaugurali dei rappresentanti il pubblico ministero negli anni 1884 e 1885, 1886

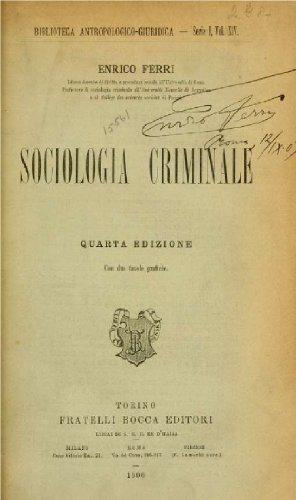
Sociologia criminale, 4th edition, 1906
