= Guglielmo Ferrero =

Italian historian, journalist and novelist

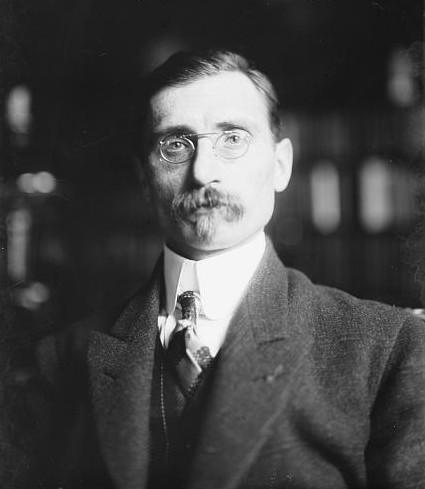
- Born: 21 July 1871
- Died: 3 August 1942 (aged 71)
- Occupations: Historian; Journalist; Novelist

Guglielmo Ferrero (Italian pronunciation: [ɡuʎˈʎɛlmo ferˈrɛːro]; 21 July 1871 — 3 August 1942) was an Italian historian, journalist and novelist, author of The Greatness and Decline of Rome (five volumes 1901–1907 in Italian, English translation 1907–1909) and The Gamble: Bonaparte in Italy, 1796-1797 (1936 in French, English translation 1939). Ferrero was a classical liberal, and he opposed any kind of dictatorship or unlimited government.

== Biography ==
Born in Portici, near Naples, Ferrero studied law in Pisa, Bologna and Turin. Soon afterwards he married Gina Lombroso, a daughter of Cesare Lombroso, the criminologist and psychiatrist with whom he wrote The Female Offender, The Prostitute and The Normal Woman. In 1891-1894 Ferrero travelled extensively in Europe and in 1897 wrote The Young Europe, a book which had a strong influence over James Joyce.

While studying the history of Rome Ferrero contributed to the literary magazine La Ronda based in Rome. Then he turned to political essays and novels (Between Two Worlds in 1913, Speeches to the Deaf in 1925 and The Two Truths in 1933-1939). When the fascist reign of Black Shirts forced liberal intellectuals to leave Italy in 1925, Ferrero refused and was placed under house arrest. In 1929, Ferrero accepted a professorship at the Graduate Institute of International Studies in Geneva. His last works (Adventure, Bonaparte in Italy, The Reconstruction of Europe, The Principles of Power and The Two French Revolutions) were dedicated to the French Revolution and Napoleon. In 1935, his daughter Nina Ferrero married the Yugoslavian diplomat Bogdan Raditsa.

Ferrero was invited to the White House in 1908 by Theodore Roosevelt, who had read The Greatness and Decline of Rome. He gave lectures in the northeast of the USA, which were collected and published in 1909 as Characters and Events of Roman History.

He died in 1942 at the Mont Pèlerin, Switzerland.

== Works ==
Ferrero's magnum opus, The Greatness and Decline of Rome (Grandezza e Decadenza di Roma), was promptly translated into French (1904–1908) and German (1908–1910) as well as into English. Many of his other works have also been translated, especially into French and English. After his move to Geneva, Ferrero worked primarily in French, and this is the language in which his last books were written. English translations include:

- Militarism, a contribution to the Peace Crusade (1903).
- The Greatness and Decline of Rome translated in five volumes by Sir Alfred Zimmern (Volumes 1 and 2) and the Reverend H J Chaytor (Volumes 3 to 5)
  - Volume 1: The Empire-Builders (1907).
  - Volume 2: Julius Caesar (1907).
  - Volume 3: The Fall of an Aristocracy (1907).
  - Volume 4: Rome and Egypt (1908).
  - Volume 5: The Republic of Augustus (1909).
- Characters and Events of Roman History from Caesar to Nero (1909).
- The Women of the Caesars (1911).
- Between the Old World and the New, a novel (1914).
- Ancient Rome and Modern America, a comparative study of morals and manners (1914).
- A Short History of Rome (with Corrado Barbagallo) translated in two volumes by George Chrystal (1918).
  - Volume 1: 754 BC to 44 BC
  - Volume 2: 44 BC to 476 AD
- Europe's Fateful Hour (1918).
- Problems of Peace, from the Holy Alliance to the League of Nations, a message from a European writer to Americans (1919).
- The Ruin of the Ancient Civilization and the Triumph of Christianity, with some consideration of conditions in the Europe of today (1921).
- Peace and War (1933).
- The Gamble: Bonaparte in Italy, 1796-1797 (1939)
- The Reconstruction of Europe: Talleyrand and the Congress of Vienna 1814-1845 (1941).
- The Principles of Power: The Great Political Crisis in History. Translated by Jaeckel, Theodore R. New York: G. P. Putnam's Sons. 1942 – via Internet Archive.

Selected articles

- "Puritanism," The Atlantic Monthly, Vol. CVI, 1910.
- "American Characteristics," The Atlantic Monthly, Vol. CVI, 1910.
- "The Dangers of War in Europe," The Atlantic Monthly, Vol. CXI, 1913.
