= Alexandre Lacassagne =

French criminologist (1843–1924)

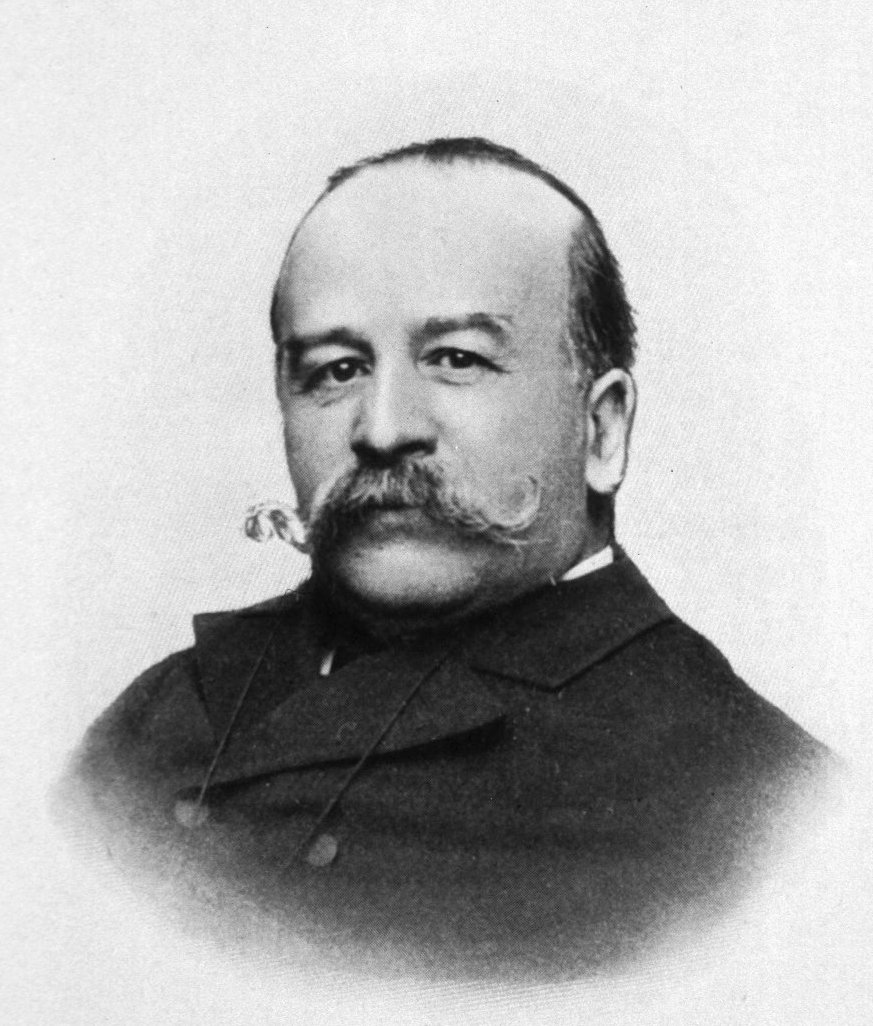
Alexandre Lacassagne

Alexandre Lacassagne (French pronunciation: [alɛksɑ̃dʁ(ə) lakasaɲ]; 17 August 1843 – 24 September 1924) was a French physician and criminologist who was a native of Cahors. He was the founder of the Lacassagne school of criminology, based in Lyon and influential from 1885 to 1914, and the main rival to Lombroso's Italian school.

Lacassagne wrote "Every society gets the kind of criminal it deserves".

== Biography ==
Lacassagne studied at the military school in Strasbourg, and for a period of time worked at Val-de-Grâce military hospital in Paris. Later he attained the chair of Médecine Légale de la Faculté de Lyon (Forensic medicine of the Lyon Faculty), and was also founder of the journal Archives de l'Anthropologie Criminelle. Among his assistants was famed forensics scientist Edmund Locard (1877–1966).

Lacassagne was a principal founder in the fields of medical jurisprudence and criminal anthropology. He was a specialist in the field of toxicology, and was a pioneer regarding bloodstain pattern analysis and the research of bullet markings and their relationship to specific weapons. While he did not come up with a system to classify these markings, Lacassagne's research and study is considered the beginning of the science of ballistics.

He had a keen interest in sociology and psychology, and the correlation of these disciplines to criminal and "deviant" behaviour. He considered an individual's biological predisposition and social environment to be important factors in criminal behaviour.

Lacassagne became famous because of his expertise in various criminal affairs, including the "malle à Gouffé" in 1889, the assassination of President Sadi Carnot, stabbed in 1894 by the Italian anarchist Caserio, and the case of Joseph Vacher (1869–1898), one of the first known French serial killers.

Politically, Lacassagne supported the initiative of his friend Léon Gambetta, an Opportunist Republican, in favour of the 27 May 1885 Act establishing penal colonies, dubbed "Law on relegation of recidivists" (the bill had been introduced by Pierre Waldeck-Rousseau and Martin Feuillée). He also opposed the abolition of death penalty, proposed in 1906 by an alliance of Radicals and Socialists and rejected in 1908, as he considered that some criminals were irredeemable.

In 1877, with Apollinaire Bouchardat and Émile Vallin, he was a founding member of the "Société de Médecine publique et d'Hygiène professionnelle".

Lacassagne died in Lyon.

== Lacassagne school ==
Lacassagne's School was widely influential in France from 1885 to 1914, and the main opponent to Lombroso's Italian School, although its importance had been overshadowed and was recently re-discovered, under the influence of new historians' works. Resuming in 1913 his main thesis, Lacassagne stated:

- "The social environment is the breeding ground of criminality; the germ is the criminal, an element which has no importance until the day where it finds the broth which makes it ferment."
- "To the fatalism which ineluctably follows from anthropological theory, we oppose social initiative."
- "Justice shrivels up, prison corrupts and society has the criminals it deserves."

Lacassagne was originally influenced by Lombroso, but started opposing himself to the latter's theory of the "born criminal," of a "criminal type" and to his insistence on heredity. Under the influence of the sociologist Gabriel Tarde, Lacassagne placed the main emphasis on environmental influence, although the environmental determinism did not exclude, from his viewpoint, hereditary matters nor physical anomalies.

Lacassagne shared with Paul Dubuisson, the co-founder of the Archives d'anthropologie criminelle, and Joseph Gouzer a common admiration for Franz Joseph Gall (1758–1828), the founder of phrenology. He was also influenced by Auguste Comte's positivism, beginning one of his article by a quote from Michelet which claimed that "Science of justice and science of nature are one." Lyon had in fact been an important center for phrenology, with the presence of Fleury Imbert (1796–1851), a disciple of Fourier who married Gall's widow, and Émile Gromier (1811–78), who preceded Lacassagne in the Lyon Faculty. A third, important influence of Lacassagne was hygienism. From these influences, he retained two main principles: organicism and cerebral localisations.

Thus, the Lyon School defined crime as an "anti-physiological movement which occurs in the intimity of the social organism". They considered that the social environment had a physiological influence on the brain, and thus opposed Lombroso's theory which alleged that criminal factors were not only biological, but exclusively individual. Henceforth, the two most important factors for criminological studies were, according to Lacassagne, "biological" and "social", the social itself being considered as a biological organism. Following Gall's theory of cerebral localisations, he divided the brain into three zones, the occipital zone, seat of animal instincts, the parietal zone, used for social activities, and the frontal zone, seat of superior faculties. Furthermore, he divided society itself according to these zones, which produced according to him three "type" of criminals, "thought criminals", "act criminals" and "sentimental or instinctual criminals", respectively corresponding to the frontal social zone, the parietal social zone, and the occipital social zone.

Lacassagne's overshadowing by the Lombroso School was probably due to his insistence on the value of phrenology, which at that time had become discredited in most scientific circles. Criminology was at the time divided into two main schools - one relative more to "biopsychological" theories stressing the importance of individual traits and aiming at establishing an essential difference between honest citizens and criminals, the other opposed to this medical determinism social determinism, mainly influenced by Durkheim. Lacassagne's approach, which combined both biological and social factors, was too ambiguous to last.

== Main publications ==
- De la Putridité morbide et de la septicémie, histoire des théories anciennes et modernes (1872)
- Précis d'hygiène privée et sociale (1876) On-line
- Précis de médecine judiciaire (1878) On-line
- Les Tatouages, étude anthropologique et médico-légale (1881) On-line
- Les Actes de l'état civil : étude médico-légale de la naissance, du mariage, de la mort (1887)
- Les Habitués des prisons de Paris : étude d'anthropologie et de psychologie criminelles (1891) On-line
- Les Établissements insalubres de l'arrondissement de Lyon. Comptes rendus des travaux du Conseil d'hygiène publique et de salubrité du département du Rhône (1891)
- Le Vade-mecum du médecin-expert : guide médical ou aide-mémoire de l'expert, du juge d'instruction, des officiers de police judiciaire, de l'avocat (1892) On-line
- L'Assassinat du président Carnot (1894) On-line
- De la Responsabilité médicale (1898) On-line
- Vacher l'éventreur et les crimes sadiques (1899) On-line
- Précis de médecine légale (1906)
- Peine de mort et criminalité, l'accroissement de la criminalité et l'application de la peine capitale (1908)
- La Mort de Jean-Jacques Rousseau (1913)
- La Verte Vieillesse (1920)

== See also ==
- Italian school of criminology
- Positivist school (criminology)
- History of psychology
- Alphonse Bertillon
- Marc-André Raffalovich (1864–1934), contributor to the Archives d'anthropologie criminelle, writer on homosexuality
