= Alfredo Niceforo =

Italian statistician and criminologist

Alfredo Niceforo (23 January 1876 – 10 March 1960, Rome, Italy) was an Italian statistician and scientific racist.

== Biography ==
Niceforo was born in Castiglione di Sicilia, Catania, Italy, and died March 2, 1960, in Rome. He was an Italian sociologist, criminologist, and statistician who posited the theory that every person has a “deep ego” of antisocial, subconscious impulses that represent a throwback to precivilized existence. Accompanying this ego, and attempting to keep its latent delinquency in check, according to his concept, is a “superior ego” formed by man's social interaction. This theory, which he published in 1902, bears some resemblance to the discoveries of psychoanalysis that were being made about the same time.

Niceforo taught criminology in Lausanne (Switzerland), Brussels (Belgium), and elsewhere and statistics at the universities of Naples and Rome (from 1931). Initially he was influenced by the Italian criminologist Cesare Lombroso (1835–1909), who had theorized the existence of a criminal type, identifiable by certain physical features. Niceforo came to believe, however, that crime could be understood only through a thorough investigation—biological, psychological, and sociological—of the normal human being.

Lombroso had included southern Italians among the races who were more inclined to commit crimes citing southern brigandage as a proof to corroborate his theories. This scientific racism manifested in Niceforo with Crime in Sardinia was published in 1897; here Niceforo related the crime in the Island to the existence of a Mediterranean Race and used the analysis of local music, songs, traditions and folklore as a proof of the Sardinians' racial inferiority and tendency to crime.

One of the first empirical social scientists in Italy, he applied statistics to the problem of finding regularities in social behaviour. Out of these studies came his theory that persons in all societies exhibit certain constant features, which he called residues, one of which was diversity among individuals. He also discerned in every society the stratification of people into social hierarchies and their collection into a mass, observable especially in religious and national ideological systems.

In elaborating his theory of man's dual ego, he maintained that the deep ego often successfully evades the attempts of the superior ego to control it. This view is detailed in his L’ “io” profondo e le sue maschere (1949; “The Deep Ego and Its Masks”).

== Research interests ==
Statistics, Sociology, Criminology, Anthropology, Eugenics, Scientific racism

== Education ==
Degree in Law.

== Academic positions ==
Professor of Statistics at the University of Turin (1914), Messina (1919), Naples (1920) and Rome (1929–1951); member of Accademia Nazionale dei Lincei (1948).

== Honours, awards ==
Italian member of International Sociological Association. Emeritus by University of Rome.

== Known for ==
Anthropological studies, statistical methods for anthropo-sociological research.

== Publications ==
- La delinquenza in Sardegna (1897);
- L'Italia barbara contemporanea (1898);
- Antropologia delle classi povere (1910);
- Le génie de l'argot: essai sur les languages spéciaux, les argots et les parlers magiques (1912);
- La misura della vita: applicazioni del metodo statistico alle scienze naturali, alle scienze sociali, all'arte (1919);
- Il metodo statistico (1923; 3a ed. ampl. 1932);
- Nozioni preliminari e quadri riassuntivi di statistica metodologica (1940; 4a ed. 1947);
- Criminologia (6 voll., 1941–53; n. ed. ampl. 1949–54);
- L'io profondo e le sue maschere: psicologia oscura degli individui e dei gruppi sociali (1949);
- Il mito della civiltà, il mito del progresso (1951);
- La fisionomia nell'arte e nella scienza (1952);
- Avventure e disavventure della personalità e delle umane società (1953);
- Sociologia ed altri scritti (1959).
