= Motta Santa Lucia =

- Comune
- Comune di Motta Santa Lucia
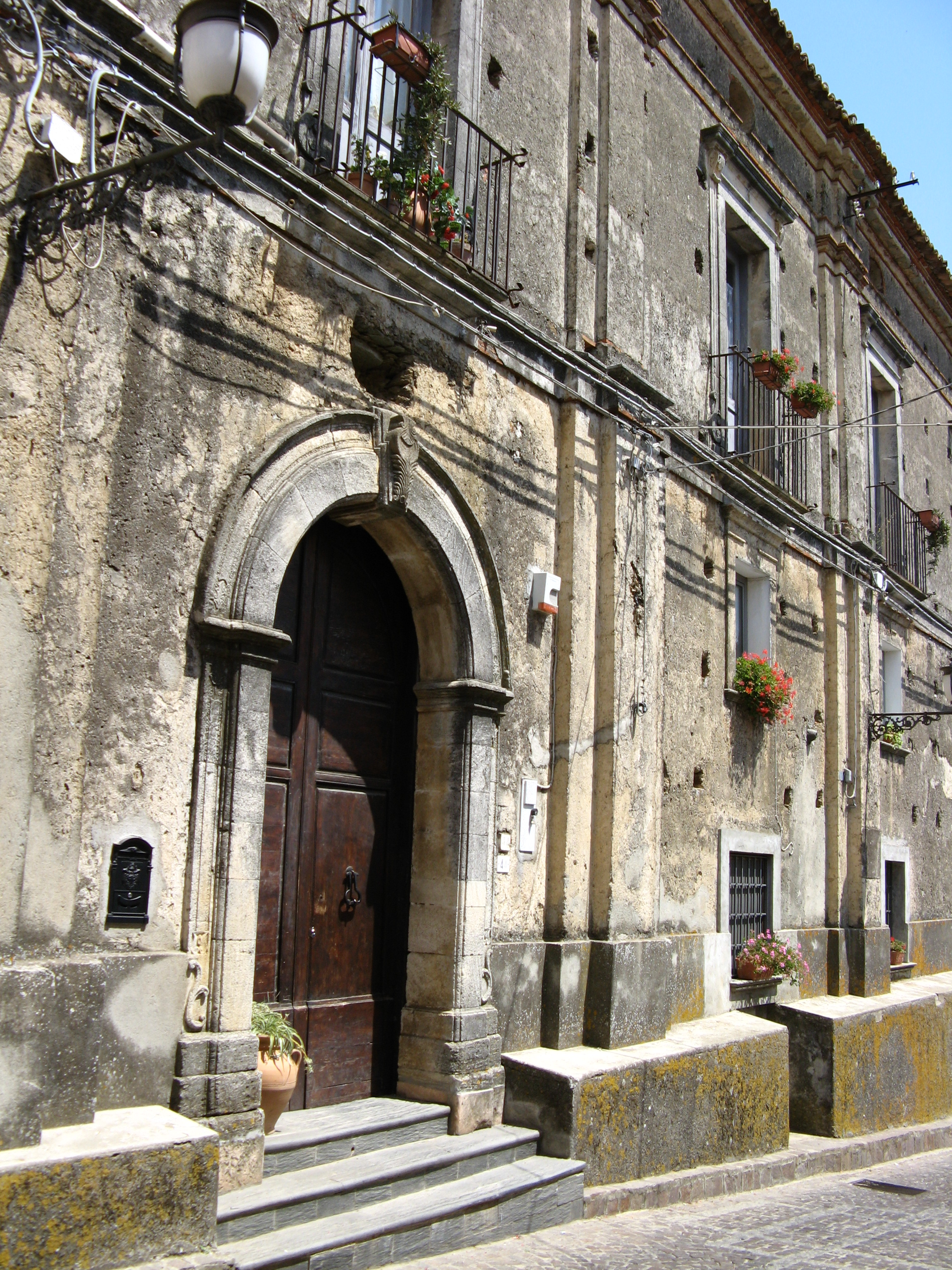

- Coat of arms

- Location within Italy Location within Calabria
- Coordinates: 39°6′N 16°18′E
- Country: Italy
- Region: Calabria
- Province: Catanzaro (CZ)
- Frazioni: Casale, Marignano, Porchia, Salice

Government
  - Mayor: Ivano Egeo

Area
  - Total: 26.3 km^{2} (10.2 sq mi)
- Elevation: 590 m (1,940 ft)

Population (31 December 2013)
  - Total: 875
  - Density: 33.3/km^{2} (86.2/sq mi)
- Demonym: Mottesi
- Time zone: UTC+1 (CET)
  - Summer (DST): UTC+2 (CEST)
- Postal code: 88040
- Dialing code: 0968
- ISTAT code: 079083
- Patron saint: St. Lucy
- Saint day: December 13th
- Website: Official website

Motta Santa Lucia is a comune and town in the province of Catanzaro, Calabria, southern Italy with 792 residents.

== Geography ==
=== Location ===
Motta Santa Lucia stands at the top of a hill 590 meters above sea level, geographically located in the lower Savuto valley, on the slopes of Sila Piccola, on the border with the province of Cosenza. The altimetric profile of the municipal territory is between 169 and 1351 meters above sea level.

The surface area of Motta Santa Lucia is 26.3 km^{2}.

=== Climate ===
In Motta Santa Lucia, for the most part, summers are short, hot, dry and clear and winters are long, cold and rainy.

=== Borders ===
The town is bordered by Conflenti, Martirano, Decollatura, Pedivigliano (CS), Altilia (CS).

== Events and festivals ==
- Saint Lucy: December 13
- "Ballata dei Ciucci di Sant'Anna": Last Sunday of July
- "Ballata dei Babbi": August 15
- "Farce": Carnival

== See also ==
- Giuseppe Villella

== Sources ==
- Imperio Assisi et al., Decollatura e Motta S. Lucia: due comunità del Reventino, Decollatura: Grafica Reventino, 1980.
