= Antonio Marro =

Italian psychologist (1840–1913)

- Born: 30 December 1840; Limone Piemonte, province of Cuneo, Piedmont
- Died: 5 June 1913 (aged 72); Turin, Italy
- Known for: Phrenology
- Scientific career
- Fields: Medicine; Criminology

Antonio Marro (1840-1913) was an Italian psychiatrist, known for his studies on criminology and puberty.

He was born to a family of limited means, but was able to graduate with a degree in medicine and surgery from the University of Turin. After working with the Navy, he moved back to Limone Piemonte.

There, in 1880, he published his Guida all’arte della vita (Guide to the Art of Life). After the death of his first wife, he moved in 1882 with his four children to Turin where he took a position working as a physician for the judiciary and incarceration system. He became an assistant to Cesare Lombroso.

He was prolific in his publications, often in collaboration with Lombroso, such as I germi della pazzia morale nei fanciulli (Origins of the moral mental illness among children, 1883) and Ambidestrismo nei pazzi e nei criminali (Ambidexterity in the deranged and criminal, 1883), Studi psicometrici sui mattoidi e pazzi morali (1885).

Some of his publications attempted to find influences that caused the mental degeneration of progeny, in hopes of finding eugenic solutions. For example, in his 1887 work on Sull’influenza dell’età dei genitori sui caratteri psicofisici dei figli (On the influence of parental age on the Psychophysical characteristics of the children), he claimed that children of older parents were more prone to have absence of affectionate sentiments, and more likely to be criminals, swindlers and murderers. It has been claimed that some of this data was supported by later investigations by other eugenics supporters such as RJ Ewart

In 1885, he became medical director or the insane asylum (manicomio) of Turin. In 1888, he founded the journal of the Annals of Phrenology and Allied Sciences (Annali di freniatria e scienze affini). His focus was on making diagnoses of patients using various measurements. He also studied the pubertal development and its relationship to madness. In 1900, he founded the Istituto medico pedagogico pei fanciulli deficienti in Turin. Some of his ideas, in which intellectual and moral development follow an ontologic pathway, paralleled the Positivist criminology's notions of mental illness as a form of atavism.

== Works ==
- (1880). Guida all’arte della vita. Torino: Roux e Favale.
- (1882). L’igiene rurale. Milano: Sonzogno.
- (1885). I carcerati: studio psicologico dal vero. Torino: Roux e Favale.
- Ricerche analitiche sulle orine di persone lipemaniache (Research on urine of persons with melancholy). 1887, Turin: UTET.
- (1887). I caratteri dei delinquenti: studio antropologico-sociologico. Torino: F.lli Bocca.
- (1889). Lavoro mentale e ricambio materiale. Ricerche sperimentali. Torino: Spandre e Lazzari.
- (1891). Psicosi tossica prodotta da cosmetico a base di mercuriale: comunicazione alla R. Accademia di Medicina di Torino. Torino: Tipografia Spandre e Lazzari.
- (1892). Il processo Romboli: contribuzione allo studio della pazzia transitoria da avvelenamento alcoolico. Torino: Spandre e Lazzari.
- (1893). Della pazzia gemellare: Note ed osservazioni originali. Torino: Spandre e Lazzari.
- (1897). La pubertà studiata nell’uomo e nella donna in rapporto all’antropologia, alla psichiatria, alla pedagogia, ed alla sociologia. Torino: F.lli Bocca.
- (1897). Una visita ad alcuni stabilimenti di cura naturale in Svizzera e Germania. Torino: Tip. Camilla e Bertolero.
- (1900). La prima igiene sessuale. Torino: Fratelli Pozzo.
- (1905). La psichiatria nell’educazione pubblica: comunicazione al Congresso freniatrico in Genova nell’ottobre 1904. Torino: Rosenberg & Sellier.
- (1916). I fattori cerebrali dell’omicidio e la profilassi educativa: la disbiosi, terzo fattore, memoria postuma pubblicata da Giovanni Marro con cenni biografici sull’autore. Torino: Tip. Cooperativa.

== Bibliography ==
- AA.VV. (1960). Istituto Antonio Marro per fanciulli anormali psichici (Moncalieri). Un venticinquennio e una inaugurazione. Torino: Tip. M. Baudano.
- Fumagalli, S. (1941). Un pioniere del lavoro manuale nella scuola: Antonio Marro. Torino: [s.n.].
- Marro, G. (1913). Antonio Marro. Torino: [s.n.].
- Vidari, G. (1924). Antonio Marro: psicologo e pedagogista. Milano: Società editrice Dante Alighieri.
- Riberi, M. (2001). Antonio Marro: un passato che è presente. Cuneo: ICAP.
