= Émile Vallin =

French physician (1833–1924)

Émile Arthur Vallin
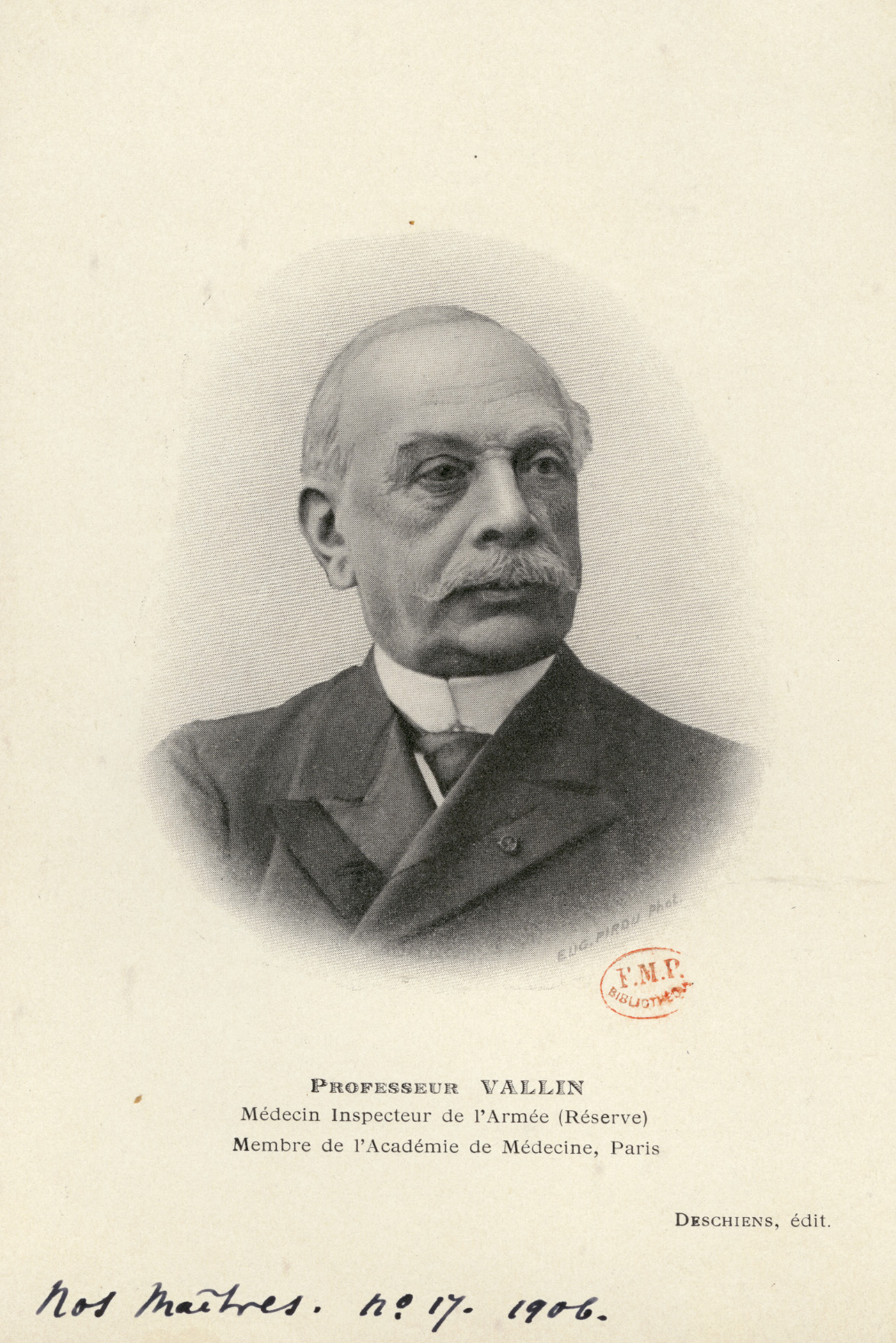
- Born: 27 November 1833; Nantes, Loire-Atlantique, France
- Died: 27 February 1924 (aged 90); Montpellier, Hérault, France
- Education: University of Paris
- Years active: 1853-1894
- Medical career
- Profession: Military physician
- Institutions: French army
- Sub-specialties: Public health
- Awards: Montyon Prize (1854)

Émile Arthur Vallin (27 November 1833 in Nantes – 27 February 1924 in Montpellier) was a French military physician, considered to be a precursor of public health in France a convinced Pasteurian.

== Biography ==
Son of François-Auguste Vallin, a doctor in Nantes and Fanny Robertson-Martel, he married Berthe Marie Vidal on 15 September 1866, whom he divorced to marry Louise Marie Bidermann on 2 April 1882.

After secondary school, he was a prize-winning intern at the Nantes hospitals in the 1853 competition, then a prosector at the Nantes Secondary School of Medicine in 1855. On 8 February 1858, he passed his medical thesis at the Faculty of Medicine in Paris and in December of the same year, he was appointed trainee doctor at the Imperial School of Military Medicine and Pharmacy.

From 5 August 1860 to 16 June 1861, he took part in the Syrian Expeditionary Force. On his return, he was appointed to the Military Hospital in Strasbourg. In 1865, he passed the agrégation examination, which led him to the post of professor of epidemiology at the Val-de-Grâce Army Training Hospital.

On 27 December 1866, he was appointed doctor major 2nd class and officiated at the hospitals of the Algiers division (19 February 1870), at the Médéa military hospital (5 March 1870). He took part in the Franco-Prussian War in the ambulance of the 17th corps headquarters as chief doctor on 2 November 1870.

Promoted to the rank of Major 1st class doctor on 8 February 1871, he was transferred to the army of Versailles, to the 46th line regiment in April, to the hospital of Saint-Omer in July, to that of Valenciennes in October, before being sent to the divisional hospitals of Constantine in February 1872. He was sent to the Bône hospital as acting chief doctor (August 1873), and again to Constantine (October 1873).

In 1874, as full professor of military hygiene and forensic medicine at the École du Val-de-Grâce, he travelled to the major cities of Europe to study their health organisations and institutions, and everywhere he noted the inferiority in France in this field.

He became a senior doctor of 1st class in the Val-de-Grâce on 12 December 1881, and then at the Gros-Caillou hospital from 1 December 1884.

Director of the 3rd corps health service in Rouen in December 1885, he was appointed Medical Inspector at the health service of the military government in Lyon and at the 14th corps (16 June 1888).

From 1888 to 1893, he was director of the new Lyon Military Medical School (28 December 1888).

On 22 April 1893, he was appointed Director of the Paris military government's health service and he ended his career.

== Professional life ==
Public health medicine in France came up against local politics and the incomprehension of a rural population. Entrusted to military doctors (Vallin, Lacassagne, Laveran), it had solid frameworks but poor execution in the field, despite Pasteur's discoveries.

A prefect who does not dare, a mayor who does not want to, a hygienist who cannot

In 1869, Émile Vallin took part in the 5th edition of Michel Lévy's Traité d'Hygiène publique et privée (Treatise on Public and Private Hygiene) with a work on the Hygiene of the Military Profession (Hygiène de la profession militaire). He revised the translation of Griesinger's Infectionskrankheiten ("Infectious diseases") (1877).

In 1879, he founded the Revue d'hygiène et de police sanitaire ("Hygiene and sanitary police review") and he then wrote numerous articles in this journal, all devoted to the most important questions of public, professional or private hygiene, military hygiene, the etiology and prophylaxis of preventable diseases, the sanitation of urban environments, collective and private homes, food hygiene, etc. He also wrote the Traité des désinfectants et de la désinfection (Treatise on Disinfectants and Disinfection) published in 1882.

At the Academy of Medicine, he was interested in alcoholisation, the dangers of mobile stoves, the pathogenesis of heat stroke, disinfection in contagious diseases, alcoholism through breast-feeding, typhoid fever in Paris, stinging caterpillars and the sickness in the basins of silkworm farms and the prophylaxis of tuberculosis. He is also the author of reports on the use of salicylic acid and its derivatives in foodstuffs (1886), on epidemic diseases requiring compulsory declaration (1893), on the sanitary services and the Lazaret of Frioul (1902), on the supply of drinking water to the garrisons (1903).

He was elected member of the Hygiene Section of the Académie Nationale de Médecine on July 7, 1885, and was its annual Secretary from 1898 to 1902. In 1877, with Alexandre Lacassagne and Apollinaire Bouchardat, he was a founding member of the Société de Médecine publique et d'Hygiène professionnelle (Society of Public Medicine and Professional Hygiene). He was also a member of the Medical Society of Hospitals.

As early as 1884, he recommended that:

Tuberculosis be included in the lists of contagious livestock diseases, which obliged livestock breeders to declare it, isolate the sick animals, slaughter them and destroy the meat, which was made possible in 1888 with the publication of a first presidential decree.

He became Paul Brouardel's right-hand man on the Advisory Committee on Public Hygiene which depended on the authority of the Minister of the Interior and in 1889, Pasteur, Brouardel and Vallin, during the Exposition Universelle, invited the members of the departmental hygiene councils to take part in a congress devoted to prophylaxis.

== Publications ==
- De l'inflammation périombilicale dans la tuberculisation du péritoine, A. Parent imprimeur, 1869
- De la salubrité de la profession militaire, Baillière, Paris, 1869
- Recherches expérimentales sur l'insolation et les accidents produits par la chaleur, P. Asselin, 1870
- De la forme ambulatoire ou apyrétique grave de la fièvre typhoïde, P. Asselin, Paris, 1873
- De l'emploi du bromure de potassium comme adjuvant dans le traitement des fièvres intermittentes, A. Hennuyer, Paris, 1873
- Du mouvement de la population Européenne en Algérie, impr. de E. Martinet, 1876
- Traité des maladies infectieuses (Griesinger Wilhelm), J.-B. Baillière et fils, 1877
- Traité des désinfectants et de la désinfection, G. Masson, 1882
- Rapport sur l'enquête concernant la contagion de la phtisie, 1886
- L'emploi de l'acide salicylique et de ses dérivés dans les substances alimentaires, Masson, Paris, 1887
- Hygiene at Paris and in France generally. Royal Society for the Promotion of Health. 1895. pp. 259–264.
- Sur la prophylaxie du paludisme en Corse, avec Laveran Alphonse, 1901
- Conférences sur l'alcoolisme avec Petit Arthur-Léon, Société d'éditions scientifiques, 1901

== Distinctions ==
- Commander of the Legion of Honour (26 December 1894).
- Officer of the Ordre des Palmes académiques (7 June 1876).
- Officer of the Order of the Medjidie (9 October 1886).
- Montyon Prize (1854)

== Legacy ==
A street is named after him in Nantes facing the street Capitaine Yves Hervouët. 47.25931°N 1.56504°W
