= Lorenzo Tenchini =

Italian criminologist (1852–1906)

- Born: 1852; Brescia, Lombardy, Empire of Austria
- Died: 1906 (aged 53–54); Parma, Kingdom of Italy
- Education: University of Parma
- Scientific career
- Fields: criminality neuroanatomy

Lorenzo Tenchini (1852–1906) was born in Brescia, Italy, and studied medicine in Pavia, where he became lecturer of anatomy in 1880.

== Career ==
In 1881, at the age of 29 years, he was appointed professor of anatomy at the University of Parma. Tenchini began to study the morphology of the brains of criminals, later founding the "Museum of Criminal Anthropology". He collected brains of delinquents and their wax masks and studied the relationship between neuroanatomy and criminality. He promoted the building of a lunatic asylum in the province of Parma and was interested in social medicine, including the pellagra scourge in Northern Italy. Tenchini conducted important research work in the field of neuropsychiatry and anthropology. He was one of the founders of criminal anthropology in Italy and sought to explain criminal behavior through the study of neuroanatomy.
