= Apollinaire Bouchardat =

French pharmacist

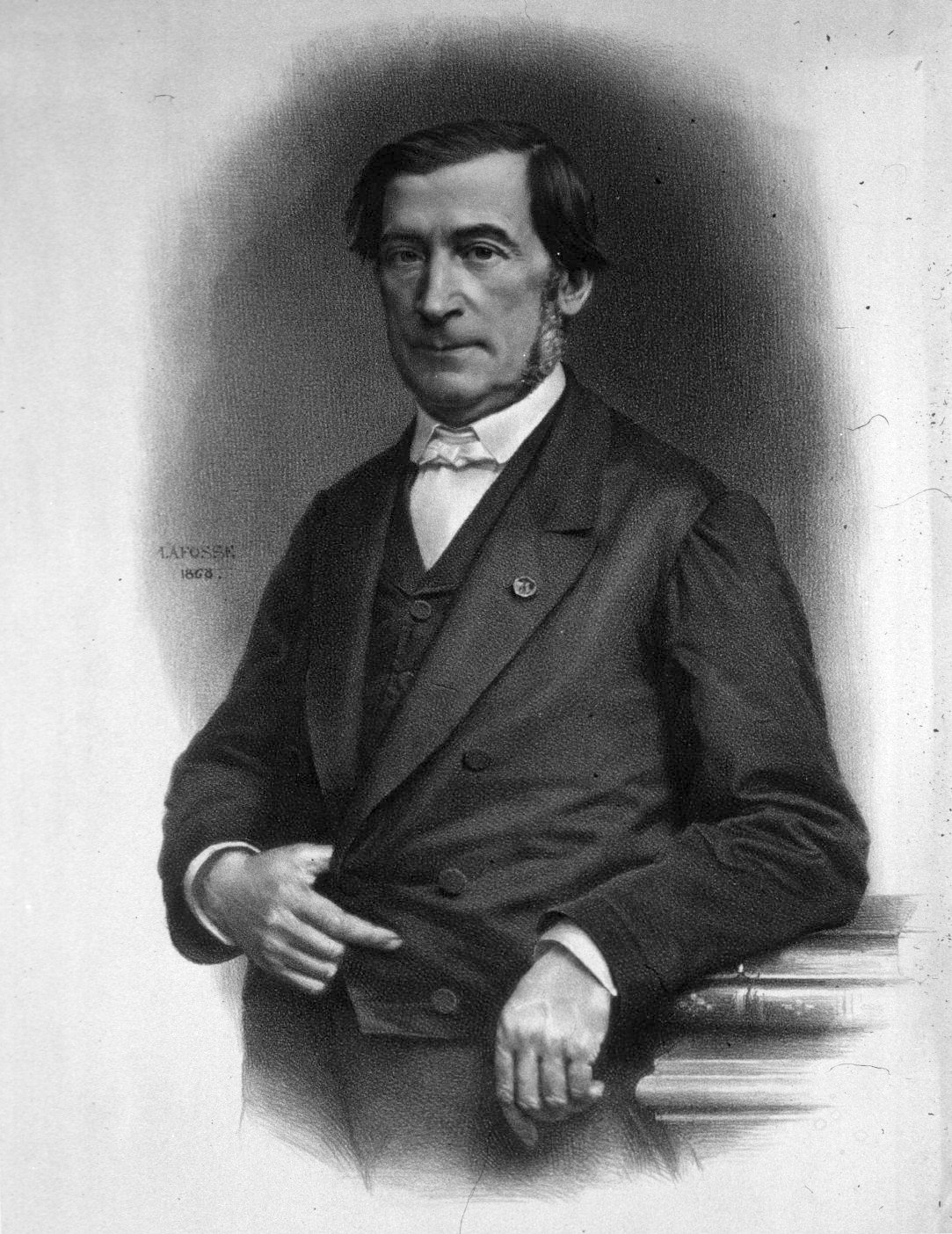
Apollinaire Bouchardat

Apollinaire Bouchardat (July 23, 1809 – April 7, 1886) was a French pharmacist and hygienist born in L'Isle-sur-Serein.

== Biography ==
He studied at the Ecole de pharmacie de Paris and the Muséum d'Histoire Naturelle, and later became chief pharmacist at the Hôtel-Dieu de Paris, where he worked for much of his career. In the mid-1850s he became professor of hygiene at the Faculté de médecine.

Among his written works was the popular "Nouveau Formulaire Magistral", a formulary that was published over many editions. It contained information about health spas and pharmaceutical formulae that included natural cures and remedies for all types of ailments. Beginning in 1840, he was editor of the journal "Annuaire de thérapeutique, de matière médicale de pharmacie et de toxicologie".

In 1877, with Alexandre Lacassagne and Émile Vallin, he was a founding member of the "Société de Médecine publique et d'Hygiène professionnelle"

== Diabetes ==
Bouchardat is often credited as the founder of diabetology, and was a major figure involving dietetic therapy for treatment of diabetes prior to the advent of insulin therapy. He recognized that fasting was a method to reduce glycosuria, and speculated that the principal cause of diabetes was located in the pancreas. In the treatment of the disease, he stressed the importance of exercise, and developed a procedure for self-testing urine to determine the presence of glucose. Bouchardat developed a low-carbohydrate diet for his diabetic patients.

Bouchardat's low-carbohydrate diet included high amounts of fat and protein, a bottle of red wine, days of complete fasting and outside exercise. He suggested that once all carbohydrates had been removed from the diet they could be partially reintroduced after the disappearance of glycosuria which could be detected alone by patients tasting their own urine.

== Associated eponym ==
- "Bouchardat's treatment": Treatment of diabetes mellitus by use of a low-carbohydrate diet.

== Principal works ==
- Manuel de matière médicale de thérapeutique et de pharmacie, (1838, fifth edition 1873) – Materia medica manual of therapeutics and pharmacy.
- Eléments de matière médicale et de pharmacie (Paris 1839) – Elements of materia medica and pharmacy.
- Nouveau formulaire magistral, etc. (1840, 19th edition 1874).
- De la glycosurie ou Diabète sucré son traitement hygiénique, Paris, (1875, second edition 1883) – On glycosuria or diabetes mellitus and its hygienic treatment.
- Traité d'hygiène publique et privée basée sur l'etiology, 1881 – Treatise on public and private hygiene, based on etiology.
