= Gina Lombroso =

Italian physician and writer (1872–1944)

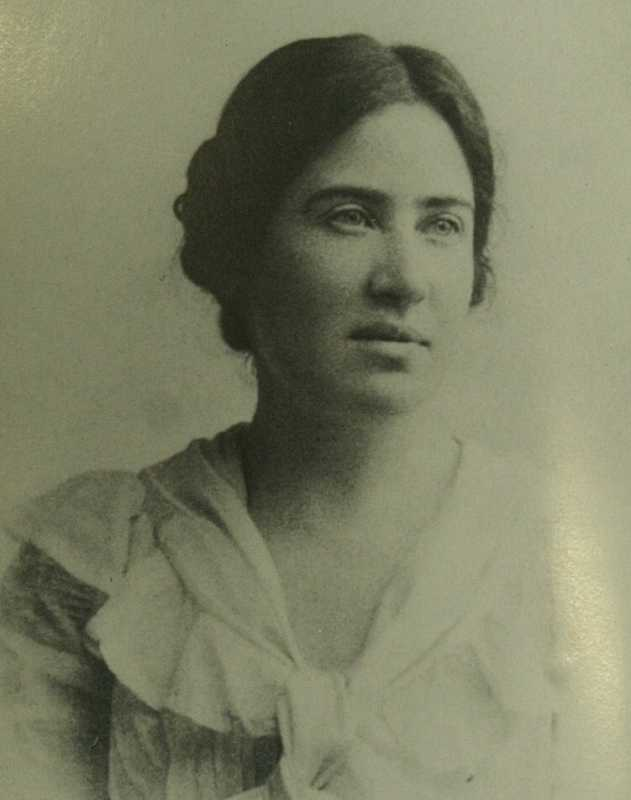
Lombroso in 1892

Gina Elena Zefora Lombroso (also known as Ferrero-Lombroso; 5 October 1872 in Pavia – 27 March 1944 in Geneva) was an Italian physician, writer, psychiatrist, and criminologist, best remembered for her uncredited writings on the subjects of criminology and psychiatry co-authored with her father, anthropologist Cesare Lombroso, and her individual writings on the female condition and industrialisation. She was the wife of Italian historian and writer Guglielmo Ferrero.

== Life ==
Gina Elena Zefora Lombroso was born on 5 October 1872 in Pavia. She was the second of five children to her father, Italian anthropologist Cesara Lombroso. She gained a diploma in medicine in 1891, after studying literature and philosophy. Her thesis was titled I vantaggi della degenerazione (The advantages of degeneration).

She was an Italian physician, writer, psychiatrist, and criminologist, best remembered for her uncredited writings on the subjects of criminology and psychiatry co-authored with her father Cesare Lombroso, her individual writings on the female condition and industrialisation. She was the wife of Italian historian and writer Guglielmo Ferrero (1871–1942) and hence adopted the surname Ferrero-Lombroso. Their son Leo Ferrero (1903–1933), a writer and playwright, died in a car accident in Santa Fe (USA).

Lombroso was an anti-feminist and anti-suffragist. She published L'Anima della Donna (The Soul of Woman: Reflections on Life) in 1920, and it attracted international attention. It was published in twelve languages and in three editions. Some claimed that the French edition was supposedly responsible for the defeat of suffrage in France.

In 1927 Lombroso was listed alongside Maria Montessori as one of the journal Quaderni di psichiatria's 'top psychologists and hygienists.'

She died on 27 March 1944 in Geneva. She is buried with her husband and son at the Cimetière des Rois in Geneva, Switzerland.

== Notable works ==
- Sulle condizioni sociali economiche degli operai di un sobborgo di Torino (1896)
- I coefficienti della vittoria negli scioper (1897)
- Sulle cause e sui rimedi dell'analfabetismo sociale (1898)
- I vantaggi della degenerazione (1904)
- Cesare Lombroso. Appunti sulla vita. Le opere (1906)
- Nell'America Meridionale (Brasile-Uruguay-Argentina) (1908)
- Cesare Lombroso. Storia della vita e delle opere narrata dalla figlia (1921)
- La donna nella vita. Riflessioni e deduzioni (1923)
- Anime di donna. Vite vere (1925)
- La donna nella società attuale (1927)
- Le tragedie del progresso meccanico (1930)
