= Daniel Pick =

British history professor and psychoanalyst

Daniel Pick is a British historian, psychoanalyst, university teacher, writer and occasional broadcaster. Between 2014 and 2021, he was the recipient of a senior Investigator grant from the Wellcome Trust and led a research group at Birkbeck exploring the history of the human sciences and 'psy' professions during the Cold War. The project was entitled 'Hidden Persuaders': Brainwashing, Culture, Clinical Knowledge and the Cold War Human Sciences, c. 1950-1990'.

He read English at the University of Cambridge, before taking a PhD in History. He is Professor of History at Birkbeck College, University of London, a fellow and training analyst of the British Psychoanalytical Society and author of numerous articles and several books on modern cultural history, psychoanalysis, and the history of the human sciences. These include Faces of Degeneration (CUP, 1989), The Pursuit of the Nazi Mind (OUP, 2012). and Brainwashed: A New History of Thought Control (Profile/Wellcome Collection, 2022) He has written and taught at London University for many years, on aspects of the history of psychoanalysis and psychiatry, modernism, the relationship of Freudian thought to historiography, Victorian evolutionary theory, eugenics and social Darwinism, ideas of war and peace, fin-de-siècle literature, and the history of cultural attitudes to crime and madness. He is an associate editor of History Workshop Journal.

Pick has presented a number of radio programmes, for the BBC, including 'The Unconscious Life of Bombs’, BBC Radio 4 (December 2017); ‘Dictators on the Couch’, BBC Radio 4 (June 2017); and ‘Freud for our Times’, BBC Radio 4 (December 2016).

== Selected works ==
- Brainwashed: A New History of Thought Control (Profile/Wellcome Collection, 2022)
- Co-editor (with Matt ffytche), Psychoanalysis in the Age of Totalitarianism (Routledge, 2016)
- Psychoanalysis: A Very Short Introduction (Oxford University Press, 2015)
- The Pursuit of the Nazi Mind: Hitler, Hess and the Analysts (Oxford University Press, 2012); paperback (2014)
- Rome or Death: The Obsessions of General Garibaldi (Jonathan Cape, 2005; Pimlico 2006)
- Co-editor (with Lyndal Roper), Dreams and History: The Interpretation of Dreams from Ancient Greece to Modern Psychoanalysis (Routledge, 2004)
- Svengali's Web: The Alien Enchanter in Modern Culture, Yale University Press, 2000
- Edited and introduced George Du Maurier's novel Trilby (Penguin Classics, 1994)
- War Machine: The Rationalisation of Slaughter in the Modern Age (Yale University Press, 1993)
- Faces of Degeneration: A European Disorder, c. 1848-c.1918, Cambridge University Press, 1989
