= Criminaloid =

A criminaloid (from the word "criminal" and suffix -oid, meaning criminal-like) is a person who projects a respectable, upright façade in an attempt to conceal a criminal personality. This type, first defined by Cesare Lombroso in the later editions of his 1876 work The Criminal Man, unlike ordinary criminals, criminaloids enjoy the respect of society and, because they often establish connections with the government and the law, they are less likely to meet with opposition. Due to their respectable standing, they generally enjoy greater prosperity than the average criminal, and have an automatic advantage over their more conscientious colleagues.

From the Encyclopedia of White Collar and Corporate Crime: "The key to the criminaloid is not evil impulse, but moral insensibility. The criminaloid prefers to prey on the anonymous public. He goes beyond this by convincing others to act instead of acting himself, which protects him from liability and being labeled a criminal, and is instead immune to such scrutiny. The criminaloid practices a protective impersonation of the good. The criminaloid counterfeits the good citizen."
