= Italian school of criminology =

Criminology school

The Italian school of criminology was founded at the end of the 19th century by Cesare Lombroso (1835–1909) and two of his Italian disciples, Enrico Ferri (1856–1929) and Raffaele Garofalo (1851–1934).

== Lombroso's conception of the "atavistic born criminal" ==
The central idea of Lombroso's work came to him as he autopsied the body of a notorious Italian alleged criminal named Giuseppe Villella. Villella's label as a criminal is disputed as northern Italian racism toward southern Italians. As he contemplated Villella's skull, he noted that certain characteristics of it (specifically, a depression on the occiput that he named the median occipital fossa) reminded him of the skulls of "inferior races" and "the lower types of apes, rodents, and birds". The term Lombroso used to describe the appearance of organisms resembling ancestral (prehuman) forms of life is atavism.

Born criminals were thus viewed by Lombroso in his earliest writings as a form of human sub-species (in his later writings he came to view them less as evolutionary throwbacks and more in terms of arrested development and degeneracy). Lombroso believed that atavism could be identified by a number of measurable physical stigmata, which included protruding jaw, drooping eyes, large ears, twisted and flattish nose, long arms relative to the lower limbs, sloping shoulders, and a coccyx that resembled "the stump of a tail."

The concept of atavism was glaringly wrong, but like so many others of his time, Lombroso sought to understand behavioral phenomena with reference to the principles of evolution as they were understood at the time. If humankind was just at one end of the continuum of animal life, it made sense to many people that criminals — who acted "beastly" and who lacked reasoned conscience — were biologically inferior beings. Thus understood, atavism became a popular concept, used for instance by the novelist Émile Zola in the Rougon-Macquart.

== Typology of criminals ==
In addition to the "atavistic born criminal", Lombroso identified two other types: the "insane criminal", and the "criminaloid". Although insane criminals bore some stigmata, they were not "born criminals"; rather they become criminal as a result "of an alteration of the brain, which completely upsets their moral nature." Among the ranks of "insane criminals" were alcoholics, kleptomaniacs, nymphomaniacs, and child molesters.

"Criminaloids" had none of the physical peculiarities of the "born" or "insane criminal", became involved in crime later in life, and tended to commit less serious crimes. "Criminaloids" were further categorized as "habitual criminals", who become so by contact with other criminals, the abuse of alcohol, or other "distressing circumstances." This category included "juridical criminals", who fall afoul of the law by accident; and the "criminal by passion", hot-headed and impulsive persons who commit violent acts when provoked.

== Ferri's penology ==
Ferri was instrumental in formulating the concept of "social defense" as a justification for punishment. This theory of punishment asserts that its purpose is not to deter or to rehabilitate, for how could behavior not based on rational calculus be deterred, and how could born criminals be rehabilitated? Given the assumptions of biological positivism, the only reasonable rationale for punishing offenders is to incapacitate them for as long as possible so that they no longer posed a threat to the peace and security of society.

This theory of punishment provides us with an example of how anthropological assumptions drive policies for dealing with crime and criminals. He was, however, an ardent proponent of measures to prevent crime among "occasional criminals" through social reform, and of efforts to rehabilitate them.

== Garofalo's "natural" definition of crime ==
Garofalo is perhaps best known for his efforts to formulate a "natural" definition of crime. Classical thinkers accepted the legal definition of crime uncritically; crime is what the law says it is. This appeared to be rather arbitrary and "unscientific" to Garofalo (like the British-American system of linear measurement) who wanted to anchor the definition of crime in something natural (like tying linear measurement to the circumference of the earth, as in the metric system).

Garofalo felt that definitions of crime should be anchored in human nature, by which he meant that a given act would be considered a crime if it were universally condemned, and it would be universally condemned if it offended the natural altruistic sentiments of probity (integrity, honesty) and pity (compassion, sympathy). Natural crimes are evil in themselves (mala in se), whereas other kinds of crimes (mala prohibita) are wrong only because they have been defined as such by the law.

Garofalo rejected the classical principle that punishment should fit the crime, arguing instead that it should fit the criminal. As a good positivist, he believed that criminals have little control over their actions. This repudiation of free will (and, therefore, of moral responsibility) and fitting the punishment to the offender would eventually lead to sentencing aimed at the humane and liberal goals of treatment and rehabilitation. For Garofalo, however, the only question to be considered at sentencing was the danger the offender posed to society, which was to be judged by an offender's "peculiarities."

By "peculiarities," Garofalo was not referring to Lombrosian stigmata, but rather to those particular characteristics that place offenders at risk for criminal behavior. He developed four categories of criminals, each meriting different forms of punishment: "extreme", "impulsive", "professional", and "endemic". Society could only be defended from extreme criminals by swiftly executing them, regardless of the crime for which they are being punished. Here Garofalo departed from Lombroso and Ferri, both of whom were against the death penalty, although Lombroso gradually came to accept it for born criminals and for those who committed particularly heinous crimes. Impulsive criminals, a category which included alcoholics and the insane, were to be imprisoned. Professional criminals were psychologically normal individuals who utilize the hedonistic calculus before committing their crimes, and thus require "elimination," either by life imprisonment or transportation to a penal colony overseas. "Endemic crimes", by which Garofalo meant crimes peculiar to a given location or region (mala prohibita), could best be controlled by changes in the law, not by imposing harsh punishments on offenders.

== See also ==
- Alexandre Lacassagne, founder of another school of criminology in France, rival to Lombroso
