= Anthropological criminology =

Subfield of anthropology

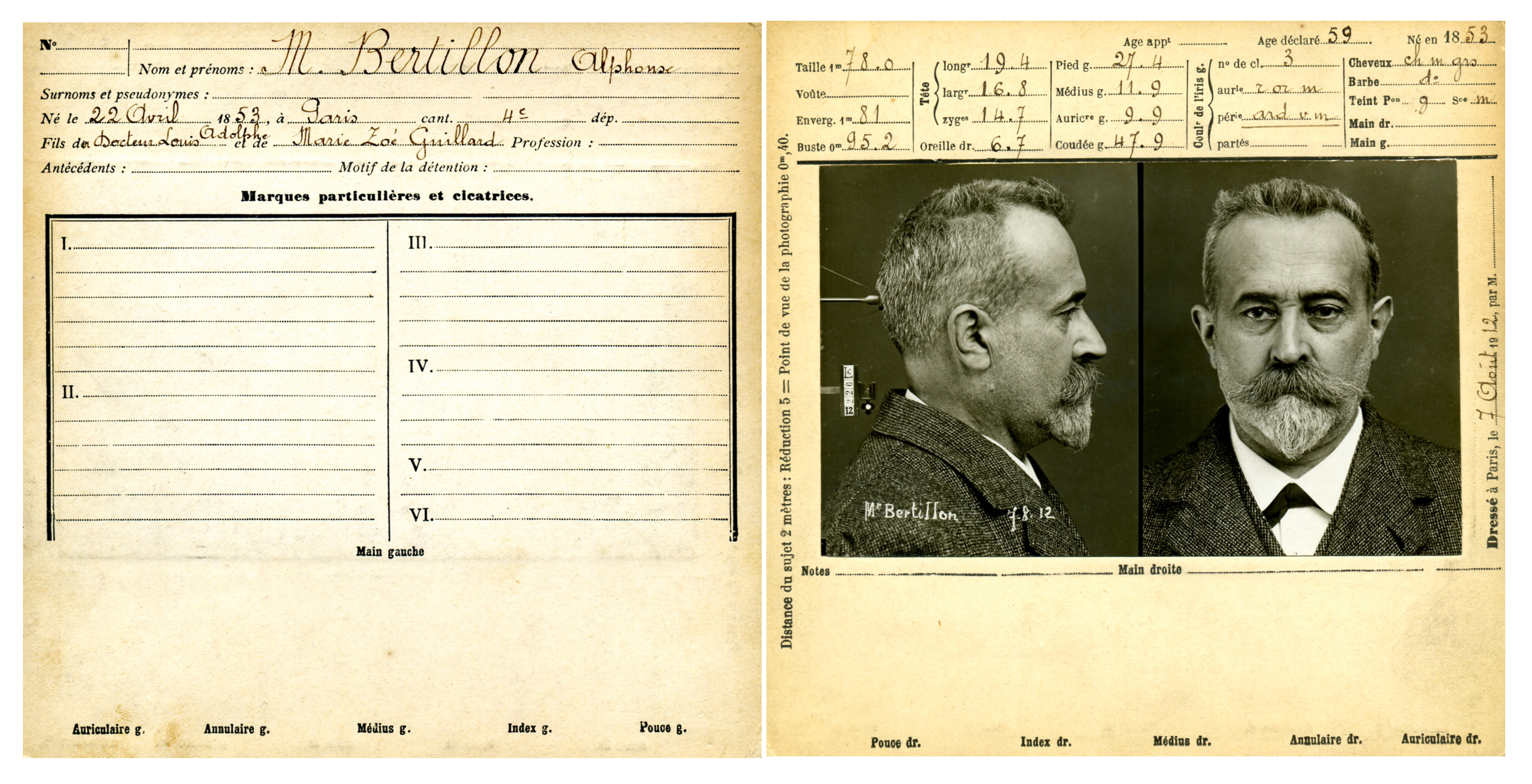
Anthropometric data sheet (both sides) of Alphonse Bertillon, a pioneer in anthropological criminology

Anthropological criminology (sometimes referred to as criminal anthropology, literally a combination of the study of the human species and the study of criminal behaviour) is a field of offender profiling, based on perceived links between the nature of a crime and the personality or physical appearance of the offender.

Although similar to physiognomy and phrenology, the term "criminal anthropology" is generally reserved for the works of the Italian school of criminology of the late 19th century (Cesare Lombroso, Enrico Ferri, Raffaele Garofalo, and Lorenzo Tenchini). Lombroso thought that criminals were born with detectable inferior physiological differences. He popularized the notion of "born criminal" and thought that criminality was a case of atavism or hereditary predisposition. His central idea was to locate crime completely within the individual and divorce it from surrounding social conditions and structures. A founder of the Positivist school of criminology, Lombroso opposed the social positivism developed by the Chicago school and environmental criminology.

== Mugshot and fingerprinting ==
Alphonse Bertillon created a mugshot identification system for criminals prior to the invention of dactyloscopy

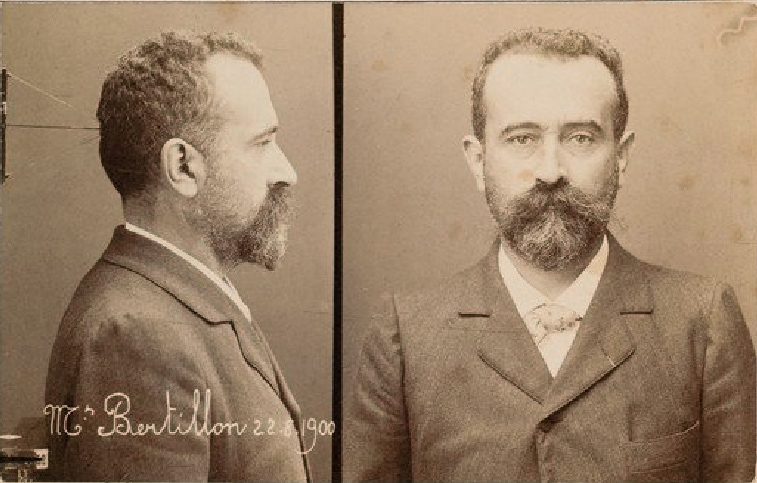
Bertillon selfportrait

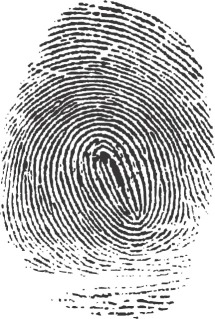
Fingerprint detail

French police officer and biometrics researcher Alphonse Bertillon (1853–1914) created a mugshot identification system for criminals prior to the invention of fingerprinting. Austrian criminal jurist and criminologist Hans Gross (1847–1915), regarded as the "Founding Father" of criminal profiling, was also involved in the development of the theory.

== Theory ==
In the 19th century, Cesare Lombroso and his students performed autopsies on the cadavers of convicted criminals and declared that they had discovered similarities between the physiologies of the formers' bodies and those of "primitive humans" (i.e., non-human primates), such as monkeys and apes. Most of these similarities involved receding foreheads, height, head shape, and size; Lombroso postulated the theory of the born criminal based on these physical characteristics. Moreover, he also declared that the female offender was worse than the male, as they had distinct masculine characteristics.

Lombroso outlined 14 physiognomic characteristics which he and his followers believed to be common in all criminals, some of which were (but are not limited to): unusually short or tall height; small head, but large face; fleshy lips, but thin upper lip; protuberances (bumps) on head, in back of head and around ear; wrinkles on forehead and face; large sinus cavities or bumpy face; tattoos on body; receding hairline; bumps on head, particularly above left ear; large incisors; bushy eyebrows, tending to meet across nose; large eye sockets, but deep-set eyes; beaked or flat nose; strong jaw line; small and sloping forehead; small or weak chin; thin neck; sloping shoulders, but large chest; large, protruding ears; long arms; high cheek bones; pointy or snubbed fingers or toes.

Lombroso published several works regarding his research in the field of criminal anthropology: The Criminal Man, The Female Offender (originally titled Criminal Woman, the Prostitute, and the Normal Woman) and Criminal Man, According to the Classification of Cesare Lombroso.

=== Social Darwinism ===
The theory of anthropological criminology was influenced heavily by the theory of evolution of Charles Darwin (1809–1882). However, the influences came mainly from the political and racial views of Herbert Spencer that had reinterpreted Darwin's evolutionary theory in order to fit his own worldview based on the concept of social Darwinism, specifically that some human races were morally superior to others. This idea was in fact spawned by Spencer but nevertheless formed a critical part of anthropological criminology. The work of Cesare Lombroso was continued by social Darwinists in the United States between 1881 and 1911.

=== Modern times ===
Despite general rejection of Lombroso's theories, anthropological criminology still finds a place of sort in modern criminal profiling. Historically (particularly in the 1930s) criminal anthropology had been associated somewhat with eugenics as the idea of a physiological flaw in the human species was often associated with plans to remove such traits.

This was found primarily in the United States with the American Eugenics Movement between 1907 and 1939 and the Jim Crow laws that enforced racial segregation until the Civil Rights Act of 1964, and also in Nazi Germany between 1933 and 1945, where 275,000–300,000 people with disabilities were killed (Note: As many as 100,000 people may have been killed directly as part of Aktion T4. Mass euthanasia killings were also carried out in the Central and Eastern European countries and territories occupied by Nazi Germany during the war (see Nazi war crimes). Categories are fluid and no definitive figure can be assigned but historians put the total number of victims at around 300,000.) in the concentration camps as part of Hitler's eugenics program to purify the "Aryan race" from perceived undesirable traits in accordance with the Nazi ideology and its racial policies.

Criminal anthropology, and the closely related study of physiognomy, have also found their way into studies of social psychology and forensic psychology. Studies into the nature of twins also combines aspects of criminal anthropology, as some studies reveal that identical twins share a likelihood of criminal activities more so than non-identical twins. Lombroso's theories are also found in studies of Galvanic skin response and XYY chromosome syndrome.

== See also ==
- Biosocial criminology
- Criminal psychology
- Cultural bias
- Darwinian anthropology
- Evolutionary psychology
- Implicit stereotype
- List of unsolved murders (1900–1979)
- List of unsolved murders (before 1900)
- Marginalization
- Pathognomy
- Personality psychology
- Phrenology
- Physiognomy
- Pro-slavery thought
- Pseudo-scientific racist theories
- Racial bias in criminal news
- Sex differences in crime
- Sex differences in psychology

== Bibliography ==
- Black, Edwin (2018) [2003]. War Against the Weak: Eugenics and America's Campaign to Create a Master Race (Reprint ed.). New York City: Barnes & Noble. ISBN 9780914153399.
- Garbarino, Merwyn S. (1977). Sociocultural Theory in Anthropology: A Short History. New York City: Holt, Rinehart, and Winston. ISBN 978-0-88133-056-4.
