= Cesare Lombroso =

Italian criminologist (1835–1909)

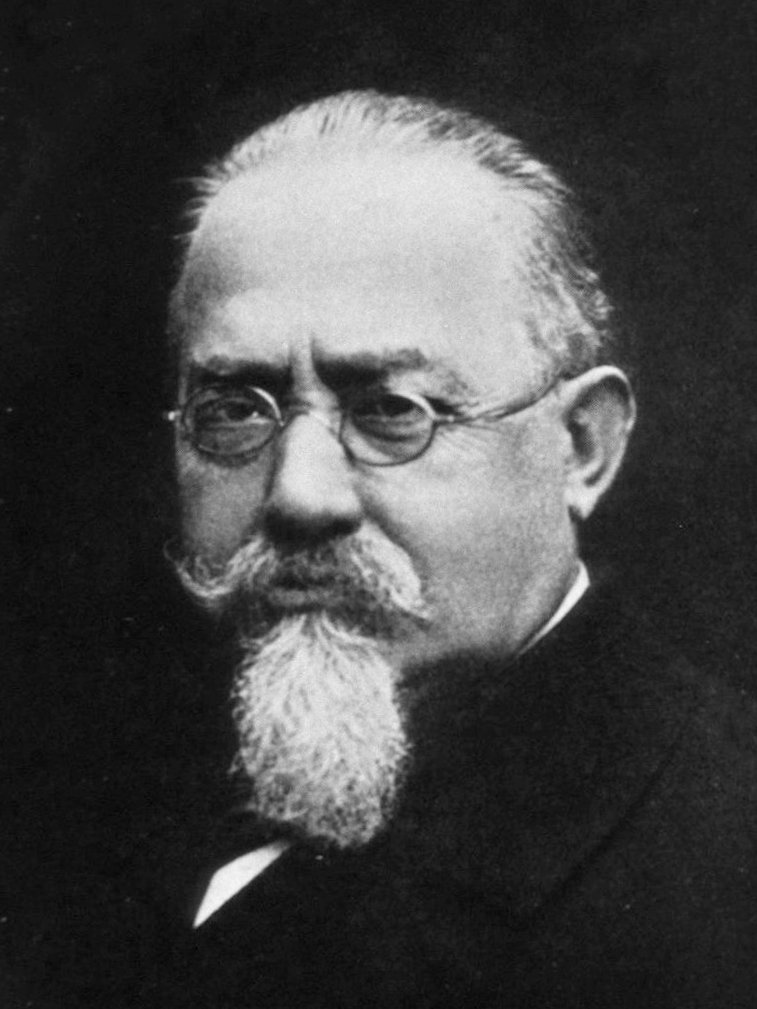
- Born: Ezechia Marco Lombroso; 6 November 1835; Verona, Lombardy–Venetia
- Died: 19 October 1909 (aged 73); Turin, Kingdom of Italy
- Known for: Italian school of positivist criminology
- Children: Gina Lombroso
- Scientific career
- Fields: Medicine; Criminology

Signature
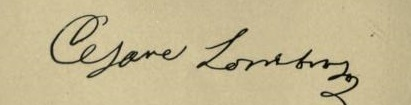

Cesare Lombroso (/lɒmˈbroʊsoʊ/ lom-BROH-soh, US also /lɔːmˈ-/ lawm-; Italian: [ˈtʃeːzare lomˈbroːzo, ˈtʃɛː-, -oːso]; born Ezechia Marco Lombroso; 6 November 1835 – 19 October 1909) was an Italian eugenicist, criminologist, phrenologist, physician, and founder of the Italian school of criminology. He is considered the founder of modern criminology by changing the Western notions of individual responsibility.

Lombroso rejected the established classical school, which held that crime was a characteristic trait of human nature. Instead, using concepts drawn from physiognomy, degeneration theory, psychiatry, and Social Darwinism, Lombroso's theory of anthropological criminology essentially stated that criminality was inherited, and that someone "born criminal" could be identified by physical (congenital) defects, which confirmed a criminal as savage or atavistic.

== Early life and education ==
Lombroso was born in Verona, Kingdom of Lombardy–Venetia, on 6 November 1835 to a wealthy Jewish family. His father was Aronne Lombroso, a tradesman from Verona, and his mother was Zeffora (or Zefira) Levi from Chieri near Turin. Cesare Lombroso descended from a line of rabbis, which led him to study a wide range of topics in university. He studied literature, linguistics, and archaeology at the universities of Padua, Vienna, and Paris. Despite pursuing these studies in university, Lombroso eventually settled on pursuing a degree in medicine, which he graduated with from the University of Pavia.

== Career ==
Lombroso initially worked as an army surgeon, beginning in 1859 when he enlisted as a volunteer. He claimed that he developed the theory of atavistic criminality during this period. In 1866, he was appointed visiting lecturer at Pavia, and later took charge of the insane asylum at Pesaro in 1871. His research into the bodily characteristics of soldiers and asylum inmates became the foundation of his work on criminal anthropology. He became professor of forensic medicine and hygiene at Turin in 1878. That year he wrote his most important and influential work, L'uomo delinquente (Criminal Man in English), which went through five editions in Italian and was published in various European languages.

Three of his works had been translated into English by 1900, including a partial translation of The Female Offender published in 1895 and read in August of that year by the late nineteenth-century English novelist George Gissing (1857–1903).

Lombroso became a professor of psychiatry (1896) and of criminal anthropology (1906) at Turin University.

== Personal life and final years ==
Lombroso married Nina de Benedetti on 10 April 1870. They had five children together, one of whom—Gina—would go on to publish a summary of Lombroso's work after his death.

He died in Turin in 1909.

== Concept of criminal atavism ==
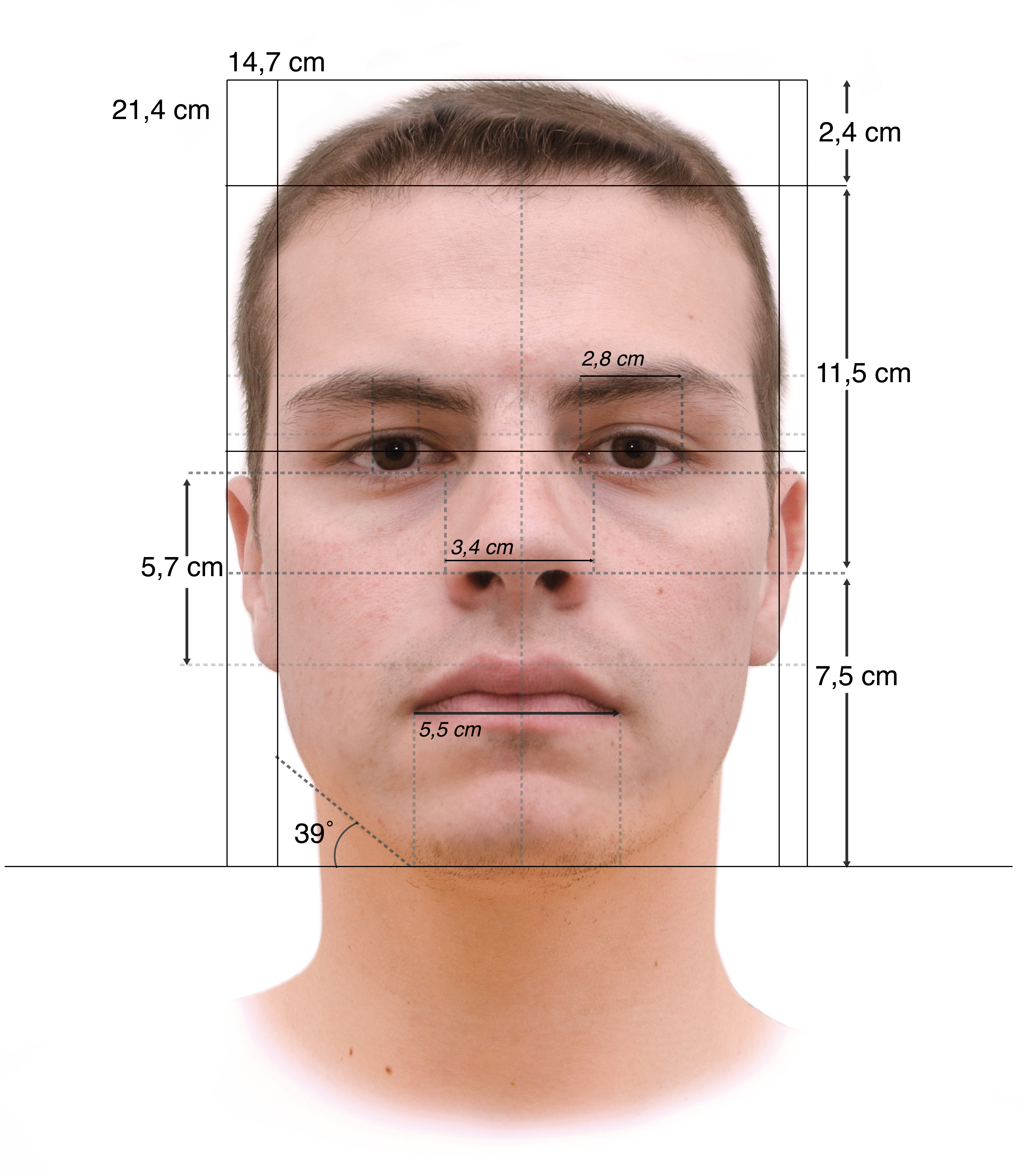
Face measurements based on Lombroso's criminal anthropometry

Lombroso's general theory suggested that criminals are distinguished from noncriminals by multiple physical anomalies. He postulated that criminals represented a reversion to a primitive or subhuman type of person characterized by physical features reminiscent of apes, lower primates, and early humans and to some extent preserved, he said, in modern "savages". The behaviour of these biological "throwbacks" will inevitably be contrary to the rules and expectations of modern civilized society.

Through years of postmortem examinations and anthropometric studies of criminals, the insane, and normal individuals, Lombroso became convinced that the "born criminal" (reo nato, a term given by Ferri) could be anatomically identified by such items as a sloping forehead, ears of unusual size, asymmetry of the face, prognathism, excessive length of arms, asymmetry of the cranium, and other "physical stigmata". Specific criminals, such as thieves, rapists, and murderers, could be distinguished by specific characteristics, he believed. Lombroso also maintained that criminals had less sensitivity to pain and touch; more acute sight; a lack of moral sense, including an absence of remorse; more vanity, impulsiveness, vindictiveness, and cruelty; and other manifestations, such as a special criminal argot and the excessive use of tattooing. For Lombroso, the "born criminal" character was embodied by Vittorio Pini (1859–1903), a famous Italian anarchist who engaged in a series of sensationalist robberies and was one of the founders of illegalism. He chose him to be the archetype of that idea he was developing.

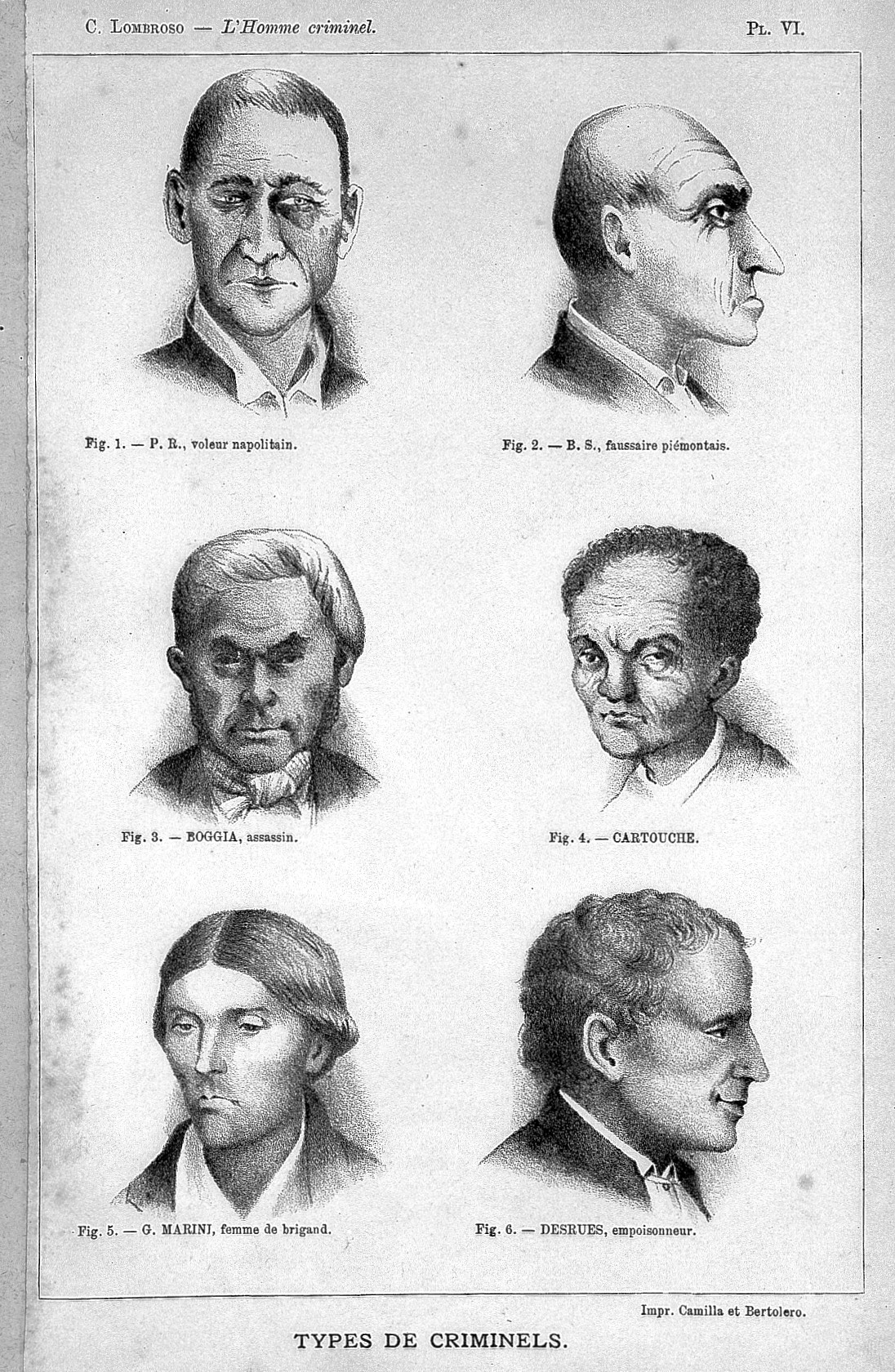
Six figures illustrating types of criminals from Lombroso's Criminal Man

Besides the "born criminal", Lombroso also described "criminaloids", or occasional criminals, criminals by passion, moral imbeciles, and criminal epileptics. He recognized the diminished role of organic factors in many habitual offenders and referred to the delicate balance between predisposing factors (organic, genetic) and precipitating factors such as one's environment, opportunity, or poverty.

In Criminal Woman, as introduced in an English translation by Nicole Hahn Rafter and Mary Gibson, Lombroso used his theory of atavism to explain women's criminal offending. In the text, Lombroso outlines a comparative analysis of "normal women" as opposed to "criminal women" such as "the prostitute." However, Lombroso's "obdurate beliefs" about women presented an "intractable problem" for this theory: "Because he was convinced that women are inferior to men Lombroso was unable to argue, based on his theory of the born criminal, that women's lesser involvement in crime reflected their comparatively lower levels of atavism."

Lombroso's research methods were clinical and descriptive, with precise details of skull dimensions and other measurements. He did not engage in rigorous statistical comparisons of criminals and non-criminals. Although he gave some recognition in his later years to psychological and sociological factors in the etiology of crime, he remained convinced of and identified with, criminal anthropometry. After he died, his skull and brain were measured according to his own theories by a colleague as he requested in his will; his head was preserved in a jar and is still displayed with his collection at the Museum of Psychiatry and Criminology in Turin.

Lombroso's theories were disapproved throughout Europe, especially in schools of medicine: notably by Alexandre Lacassagne in France. His notions of physical differentiation between criminals and non-criminals were seriously challenged by Charles Goring (The English Convict, 1913), who made elaborate comparisons and found insignificant statistical differences.

== Legacy ==
Lombroso is widely regarded as the father of modern criminology. He institutionalized the science of psychiatry in universities. His graduating thesis from the University of Pavia dealt with "endemic cretinism". Over the next several years, Lombroso's fascination with criminal behaviour and society began, and he gained experience managing a mental institution. After a brief stint in the Italian army, Lombroso returned to the University of Pavia and became the first professor specializing in mental health. By the 1880s, his theories had reached the pinnacle of their fame, and his accolades championed them throughout the fields dedicated to examining mental illness. Lombroso differentiated himself from his predecessor and rival, Cesare Beccaria, by depicting his positivist school in opposition to Beccaria's classist one (which centred around the idea that criminal behaviour is born out of free will rather than inherited physical traits). Lombroso's psychiatric theories were conglomerated and collectively called the positivist school by his followers, which included Antonio Marro and Alfredo Niceforo. Ideas similar to Lombroso's assessment of white and northern-European supremacy over other races would be used by fascists to gird, for example, the promulgation of Italian racial laws. His school of thought was only truly abandoned in Italian universities' curriculum after World War II.

Through his various publications, Lombroso established a school of psychiatry based on biological determinism and the idea that mental illness was via genetic factors. A person's predisposition to mental illness was determinable through his appearance, as explained in the aforementioned criminal atavism segment. Lombroso's theory has been cited as possibly "the most influential doctrine" in all areas studying human behaviour, and indeed, its impact extended far and wide. According to Lombroso, criminal appearance was not just based on inherited physiognomy such as nose or skull shape, but also could be judged through superficial features like tattoos on the body. In particular, Lombroso began searching for a relationship between tattoos and an agglomeration of symptoms (which are currently diagnosed as borderline personality disorder). He also believed that tattoos indicated a certain type of criminal.

Through his observations of sex workers and criminals, Lombroso hypothesized a correlation between left-handedness, criminality, and degenerate behaviour. He also propagated the idea that left-handedness leads to other disabilities, by linking left-handedness with neurodegeneration and alcoholism. Lombroso's theories were likely accepted due to the pre-existing regional stigma against left-handedness, and greatly influenced the reception of left-handedness in the 20th century. His hypothesis even manifested in a new way during the 1980s and 1990s with a series of research studies grouping left-handedness with psychiatric disorders and autoimmune diseases.

Despite his stance on inherited immorality and biologically destined criminal behaviour, Lombroso believed in socialism and supposedly sympathized with the stigmatization of lower socioeconomic statuses, placing him at odds with the biological determinism he espoused. His work stereotyping degenerates can even be seen as an influence behind Benito Mussolini's movement to clean the streets of Italy. Many adherents to Lombroso's positivist school stayed powerful during Mussolini's rule, because of the seamless way criminal atavism and biological determinism justified both the racial theories and eugenic tendencies of fascism. However, certain legal institutions did press back against the idea that criminal behaviour is biologically determined.

Within the penal system, Lombroso's work led to new forms of punishment, where occasionally punishment varied based on the defendant's biological background. There are a few instances in which case the physiognomy of the defendant actually mattered more than witness testimony and the defendant was subjected to harsher sentences.

During the period in Italy between the 1850s and 1880s, the Italian government debated legislation for the insanity plea. Judges and lawyers backed Beccaria's classist school, tending to favour the idea that wrongdoers are breaking a societal contract with the option to exercise free will, tying into Beccaria's classist school of social misbehaviour. Lombroso and his followers argued for a criminal code, in which the criminal was understood as unable to act with free will due to their biological predisposition to crime.

Since his research tied criminal behaviour together with the insane, Lombroso is closely credited with the genesis of the criminally insane asylum and forensic psychiatry. His work sponsored the creation of institutions where the criminally insane would be treated for mental illness, rather than placed in jails with their saner counterparts. One example of an asylum for the criminally insane is Bridgewater State Hospital, which is located in the United States. Other examples of these institutions are Matteawan State Hospital and Danvers State Hospital. Most have closed down, but the concept is kept alive with modern correctional facilities like Cook County Jail. This facility houses the largest population of prisoners with mental illness in the United States. However, criminal insane asylums did exist outside of Italy while Lombroso was establishing them within the country. His influence on the asylum was at first regional, but eventually percolated to other countries who adopted some of Lombroso's measures for treating the criminally insane.

In 1927, doctors in Argentina performed an experimental surgery on serial killer Cayetano Santos Godino, who had brutally murdered four children between 1906 and 1912, when he was a street kid and highly dysfunctional. Godino, known for his large ears (nicknamed The Big-Eared Midget), underwent a medical proceeding to shrink his ears, which doctors, under the influence of Lombroso's theories, thought were the root of Godino's evil.

In addition to influencing criminal atavism, Lombroso wrote a book called Genio e Follia, in which he discussed the link between genius and insanity. He believed that genius was an evolutionarily beneficial form of insanity, stemming from the same root as other mental illnesses. This hypothesis led to his request to examine Leo Tolstoy for degenerate qualities during his attendance at the 12th International Medical Congress in Moscow in 1897. The meeting went poorly, and Tolstoy's novel Resurrection shows great disdain for Lombroso's methodology.

Towards the end of his life, Lombroso began to study pellagra, a disease which Joseph Goldberger simultaneously was researching, in rural Italy. He postulated that pellagra came from a nutrition deficit, officially proven by Goldberger. This disease also found its roots in the same poverty that caused cretinism, which Lombroso studied at the start of his medical career. Furthermore, before Lombroso's death, the Italian government passed a law in 1904 standardizing treatment in mental asylums and codifying procedural admittance for mentally ill criminals. This law gave psychiatrists free rein within the criminally insane asylum, validating the field of psychiatry by giving the psychiatrists the sole authority to define and treat the causes of criminal behaviour (a position which Lombroso argued for from his early teaching days to his death).

== The Man of Genius ==
Lombroso believed that genius was closely related to madness. In his attempts to develop these notions, while in Moscow in 1897 he travelled to Yasnaya Polyana to meet Leo Tolstoy in hopes of elucidating and providing evidence for his theory of genius reverting or degenerating into insanity.

Lombroso published The Man of Genius in 1888, a book which argued that artistic genius was a form of hereditary insanity. In order to support this assertion, he began assembling a large collection of "psychiatric art". He published an article on the subject in 1880 in which he isolated thirteen typical features of the "art of the insane." Although his criteria are generally regarded as outdated today, his work inspired later writers on the subject, particularly Hans Prinzhorn.

Lombroso's The Man of Genius provided inspiration for Max Nordau's work, as evidenced by his dedication of Degeneration to Lombroso, whom he considered to be his "dear and honored master". In his exploration of geniuses descending into madness, Lombroso stated that he could only find six men who did not exhibit symptoms of "degeneration" or madness: Galileo, Da Vinci, Voltaire, Machiavelli, Michelangelo and Darwin. By contrast, Lombroso cited that men such as Shakespeare, Plato, Aristotle, Mozart and Dante all displayed "degenerate symptoms". In order to classify geniuses as "degenerate," or insane, Lombroso judged each genius by whether they exhibited "degenerate symptoms," such as precocity, longevity, versatility and inspiration. Lombroso supplemented these psychological observations with skeletal and cranial measurements, including facial angles, "abnormalities" in bone structure, and volumes of brain fluid. Measurements of skulls taken included those from Immanuel Kant, Alessandro Volta, Ugo Foscolo, and Ambrogio Fusinieri. Lombroso's reference to skull measurements was inspired by the phrenological work and research of German doctor Franz Joseph Gall. In commenting on skull measurements, Lombroso made observations such as, "I have noted several characters which anthropologists consider to belong to the lower races, such as prominence of the styloid apophysis". This observation was recorded in response to his analysis of Alessandro Volta's skull. Lombroso connected geniuses to various health disorders as well, by listing signs of degeneration in chapter two of his work, some of which include abnormalities and discrepancies in height and pallor. Lombroso listed the following geniuses, among others, as "sickly and weak during childhood": Demosthenes, Francis Bacon, Descartes, Isaac Newton, John Locke, Adam Smith, Robert Boyle, Alexander Pope, John Flaxman, Nelson, Albrecht von Haller, Körner and Blaise Pascal. Other physical afflictions that Lombroso associated with degeneracy included rickets, emaciation, sterility, lefthandedness, unconsciousness, stupidity, somnambulism, smallness or disproportionality of the body, and amnesia. In his explanation of the connection between genius and the "degenerative marker" of height, Lombroso cites the following people: Robert and Elizabeth Browning, Henrik Ibsen, George Eliot, Thiers, Louis Blanc and Algernon Charles Swinburne, among others. He continues by listing the only "great men of tall stature" that he knows of, including Petrarch, Friedrich Schiller, Foscolo, Bismarck, Charlemagne, Dumas, George Washington, Peter the Great, and Voltaire. Lombroso further cited certain personality traits as markers of degeneracy, such as "a fondness for special words" and "the inspiration of genius".

Lombroso's methods and explanations in The Man of Genius were rebutted and questioned by the American Journal of Psychiatry. In a review of The Man of Genius they stated, "Here we have an hypothesis claiming to be the result of strict scientific investigation and reluctant conviction, bolstered by half-told truths, misrepresentations and assumptions." Lombroso's work was also criticized by Italian anthropologist Giuseppe Sergi, who, in his review of Lombroso's The Man of Genius—and specifically his classifications and definitions of "the genius"—stated, "By creating a genius according to his own fancy, an ideal and abstract being, and not by examining the personality of a real living genius, he naturally arrives at the conclusion that all theories by which the origin of genius is sought to be explained on a basis of observation, and especially that particular one which finds in degeneration the cause or one of the causes of genius, are erroneous." Sergi went on to state that such theorists are "like the worshippers of the saints or of fetishes, who do not recognize the material from which the fetish is made, or the human origin from which the saint has sprung".

== Spiritualism ==
Later in his life Lombroso began investigating mediumship. Although originally sceptical, he later became a believer in spiritualism, after an Italian researcher, Ercole Chiaia, challenged him to verify the authenticity of the medium Eusapia Palladino. After his first experiments with her, in 1891 Lombroso wrote: «I am quite ashamed and grieved at having opposed with so much tenacity the possibility of the so-called Spiritistic facts».

As an atheist Lombroso discusses his views on the paranormal and spiritualism in his book After Death – What? (1909) in which he believed the existence of spirits and claimed that the medium Eusapia Palladino was genuine. An article "Exit Eusapia!", published in the British Medical Journal on 9 November 1895, questioned the scientific legitimacy of the Society for Psychical Research for investigating Palladino, a medium who had a reputation of being a fraud and imposter and expressed surprise that Lombroso had been deceived by Palladino.

The anthropologist Edward Clodd wrote "[Lombroso] swallowed the lot at a gulp, from table raps to materialisation of the departed, spirit photographs and spirit voices; every story, old or new, alike from savage and civilised sources, confirming his will to believe". Lombroso's daughter Gina Ferrero wrote that during the later years of his life, Lombroso suffered from arteriosclerosis and his mental and physical health was wrecked. The sceptic Joseph McCabe wrote that because of this it was not surprising that Palladino managed to fool Lombroso into believing spiritualism by her tricks.

== Literary impact ==
Historian Daniel Pick argues that Lombroso serves "as a curious footnote to late-nineteenth-century literary studies", due to his referencing in famous books of the time. Jacques in Émile Zola's The Beast Within is described as having a jaw that juts forward on the bottom. It is emphasized especially at the end of the book when he is overwhelmed by the desire to kill. The anarchist Karl Yundt in Joseph Conrad's The Secret Agent, delivers a speech denouncing Lombroso. The assistant prosecutor in Leo Tolstoy's Resurrection uses Lombroso's theories to accuse Maslova of being a congenital criminal, and in Bram Stoker's Dracula, Count Dracula is described as having a physical appearance Lombroso would describe as criminal. In Ian Fleming's 1955 James Bond novel Moonraker, Bond mockingly describes the villainous, facially scarred Hugo Drax as a man with whom Lombroso would have been delighted.

== Works ==
=== Original Italian ===
- 1859 Ricerche sul cretinismo in Lombardia
- 1864 Genio e follia
- 1865 Studi clinici sulle mallatie mentali
- 1871 L'uomo bianco e l'uomo di colore
- 1873 Sulla microcefala e sul cretinismo con applicazione alla medicina legale
- 1876 L'uomo delinquente
- 1879 Considerazioni al processo Passannante
- 1881 L'amore nel suicidio e nel delitto
- 1888 L'uomo di genio in rapporto alla psichiatria
- 1890 Sulla medicina legale del cadavere (second edition)
- 1891 Palimsesti del carcere
- 1892 Trattato della pellagra
- 1893 La Donna Delinquente: La prostituta e la donna normale (Co-authored with Lombroso's son-in-law Guglielmo Ferrero).
- 1894 Le più recenti scoperte ed applicazioni della psichiatria ed antropologia criminale
- 1894 Gli anarchici
- 1894 L'antisemitismo e le scienze moderne
- 1897 Genio e degenerazione
- 1898 Les Conquêtes récentes de la psychiatrie
- 1899 Le crime; causes et remédes
- 1900 Lezioni de medicina legale
- 1902 Delitti vecchi e delitti nuovi
- 1909 Ricerche sui fenomeni ipnotici e spiritici

In 1906, a collection of papers on Lombroso was published in Turin as L'opera di Cesare Lombroso nella scienza e nelle sue applicazioni.

=== English translations ===
- 1891 The Man of Genius, Walter Scott.
- 1895 The Female Offender. The 1895 English translation was a partial translation which left out the entire section on the normal woman and which, in true Victorian fashion, sanitised Lombroso's language.
- 1899 Crime: Its Causes and Remedies
- 1909 After Death - What?
- 1911 Criminal Man, According to the Classification of Cesare Lombroso
- 2004 The Criminal Anthropological Writings of Cesare Lombroso
- 2004 Criminal Woman, the Prostitute, and the Normal Woman. Translated by Nicole Hahn Rafter and Mary Gibson.
- 2006 Criminal Man. Translated by Nicole Hahn Rafter and Mary Gibson.

=== Selected articles ===
- "Illustrative Studies in Criminal Anthropology", The Monist, Vol. I, No. 2, 1890.
- "The Physiognomy of the Anarchists", The Monist, Vol. I, No. 3, 1890.
- "Innovation and Inertia in the World of Psychology", The Monist, Vol. I, No. 3, 1890.
- "The Modern Literature of Italy Since the Year 1870", The Monist, Vol. I, No. 3, 1890.
- "Criminal Anthropology Applied to Pedagogy", The Monist, Vol. VI, No. 1, October 1895.
- "The Heredity of Acquired Characteristics," The Forum, Vol. XXIV, 1898.
- "Was Columbus Morally Irresponsible?," The Forum, Vol. XXVII, 1899.
- "Why Criminals of Genius Have No Type," The International Quarterly, Vol. VI, 1902.

=== Introductions ===
- MacDonald, Arthur. Criminology, Introduction by Cesare Lombroso, Funk & Wagnalls Company, 1893.
- Drahms, August. The Criminal, Introduction by Cesare Lombroso, The Macmillan Company, 1900.
- Lombroso–Ferrero, Gina (1911). Criminal man: according to the classification of Cesare Lombroso – With an Introduction by Lombroso.

== Sources ==
- Albrecht, Adalbert (1910). "Cesare Lombroso". Journal of Criminal Law and Criminology. I (2): 71–83. doi:10.2307/1133036. JSTOR 1133036.
- Bianchi, A. G. (11 February 1922). "Cesare Lombroso — A Life of Service". The Living Age.
- Bradley, Kate (2009). "Cesare Lombroso (1835–1909)". Fifty Key Thinkers in Criminology. Routledge.
- Chiò, A.; et al. (2004). "Cesare Lombroso, Cortical Dysplasia, and Epilepsy: Keen Findings and Odd Theories". Neurology. 63 (1): 194. doi:10.1212/wnl.63.1.194-a. PMID 15249647. S2CID 7203375.
- Dipaola, Paolo (2004), Italian anarchists in London (1870–1914) (PhD thesis), London: University of London (GC), p. 278
- Fleming, Rebecca B. (2000). "Scanty Goatees and Palmar Tatoos: Cesare Lombroso's Influence on Science and Popular Opinion" (PDF). The Concord Review.
- Gaakeer, Jeanne (2005). "The Art to Find the Mind's Construction in the Face, Lombroso's Criminal Anthropology and Literature: The Example of Zola, Dostoevsky and Tolstoy". Cardozo Law Review. 26 (6).
- Gatti, Uberto; Verde, Alfredo (2012). "Cesare Lombroso: Methodological Ambiguities and Brilliant Intuitions". International Journal of Law and Psychiatry. 35 (1): 19–26. doi:10.1016/j.ijlp.2011.11.004. PMID 22154472.
- Gibson, Mary (2002). Born to Crime: Cesare Lombroso and the Origins of Biological Criminology. Praeger.
- Gould, Stephen J. (1996). The Mismeasure of Man. W.W. Norton. ISBN 978-0-393-31425-0.
- Hill, John S. (1970). "The Influence of Cesare Lombroso on Frank Norris's Early Fiction". American Literature. 42 (1): 89–91. doi:10.2307/2924383. JSTOR 2924383.
- Horn, David G. (2003). The Criminal Body: Lombroso and the Anatomy of Deviance. Routledge. ISBN 9780415947299.
- Jacobs, Robert G. (1968). "Comrade Ossipon's Favorite Saint: Lombroso and Conrad". Nineteenth-Century Fiction. 23 (1): 74–84. doi:10.2307/2932318. JSTOR 2932318.
- Kenny, Courtney Stanhope (1910). "The Death of Lombroso". Journal of the Society of Comparative Legislation. 10 (2). New Series.
- Knepper, Paul; Ystehede, P. J. (2012). The Cesare Lombroso Handbook. Routledge.
- Kurella, Hans (1911). "Cesare Lombroso: A Modern Man of Science". Rebman Company.
- Kushner, Howard I (2011). "Cesare Lombroso and the Pathology of Left-handedness". The Lancet. 377 (9760): 118–119. doi:10.1016/S0140-6736(11)60009-3. PMID 21226230. S2CID 25970424.
- Kushner, Howard I. (2012). "Deficit or Creativity: Cesare Lombroso, Robert Hertz, and the Meanings of Left-handedness". Laterality: Asymmetries of Body, Brain and Cognition. 18 (4): 416–436. doi:10.1080/1357650x.2012.697171. PMID 22757625. S2CID 30990112.
- Mannheim, Hermann (1960). Pioneers in Criminology. Stevens & Sons.
- Rafter, Nicole Hahn and Mary Gibson. (2004). Introduction to Criminal Woman (English translation). Durham, NC: Duke University Press.
- Past, Elena (2012). Methods of Murder: Beccarian Introspection and Lombrosian Vivisection in Italian Crime Fiction. University of Toronto Press.
- Quirós, Constancio Bernaldo de (1912). "Cesare Lombroso, 1836–1909". Modern Theories of Criminality. Little, Brown & Company.
- Wolfgang, Marvin E. (1961). "Pioneers in Criminology: Cesare Lombroso (1835–1909)". The Journal of Criminal Law, Criminology, and Police Science. 52 (4): 361–391. doi:10.2307/1141263. JSTOR 1141263.
