= The Crowd: A Study of the Popular Mind =

Social psychology book by Gustave Le Bon (1895)

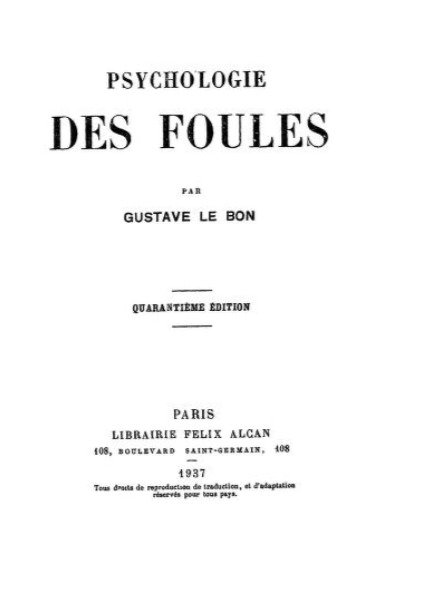
- Original French language edition Psychologie des Foules (Psychology of Crowds, 1937 edition)
- Author: Gustave Le Bon
- Original title: Psychologie des Foules
- Language: French
- Genre: Social psychology
- Publication date: 1895
- Publication place: France
- English publication date: 1896
- Pages: 130
- Text: The Crowd: A Study of the Popular Mind at Internet Archive

The Crowd: A Study of the Popular Mind (French: Psychologie des Foules; literally: Psychology of Crowds) is a book authored by Gustave Le Bon that was first published in 1895.

In the book, Le Bon claims that there are several characteristics of crowd psychology: "impulsiveness, irritability, incapacity to reason, the absence of judgement of the critical spirit, the exaggeration of sentiments, and others". Le Bon claimed that "an individual immersed for some length of time in a crowd soon finds himself – either in consequence of magnetic influence given out by the crowd or from some other cause of which we are ignorant – in a special state, which much resembles the state of fascination in which the hypnotized individual finds himself in the hands of the hypnotizer."

Influenced by Scipio Sighele's The Criminal Crowd (1891), the book had an impact in its turn on Sigmund Freud's Group Psychology and the Analysis of the Ego (1921) and on Adolf Hitler's Mein Kampf (1925–26).

== Table of contents ==
- Introduction: The Era of the Crowds.
- Book I: The Mind of Crowds
  - Chapter I: General Characteristics of Crowds—Psychological Law of Their Mental Unity
  - Chapter II: The Sentiments and Morality of Crowds
  - Chapter III: The Ideas, Reasoning Power, and Imagination of Crowds
  - Chapter IV: A Religious Shape Assumed By All the Convictions of Crowds
- Book II: The Opinions and Beliefs of Crowds
  - Chapter I: Remote Factors of the Opinions and Beliefs of Crowds
  - Chapter II: The Immediate Factors of the Opinions of Crowds
  - Chapter III: The Leaders of Crowds and Their Means of Persuasion
  - Chapter IV: Limitations of the Variability of the Beliefs and Opinions of Crowds
- Book III: The Classification and Description of the Different Kinds of Crowds
  - Chapter I: The Classification of Crowds
  - Chapter II: Crowds Termed Criminal Crowds
  - Chapter III: Criminal Juries
  - Chapter IV: Electoral Crowds
  - Chapter V: Parliamentary Assemblies

== Highlights ==
- Le Bon incorporates Darwin and Haeckel into his thought on heredity and human nature:
  - Environment, circumstances, and events represent the social suggestions of the moment. They may have a considerable influence, but this influence is always momentary if it be contrary to the suggestions of the race; that is, to those which are inherited by a nation from the entire series of its ancestors…The biological sciences have been transformed since embryology has shown the immense influence of the past on the evolution of living beings; and the historical sciences will not undergo a less change when this conception has become more widespread. As yet it is not sufficiently general, and many statesmen are still no further advanced than the theorists of the last century, who believed that a society could break off with its past and be entirely recast on lines suggested solely by the light of reason.
- On national identity and social institutions:
  - A nation does not choose its institutions at will any more than it chooses the colour of its hair or its eyes. Institutions and governments are the product of the race. They are not the creators of an epoch, but are created by it. Peoples are not governed in accordance with their caprices of the moment, but as their character determines that they shall be governed. Centuries are required to form a political system and centuries needed to change it. Institutions have no intrinsic virtue: in themselves they are neither good nor bad. Those which are good at a given moment for a given people may be harmful in the extreme for another nation.
- On individuals and crowds:
  - By the mere fact that he forms part of an organised crowd, a man descends several rungs in the ladder of civilisation. Isolated, he may be a cultivated individual; in a crowd, he is a barbarian — that is, a creature acting by instinct. He possesses the spontaneity, the violence, the ferocity, and also the enthusiasm and heroism of primitive beings, whom he further tends to resemble by the facility with which he allows himself to be impressed by words and images — which would be entirely without action on each of the isolated individuals composing the crowd — and to be induced to commit acts contrary to his most obvious interests and his best-known habits. An individual in a crowd is a grain of sand amid other grains of sand, which the wind stirs up at will.
- On education and egalitarianism:
  - Foremost among the dominant ideas of the present epoch is to be found the notion that instruction is capable of considerably changing men, and has for its unfailing consequence to improve them and even to make them equal. By the mere fact of its being constantly repeated, this assertion has ended by becoming one of the most steadfast democratic dogmas. It would be as difficult now to attack it as it would have been formerly to have attacked the dogmas of the Church.
- On religion, ideology, and fanaticism:
  - A person is not religious solely when he worships a divinity, but when he puts all the resources of his mind, the complete submission of his will, and the whole-souled ardour of fanaticism at the service of a cause or an individual who becomes the goal and guide of his thoughts and actions. Intolerance and fanaticism are the necessary accompaniments of the religious sentiment. They are inevitably displayed by those who believe themselves in the possession of the secret of earthly or eternal happiness. These two characteristics are to be found in all men grouped together when they are inspired by a conviction of any kind. The Jacobins of the Reign of Terror were at bottom as religious as the Catholics of the Inquisition, and their cruel ardour proceeded from the same source.
- On the sovereignty of crowds:
  - The dogma of the sovereignty of crowds is as little defensible, from the philosophical point of view, as the religious dogmas of the Middle Ages, but it enjoys at present the same absolute power they formerly enjoyed. It is as unattackable in consequence as in the past were our religious ideas…The dogma of universal suffrage possesses to-day the power the Christian dogmas formerly possessed. Orators and writers allude to it with a respect and adulation that never fell to the share of Louis XIV. In consequence the same position must be taken up with regard to it as with regard to all religious dogmas. Time alone can act upon them.
- On politicians:
  - The general characteristics of crowds are to be met with in parliamentary assemblies: intellectual simplicity, irritability, suggestibility, the exaggeration of the sentiments and the preponderating influence of a few leaders…It is terrible at times to think of the power that strong conviction combined with extreme narrowness of mind gives a man possessing prestige.
- On government by experts:
  - All our political economists are highly educated, being for the most part professors or academicians, yet is there a single general question — protection, bimetallism — on which they have succeeded in agreeing? The explanation is that their science is only a very attenuated form of our universal ignorance. With regard to social problems, owing to the number of unknown quantities they offer, men are substantially, equally ignorant. In consequence, were the electorate solely composed of persons stuffed with sciences their votes would be no better than those emitted at present. They would be guided in the main by their sentiments and by party spirit. We should be spared none of the difficulties we now have to contend with, and we should certainly be subjected to the oppressive tyranny of castes.
- Impact of civilizing elites and barbarian crowds upon civilization:
  - Civilisations as yet have only been created and directed by a small intellectual aristocracy, never by crowds. Crowds are only powerful for destruction. Their rule is always tantamount to a barbarian phase. A civilisation involves fixed rules, discipline, a passing from the instinctive to the rational state, forethought for the future, an elevated degree of culture — all of them conditions that crowds, left to themselves, have invariably shown themselves incapable of realising. In consequence of the purely destructive nature of their power crowds act like those microbes which hasten the dissolution of enfeebled or dead bodies. When the structure of a civilisation is rotten, it is always the masses that bring about its downfall.

== Criticism and influence ==
The book has a strong connection with Sigmund Freud's Group Psychology and the Analysis of the Ego (1921). In this book Freud refers heavily to the writings of Gustave Le Bon, summarizing his work at the beginning of the book in the chapter Le Bons Schilderung der Massenseele ("Le Bon's description of the group mind"). Like Le Bon, Freud says that as part of the mass, the individual acquires a sense of infinite power allowing him to act on impulses that he would otherwise have to curb as an isolated individual. These feelings of power and security allow the individual not only to act as part of the mass, but also to feel safety in numbers. This is accompanied, however, by a loss of conscious personality and a tendency of the individual to be infected by any emotion within the mass, and to amplify the emotion, in turn, by "mutual induction". Overall, the mass is "impulsive, changeable, and irritable. It is controlled almost exclusively by the unconscious."

Freud extensively quotes Le Bon, who explains that the state of the individual in the crowd is "hypnotic", with which Freud agrees. He adds that the contagion and the higher suggestibility are different kinds of change of the individual in the mass.

The book, translated into German as Psychologie der Massen in 1908, is suggested by the editor of the Polish critical edition of Mein Kampf to have been Adolf Hitler's main prison reading in 1924 as he prepared to write his extensive propaganda tract. Hitler would have taken time to study The Crowd along with some brochures on the techniques of influencing mass behaviour while serving his sentence in the Landsberg Prison for having led the Beer Hall Putsch of 1923 with Erich Ludendorff. Influence of Le Bon's contemptuous ideas about the essential destructive stupidity of the masses, their supposed "femininity" and manipulability, and about the effectiveness of propaganda through simple repetition, leading to a belief in the viability of "mass suggestion", has been noted throughout Hitler's book. The editors of the German critical edition of Mein Kampf say it remains unclear whether Hitler actually knew Le Bon's writings first-hand, and suggest that he may have encountered Le Bon's ideas (shared by various contemporary German medical scholars) through the Munich neurologist Julius R. Rossbach's brochure Die Massenseele of 1919, but they point to The Crowd as one of the most likely sources for the chapter on War Propaganda. Nonetheless, in at least one instance Le Bon's view is argued to have been more optimistic and nuanced about the ethical capacities of the masses than Hitler's. Le Bon is said to have taken many of his notions about the violent tendencies of the masses and their susceptibility to negative influence, primarily through the medium of the press, from Scipio Sighele's The Criminal Crowd (1891).

In Crowds and Power, Elias Canetti analyzes the memoirs of Daniel Paul Schreber with an implicit critique of Sigmund Freud as well as Gustave Le Bon.

Journalist Dan Hancox writes that the misconception of senseless participation, as articulated by Le Bon, is still often used by politicians today to describe public gatherings and marches that they disagree with.

== See also ==
- Philosophical anthropology
- Völkerpsychologie

== Bibliography ==
- Hartmann, Christian; Vordermayer, Thomas; Plöckinger, Othmar; Töppel, Roman, eds. (2016), Hitler, Mein Kampf. Eine kritische Edition (1st ed.), München: Institut für Zeitgeschichte, ISBN 978-3-9814052-3-1
- Le Bon, Gustav. 2009. Psychology of Crowds. Sparkling Books edition. Sparkling Books.
