= Harald Wydra =

British anthropologist

Harald Wydra is a university lecturer in politics at the University of Cambridge and a Fellow of St Catharine's College, Cambridge. His general research interests include political anthropology, symbolic politics, politics of memory, and methodological approaches to the understanding of uncertainty in politics. He is a founding editor-in-chief of the academic journal International Political Anthropology.

Wydra is the author of the 2007 book Communism and the Emergence of Democracy and edited Breaking Boundaries: Varieties of Liminality (Berghahn, Oxford, 2013) with Agnes Horvath and Bjorn Thomassen.
