= 1981 Nobel Prize in Literature =

- Elias Canetti
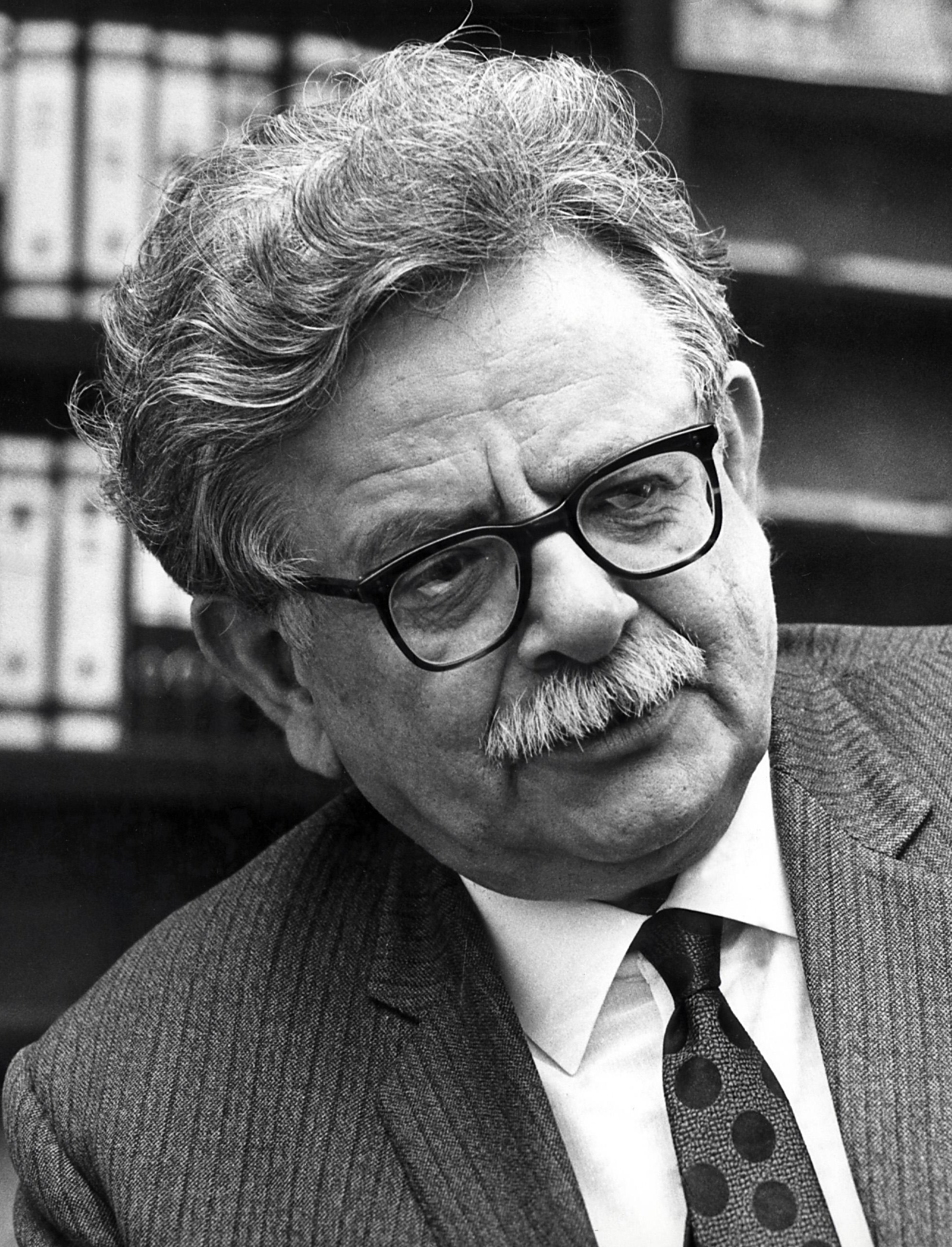
- "for writings marked by a broad outlook, a wealth of ideas and artistic power"
- Date: 15 October 1981 (announcement); 10 December 1981 (ceremony)
- Location: Stockholm, Sweden
- Presented by: Swedish Academy
- First award: 1901
- Website: Official website

The 1981 Nobel Prize in Literature was awarded to the Bulgarian-born British writer Elias Canetti (1905–1994) "for writings marked by a broad outlook, a wealth of ideas and artistic power." Though living in Great Britain since 1938 and became a British citizen in 1952, he wrote primarily in the German language. He is the first native of Bulgaria to win the prize.

== Laureate ==
Elias Canetti's body of literary work includes a novel, three plays, a study of mass movements, some author profiles and memoirs. The 1935 novel Die Blendung ("The Deception") was initially intended to be the first in a series of novels modeled after Honoré de Balzac's The Human Comedy series. Instead of finishing the series, Canetti devoted many years to social studies that resulted to the publication of Masse und Macht ("Crowds and Power", 1960), a psychological study of crowd behavior as it manifests itself in human activities ranging from mob violence to religious congregations. He is also known for his celebrated trilogy of autobiographical memoirs of his childhood and of pre-Anschluss Vienna: Die Gerettete Zunge (The Tongue Set Free, 1979); Die Fackel im Ohr (The Torch in My Ear, 1980), and Das Augenspiel (The Play of the Eyes, 1985).

== Reactions ==
According to the New York Times, Canetti was a controversial choice within the Swedish Academy. Two members of the Academy told Swedish reporters that they were dissatisfied with the prize decision and Canetti's name was disclosed in the Swedish press before the prize announcement. One of the dissatisfied members was reportedly supporting a prize to the American novelist Joyce Carol Oates.
