= Gabriel Tarde =

French sociologist

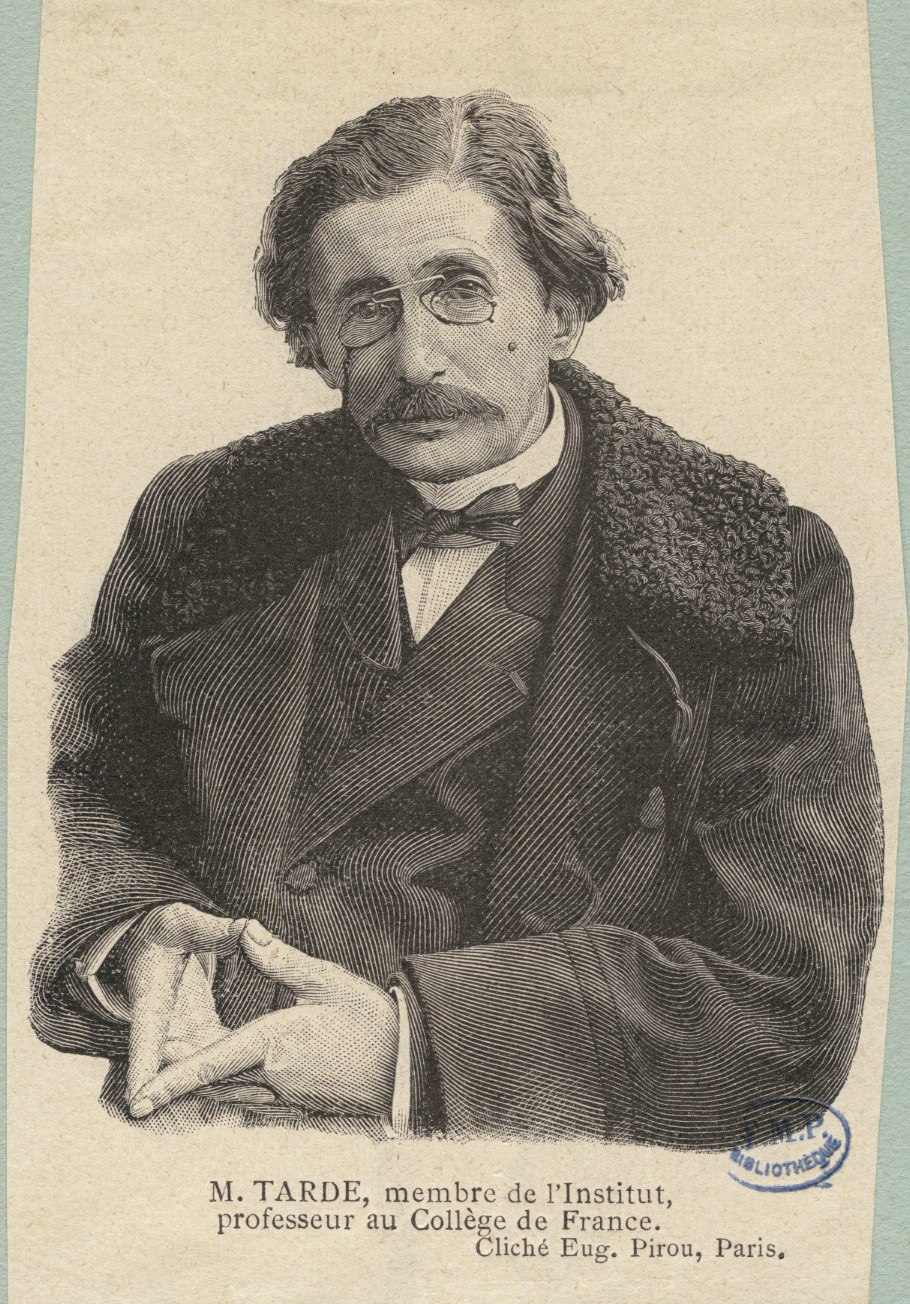
- Portrait by Eugène Pirou
- Born: Jean-Gabriel Tarde; 12 March 1843; Sarlat-la-Canéda, Dordogne, France
- Died: 13 May 1904 (aged 61); Paris, France
- Education: University of Toulouse; University of Paris
- Scientific career
- Fields: Sociologist, criminologist, social psychologist
- Workplaces: Collège de France

Jean-Gabriel (de) Tarde (/tɑːrd/; French: [taʁd]; 12 March 1843 – 13 May 1904) was a French sociologist, criminologist and social psychologist who conceived sociology as based on small psychological interactions among individuals (much as if it were chemistry), the fundamental forces being imitation and innovation.

== Life ==
Tarde was born and raised in Sarlat in the province of Dordogne. He studied law at Toulouse and Paris. From 1869 to 1894 he worked as a magistrate and investigating judge in the province. In the 1880s he corresponded with representatives of the newly formed criminal anthropology, most notably the Italians Enrico Ferri and Cesare Lombroso and the French psychiatrist Alexandre Lacassagne. With the latter, Tarde came to be the leading representative for a "French school" in criminology. In 1900 he was appointed professor in modern philosophy at the Collège de France. As such he was the most prominent contemporary critic of Durkheim's sociology.

== Work ==
Among the concepts that Tarde initiated were the group mind (taken up and developed by Gustave Le Bon, and sometimes advanced to explain so-called herd behaviour or crowd psychology), and economic psychology, where he anticipated a number of modern developments. Tarde was very critical of Émile Durkheim's work at the level of both methodology and theory such as during the Tarde-Durkheim debate in 1903. However, Tarde's insights were ridiculed as "metaphysics" and hastily dismissed by Durkheim and his followers who went on to largely establish the "science" of sociology, and it was not until U.S. scholars, such as the Chicago school, took up his theories that they became famous.

=== Criminology ===
Tarde took an interest in criminology and the psychological basis of criminal behavior while working as a magistrate in public service. He was critical of the concept of the atavistic criminal as developed by Cesare Lombroso. Tarde's criminological studies served as the underpinning of his later sociology.

Tarde also emphasized the tendency of the criminal to return to the scene of the crime and to repeat it, which he saw as part of a wider process of repetition compulsion.

=== Imitation ===
Tarde considered imitation, conscious and unconscious, as a fundamental interpersonal trait, with the imitation of fathers by sons as the primal situation, resting on prestige.

Tarde highlighted the importance of the creative exemplar in society, arguing that "genius is the capacity to engender one's own progeny".

== Science fiction ==
Tarde also wrote a science-fiction novel entitled Underground Man (Fragment d'histoire future, 1896). The plot is a post-apocalyptic story of an Earth destroyed by a new Ice Age. Humanity must rebuild a new civilization underground. The choice is made to lay the foundation of their utopia on music and art.

== Influence ==
- Tarde is mentioned as a prominent influence in Scipio Sighele's pioneering book La Folla delinquente on mass psychology.
- Gustave le Bon's book The Crowd: A Study of the Popular Mind also refers to Tarde as a source.
- Henri Bergson
- Sigmund Freud built on Tarde's ideas of imitation and suggestion for his work on the theory of the crowd, published as Group Psychology and the Analysis of the Ego.
- Everett Rogers furthered Tarde's "laws of imitation" in the 1962 book Diffusion of innovations.
- From the late 1990s and continuing today, Tarde's work has been experiencing a renaissance. Spurred by the re-release of his work Monadologie et Sociologie by Institut Synthelabo under the guidance of Gilles Deleuze's student Eric Alliez, Tarde's work is being re-discovered as a harbinger of postmodern French theory, particularly as influenced by the social philosophers Gilles Deleuze and Félix Guattari.
- It has been argued that Tarde should be recognized as a founding figure of political anthropology, in an article authored by Arpad Szakolczai and Bjørn Thomassen in 2011.

For example, in Difference and Repetition, Deleuze's milestone book which affected his transition to a more socially-aware brand of philosophy and his writing partnership with Guattari, Deleuze in fact re-centered his philosophical orientation around Tarde's thesis that repetition serves difference rather than vice versa. Also on the heels of the re-release of Tarde's works has come an important development in which French sociologist Bruno Latour has referred to Tarde as a possible predecessor to actor–network theory in part because of Tarde's criticisms of Durkheim's conceptions of the Social.

A book, The Social after Gabriel Tarde: Debates and Assessments, edited by Matei Candea, was published by Routledge in 2010. It provides a set of mature critiques of the recent renaissance of Tarde as well as suggesting models for scholars to use Tarde's thought in their scholarship. This book includes contributions that philosophically reflect the Latourian (including a contribution from Latour himself) as well as Deleuzian approaches to Tarde, and also highlight a number of new ways Tarde is being adapted in terms of methods in contemporary sociology, particularly in the area of ethnography, and the study of online communities. Additionally, in 2010, Bruno Latour and Vincent Antonin Lepinay released a short book called The Science of Passionate Interests: An Introduction to Gabriel Tarde's Economic Anthropology, in which they show how Tarde's work offers a strong critique of the foundations of the economics discipline and economic methodology.

Tarde's work has further influenced affect philosophy. For example, in 2012 Tony D Sampson's book Virality: Contagion Theory in the Age of Networks used a Tarde inspired imitation thesis to describe the tendency for emotions, feelings and affects to spread "accidentally" on digital networks.

== Works ==
- La criminalité comparée (1886)
- La philosophie pénale (1890) — translated by Rapelje Howell and published as Penal Philosophy in 1968
- Les lois de l'imitation (1890) — (1903). The Laws of Imitation. Translated by Elsie Clews Parsons (2nd ed.). New York: Henry Holt & Company – via Internet Archive.
- Les transformations du droit. Étude sociologique (1891)
- Monadologie et sociologie (1893)
- La logique sociale (1895)
- Fragment d'histoire future (1896) – translated by Cloudesley Brereton and published as Underground Man in 1905
- L’opposition universelle. Essai d'une théorie des contraires (1897)
- Écrits de psychologie sociale (1898)
- Les lois sociales. Esquisse d'une sociologie (1898) – translated to English by Howard C Warren and published in 1899 as Social Laws - An Outline of Sociology
- L'opinion et la foule (1901)
- La psychologie économique (1902–3)

== See also ==
- Diffusion
- Propaganda
- Public opinion, one of Tarde's key concepts
- Serge Moscovici
