= Arpad Szakolczai =

Sociologist and political anthropologist

Árpád Szakolczai (born 1958) is a Hungarian sociologist and political anthropologist known for his contributions to political anthropology, historical sociology, and the study of liminality, trickster logic, and modernity. He is Emeritus Professor of Sociology at University College Cork and Senior Fellow at the St. Gallen Collegium of the University of St. Gallen (2025–26). He has authored numerous books and articles and has served on several editorial boards and academic panels, including the European Research Council (ERC) panel for Cultures and Cultural Production (SH5) (2011–2018).

== Biography ==
Szakolczai was born and educated in Hungary. He served as a Research Fellow at the Institute of Sociology of the Hungarian Academy of Sciences from 1981 to 1995. He earned his PhD in Economics from the University of Texas at Austin in 1987. In 1989–1990, he was a British Council Fellow at the University of Westminster. Between 1990 and 1998, he taught at the Department of Social and Political Sciences at the European University Institute in Florence, Italy. He joined University College Cork in 1998 as Professor of Sociology, a position he held until 2021, when he became Emeritus Professor.

Szakolczai served as a panel member for the European Research Council (ERC) (SH5: Cultures and Cultural Production) from 2011 to 2018. In 2025–26, he is Senior Fellow at the St. Gallen Collegium at the University of St. Gallen, Switzerland. He is a contributing editor and board member of VoegelinView, a member of the editorial board of the Eric Voegelin Studies Yearbook, and honorary editor of International Political Anthropology.

== Philosophical and/or scholarly view ==
Szakolczai’s scholarship integrates genealogical approaches to historical understanding—drawing on Nietzsche, Weber, Elias, Voegelin, and Foucault—with key concepts from political anthropology, most notably liminality. His work is considered one of the most influential contemporary contributions to the study of liminality, extending the concept far beyond its original anthropological formulation and applying it to modern politics, social theory, and cultural analysis. His analyses of permanent liminality and trickster logic are widely cited and have helped shape interdisciplinary debates on ambiguity, transition, social instability, and political transformation.

Building on this theoretical framework, Szakolczai also incorporates related anthropological concepts such as imitation, gift-giving, participation, and schismogenesis. His work frequently engages classical philosophy— particularly Plato—to examine the structure and pathologies of modern political and social life.

Reflecting on the Tarde—Durkheim debate of 1903, he has argued for renewed recognition of Gabriel Tarde as a foundational figure in political anthropology. He has also critically examined the dominance of Émile Durkheim in sociology, including in the widely referenced 2011 article Gabriel Tarde as Political Anthropologist, co-authored with Bjørn Thomassen.

Influenced by Eric Voegelin and his reading of Husserl’s The Crisis of European Sciences and Transcendental Phenomenology, Szakolczai has contributed to scholarship on the intellectual exchange between Voegelin and Alfred Schütz, especially concerning phenomenology and critiques of rationalism.

His studies of comedy theatre and the modern public sphere include work on the relationship between Richard Wagner and August Röckel during the 1849 Dresden uprising, situating theatrical forms within broader processes of social and political transformation.

== Recognition ==
Szakolczai’s work has been recognised for expanding genealogical historical analysis through anthropological concepts such as liminality, trickster figures, and imitation. His interdisciplinary approach connects political anthropology to classical philosophy, historical sociology, and cultural theory. His reinterpretation of Tarde’s role in political anthropology and critiques of Durkheimian dominance have been influential in sociological debates.

== Published works ==
- Elgar Encyclopedia of Political Anthropology, edited by Árpád Szakolczai and Paul O’Connor (Cheltenham: Edward Elgar, 2025). ISBN 978-1-0353-1048-7
- Political Anthropology as Method (London: Routledge, 2023). ISBN 978-1-032-23002-3
- Post-truth Society: A Political Anthropology of Trickster Logic (London: Routledge, 2022), ISBN 978-1-003-22555-3
- A Political Sociology and Anthropology of Evil: Tricksterology, by Ágnes Horváth and Árpád Szakolczai (London: Routledge, 2020). ISBN 978-1-032-08810-5
- Modern Leaders: In Between Charisma and Trickery, edited by Ágnes Horváth, Árpád Szakolczai and Manussos Marangudakis (London: Routledge, 2020). ISBN 978-0-367-52253-7
- From Anthropology to Social Theory: Rethinking the Social Sciences, by Árpád Szakolczai and Bjørn Thomassen (Cambridge: Cambridge University Press, 2019). ISBN 978-1-108-52942-6
- Walking into the Void: A Historical Sociology and Political Anthropology of Walking, by Ágnes Horváth and Árpád Szakolczai (London: Routledge, 2018). ISBN 978-1-138-21449-1
- The Political Anthropology of Ethnic and Religious Minorities, edited by Árpád Szakolczai, Ágnes Horváth and Attila Z. Papp (London: Routledge, 2018). ISBN 978-0-367-89291-3
- Permanent Liminality and Modernity: Analysing the Sacrificial Carnival through Novels (London: Routledge, 2017). ISBN 978-0-367-18466-7
- Novels and the Sociology of the Contemporary (London: Routledge, 2016). ISBN 978-0-367-87352-3
- Comedy and the Public Sphere: The Re-birth of Theatre as Comedy and the Genealogy of the Modern Public Arena(London: Routledge, 2013). ISBN 978-1-138-92066-8
- Sociology, Religion and Grace: A Quest for the Renaissance (London: Routledge, 2007), xviii + 396 pp.
- La scoperta della società, by Giovanna Procacci and Árpád Szakolczai (Rome: Carocci, 2003).
- The Genesis of Modernity (London: Routledge, 2003). ISBN 978-0-415-86821-1
- Reflexive Historical Sociology (London: Routledge, 2000). ISBN 978-0-415-55862-4
- Identità, riconoscimento e scambio: Saggi in onore di Alessandro Pizzorno, edited by Donatella Della Porta, Monica Greco and Árpád Szakolczai (Rome: Laterza, 2000).
- Max Weber and Michel Foucault: Parallel Life-Works (London: Routledge, 1998). ISBN 978-0-415-86314-8
- The Dissolution of Communist Power: The Case of Hungary, by Ágnes Horváth and Árpád Szakolczai (London: Routledge, 1992). ISBN 978-0-415-06709-6

== See also ==
Hungarian sociologists

Political anthropology

Modern anthropology

Academic Staff of University College Cork

European University Institute

Liminality

Trickster
