= Veza Canetti =

Austrian translator and writer

Venetiana "Veza" Taubner-Calderon Canetti (1897 in Vienna – 1963 in London) was an Austrian novelist, playwright, and short story writer. Her works – including singular short stories published in the Viennese Arbeiter Zeitung and other socialist outlets – were only published under her own name posthumously. She preferred pseudonyms, as was common at the time for left-wing or satirical authors, her favourite being Veza Magd (or Maid). The Tortoises (Die Schildkröten) which is set at the time of the Kristallnacht in 1938 remains her only known published novel. Her husband and Nobel Prize in Literature laureate Elias Canetti further posthumously declared her to be co-author of his Crowds and Power. She was also a translator of Wolf Solent by John Cowper Powys (Zsolnay, 1930), though the named translator is Richard Hoffmann who owned the agency where she freelanced, and three books by Upton Sinclair for the Malik Verlag (1930-32), where the named translator is once again male, this time her partner and future husband, Elias Canetti.

== Biography ==
Venetiana "Veza" Taubner-Calderon was born in Vienna, Austria, in 1897 into a Sephardi-Jewish family. After World War I, she initially worked as an English teacher. At the age of 26 she met Elias Canetti, whom she would later marry in February 1934.

During the 1930s, she wrote short stories based on everyday life for the Viennese paper Arbeiter-Zeitung. 'Patience brings Roses' was included in a Malik anthology in 1932 edited by Wieland Herzfelde, Dreissig Neue Erzähler des Neuen Deutschland. Junge deutsche Prosa. The reissue of this volume in the GDR fifty years later eventually led to her rediscovery by Helmut Göbel. After the defeat of Red Vienna in February 1934, it became increasingly difficult for her to publish. Tortoises draws from her time in Anschluss-Austria in 1938 and was written in exile in London and initially accepted by Hutchinson before the outbreak of war led the publishers to cancel the contract. It was only many years after her death that the publication of Yellow Street in 1990 led to her rediscovery. Her fiction was often political, usually witty and dialectical, grotesque, and partly autobiographical.

== Works in English Translation ==
- The Tortoises (Die Schildkröten)
- Yellow Street (Die gelbe Straße)
- The Ogre (Der Oger), published in Anthology of Austrian Folkplays, trans. Richard Dixon (Riverside, CA: Ariadne, 1993)
- Patience Brings Roses (Geduld bringt Rosen), published in Viennese Short Stories, trans. Julian Preece (Riverside, CA: Ariadne, 2006)
- "dearest Georg": Love, Literature, and Power in Dark Times: The Letters of Elias, Veza, and Georges Canetti, 1933-1948 (New York: Other Press, 2010), edited by Karen Lauer and Kristian Wachinger, trans. David Dollenmayer

== See also ==
- List of Austrian writers
