= Political anthropology =

Comparative study of group decisions

Political anthropology is the comparative study of politics in a broad range of historical, social, and cultural settings.

== History of political anthropology ==
=== Origins ===
Political anthropology has its roots in the 19th century. At that time, thinkers such as Lewis H. Morgan and Sir Henry Maine tried to trace the evolution of human society from 'primitive' or 'savage' societies to more 'advanced' ones. These early approaches were ethnocentric, speculative, and often racist. Nevertheless, they laid the basis for political anthropology by undertaking a modern study inspired by modern science, especially the approaches espoused by Charles Darwin. In a move that would be influential for future anthropology, this early work focused on kinship as the key to understanding political organization, and emphasized the role of the 'gens' or lineage as an object of study.

Among the principal architects of modern social science are French sociologist Emile Durkheim, German sociologist, jurist, and political economist Max Weber, and German political philosopher, journalist, and economist Karl Marx.

Political anthropology's contemporary literature can be traced to the 1940 publication African Political Systems, edited by Meyer Fortes and E. E. Evans-Pritchard. They rejected the speculative historical reconstruction of earlier authors and argued that "a scientific study of political institutions must be inductive and comparative and aim solely at establishing and explaining the uniformities found among them and their interdependencies with other features of social organization". Their goal was taxonomy: to classify societies into a small number of discrete categories, and then compare them in order to make generalizations about them. The contributors of this book were influenced by Radcliffe-Brown and structural functionalism. As a result, they assumed that all societies were well-defined entities which sought to maintain their equilibrium and social order. Although the authors recognized that "Most of these societies have been conquered or have submitted to European rule from fear of invasion. They would not acquiesce in it if the threat of force were withdrawn; and this fact determines the part now played in their political life by European administration" the authors in the volume tended in practice to examine African political systems in terms of their own internal structures, and ignored the broader historical and political context of colonialism.

Several authors reacted to this early work. In his work Political Systems of Highland Burma (1954) Edmund Leach argued that it was necessary to understand how societies changed through time rather than remaining static and in equilibrium. A special version of conflict oriented political anthropology was developed in the so-called 'Manchester school', started by Max Gluckman. Gluckman focused on social process and an analysis of structures and systems based on their relative stability. In his view, conflict maintained the stability of political systems through the establishment and re-establishment of crosscutting ties among social actors. Gluckman even suggested that a certain degree of conflict was necessary to uphold society, and that conflict was constitutive of social and political order.

By the 1960s this transition work developed into a full-fledged subdiscipline which was canonized in volumes such as Political Anthropology (1966) edited by Victor Turner and Marc Swartz. By the late 1960s, political anthropology was a flourishing subfield: in 1969 there were two hundred anthropologists listing the subdiscipline as one of their areas of interest, and a quarter of all British anthropologists listed politics as a topic that they studied.

Political anthropology developed in a very different way in the United States. There, authors such as Morton Fried, Elman Service, and Eleanor Leacock took a Marxist approach and sought to understand the origins and development of inequality in human society. Marx and Engels had drawn on the ethnographic work of Morgan, and these authors now extended that tradition. In particular, they were interested in the evolution of social systems over time.

From the 1960s a 'process approach' developed, stressing the role of agents (Bailey 1969; Barth 1969). It was a meaningful development as anthropologists started to work in situations where the colonial system was dismantling. The focus on conflict and social reproduction was carried over into Marxist approaches that came to dominate French political anthropology from the 1960s. Pierre Bourdieu's work on the Kabyle (1977) was strongly inspired by this development, and his early work was a marriage between French post-structuralism, Marxism and process approach.

Interest in anthropology grew in the 1970s. A session on anthropology was organized at the Ninth International Congress of Anthropological and Ethnological Sciences in 1973, the proceedings of which were eventually published in 1979 as Political Anthropology: The State of the Art. A newsletter was created shortly thereafter, which developed over time into the journal PoLAR: Political and Legal Anthropology Review.

In the 21st century, a group of scholars associated with the Journal of International Political Anthropology developed a broad, interdisciplinary interpretation of political anthropology aimed at exploring the anthropological foundations of politics, sometimes described as the “pre-political”. This line of research has been developed in a number of publications, including works in the Routledge Contemporary Liminality series. It culminated in the Encyclopedia of Political Anthropology edited by Arpad Szakolczai and Paul O’Connor. It has been suggested that such approaches respond to a growing need to revisit the deeper anthropological and symbolic foundations of politics in order to better understand contemporary political uncertainty and the cultural dynamics underlying modern political life. Such an understanding of Political Anthropology looks beyond modernity in order to deepen the self-understanding of modernity. This approach relies on the main concepts of maverick anthropologists like Arnold van Gennep, Victor Turner, Paul Radin, René Girard, or Gregory Bateson, among others, such as liminality, trickster, imitation, or schismogenesis. It also incorporates classical philosophical anthropology, especially Plato, and the main genealogists of modernity, Nietzsche, Weber and Foucault, while also drawing on archaeology and comparative mythology. The work of mythologists like Georges Dumézil (on Loki) and Carl Kerényi (on Hermes and Prometheus) is central for understanding the trickster, helping to read modern political movements and figures as ’tricksters’, complementing Max Weber’s political sociology of “charisma”, while archaeological evidence helps to spot the presence of trickster figures in the distant past.

=== Anthropology concerned with states and their institutions ===
While for a whole century (1860 to 1960 roughly) political anthropology developed as a discipline concerned primarily with politics in stateless societies, a new development started from the 1960s, and is still unfolding: anthropologists started increasingly to study more "complex" social settings in which the presence of states, bureaucracies and markets entered both ethnographic accounts and analysis of local phenomena. This was not the result of a sudden development or any sudden "discovery" of contextuality. From the 1950s anthropologists who studied peasant societies in Latin America and Asia, had increasingly started to incorporate their local setting (the village) into its larger context, as in Redfield's famous distinction between 'small' and 'big' traditions (Redfield 1941). The 1970s also witnessed the emergence of Europe as a category of anthropological investigation. Boissevain's essay, "towards an anthropology of Europe" (Boissevain and Friedl 1975) was perhaps the first systematic attempt to launch a comparative study of cultural forms in Europe; an anthropology not only carried out in Europe, but an anthropology of Europe.

The turn toward the study of complex society made anthropology inherently more political. First, it was no longer possible to carry out fieldwork in say, Spain, Algeria or India without taking into account the way in which all aspects of local society were tied to state and market. It is true that early ethnographies in Europe had sometimes done just that: carried out fieldwork in villages of Southern Europe, as if they were isolated units or 'islands'. However, from the 1970s that tendency was openly criticised, and Jeremy Boissevain (Boissevain and Friedl 1975) said it most clearly: anthropologists had "tribalised Europe" and if they wanted to produce relevant ethnography they could no longer afford to do so. Contrary to what is often heard from colleagues in the political and social sciences, anthropologists have for nearly half a century been very careful to link their ethnographic focus to wider social, economic and political structures. This does not mean to abandon an ethnographic focus on very local phenomena, the care for detail.

In a more direct way, the turn towards complex society also signified that political themes increasingly were taken up as the main focus of study, and at two main levels. First of all, anthropologists continued to study political organization and political phenomena that lay outside the state-regulated sphere (as in patron-client relations or tribal political organization). Second of all, anthropologists slowly started to develop a disciplinary concern with states and their institutions (and on the relationship between formal and informal political institutions). An anthropology of the state developed, and it is a most thriving field today. Geertz's comparative work on the Balinese state is an early, famous example. There is today a rich canon of anthropological studies of the state (see for example Abeles 1990). Hastings Donnan, Thomas Wilson and others started in the early 1990s a productive subfield, an "anthropology of borders", which addresses the ways in which state borders affect local populations, and how people from border areas shape and direct state discourse and state formation (see for example Alvarez, 1996; Thomassen, 1996; Vereni, 1996; Donnan and Wilson, 1994; 1999; 2003).

From the 1980s a heavy focus on ethnicity and nationalism developed. 'Identity' and 'identity politics' soon became defining themes of the discipline, partially replacing earlier focus on kinship and social organization. This made anthropology even more obviously political. Nationalism is to some extent simply state-produced culture, and to be studied as such. And ethnicity is to some extent simply the political organization of cultural difference (Barth 1969). Benedict Anderson's book Imagined Communities: Reflections on the Origin and Spread of Nationalism discusses why nationalism came into being. He sees the invention of the printing press as the main spark, enabling shared national emotions, characteristics, events and history to be imagined through common readership of newspapers.

The interest in cultural/political identity construction also went beyond the nation-state dimension. By now, several ethnographies have been carried out in the international organizations (like the EU) studying the fonctionnaires as a cultural group with special codes of conduct, dressing, interaction etc. (Abélès, 1992; Wright, 1994; Bellier, 1995; Zabusky, 1995; MacDonald, 1996; Rhodes, 't Hart, and Noordegraaf, 2007). Increasingly, anthropological fieldwork is today carried out inside bureaucratic structures or in companies. And bureaucracy can in fact only be studied by living in it – it is far from the rational system we and the practitioners like to think, as Weber himself had indeed pointed out long ago (Herzfeld 1992).

The concern with political institutions has also fostered a focus on institutionally driven political agency. There is now an anthropology of policy making (Shore and Wright 1997). This focus has been most evident in Development anthropology or the anthropology of development, which over the last decades has established as one of the discipline's largest subfields. Political actors like states, governmental institutions, NGOs, International Organizations or business corporations are here the primary subjects of analysis. In their ethnographic work anthropologists have cast a critical eye on discourses and practices produced by institutional agents of development in their encounter with 'local culture' (see for example Ferguson 1994). Development anthropology is tied to global political economy and economic anthropology as it concerns the management and redistribution of both ideational and real resources (see for example Hart 1982). In this vein, Escobar (1995) famously argued that international development largely helped to reproduce the former colonial power structures.

Many other themes have over the last two decades been opened up which, taken together, are making anthropology increasingly political: post-colonialism, post-communism, gender, multiculturalism, migration, citizenship, not to forget the umbrella term of globalization. It thus makes sense to say that while anthropology was always to some extent about politics, this is even more evidently the case today.

== Notable political anthropologists ==
Some notable political anthropologists include:

- Marc Abélès
- F. G. Bailey
- Georges Balandier
- Jeremy Boissevain
- John Borneman
- Robert L. Carneiro
- Pierre Clastres
- E. E. Evans-Pritchard
- Meyer Fortes
- David Graeber
- Agnes Horvath
- Dolly Kikon
- Ted C. Lewellen
- Carolyn Nordstrom
- James C. Scott
- Audra Simpson
- Arpad Szakolczai
- Bjørn Thomassen
- Joan Vincent
- Harald Wydra

== See also ==
- Indigenous law
- Political sociology
- Legal anthropology
