= Auto-da-Fé (novel) =

1935 novel by Elias Canetti

- 1st English language edition, 1946
- Author: Elias Canetti
- Original title: Die Blendung
- Translator: C. V. Wedgwood
- Language: German
- Published: 1935 (Herbert Reichner) (German); 1946 (Jonathan Cape) (English)
- Publication place: Austria
- Media type: Print
- Pages: 464

Auto-da-Fé (original title Die Blendung, "The Blinding") is a 1935 novel by Elias Canetti. The novel explores the descent of a book-obsessive academic into madness. It was translated into English in 1946 by C. V. Wedgwood. The first American edition of Wedgwood's translation, published in 1947, was titled The Tower of Babel. Auto-da-fé refers to the burning of heretics by the Inquisition.

== Publication history ==
The book manuscript was finished in 1931, and the book was published in 1935, by Herbert Reichner in Vienna (Canetti's home at that time). It is Canetti's first publication.

In 1943 Canetti received an offer to publish the book in English with Jonathan Cape, but it was decided to delay publication until after the war. It was released by Jonathan Cape in 1946 and, as The Tower of Babel, by Alfred A. Knopf in 1947. The book did not become widely known until after the worldwide success of Canetti's Crowds and Power (1960). Jonathan Spence observes that "there is nothing discreet, chaste, or high minded about the finest and wildest of all fictions that centre on a student of China, Canetti's Auto-da-fe."

== Plot and themes ==
The novel is a dark and disorienting tale of the self-destructive character of totalitarian thinking. On 24 May 1946, Kate O'Brien for The Spectator described it as "Appalling, magnificent.... [It] screams and bellows of evil, out of which a supremely mad, unfaceable book is orchestrated ... of which we dare not deny the genius."

The protagonist is Herr Doktor Peter Kien, a famed and famously reclusive forty-year-old philologist and Sinologist who is uninterested in human interaction or sex, content with his monkish, highly disciplined life in his book-lined apartment in Vienna. He uses the least amount of furniture possible, to make room for his pacing through his lofty rooms, sleeping on a small divan. He holds books at a higher value than human life, and becomes obsessed with the protection of his library, which he fancies the largest private library in the city:

He himself was the owner of the most important private library in the whole of this great city. He carried a minute portion of it with him wherever he went. His passion for it, the only one which he had permitted himself during a life of austere and exacting study, moved him to take special precautions. Books, even bad ones, tempted him easily into making a purchase. Fortunately, the greater number of the book shops did not open until after eight o'clock.

Kien categorically rejects the ignominiousness and immorality of working for money, and has been living on an inheritance from his father for over a decade. He publishes an article or two every few years, to the delight of the larger European academic community. He is constantly prevailed upon to accept various academic posts, but is absorbed in his studies and shuns social and physical contacts. He is obsessive-compulsive in his efforts to avoid contamination, and much of the book is a tortured comedy of his descent into madness and being thrown into close contact with a world that he doesn't understand: "You draw closer to truth by shutting yourself off from mankind".

The novel begins with a conversation between Kien and a schoolboy in the street, who shows keen interest in Chinese texts. Kien consequently invites the boy to see his library. He immediately regrets the invitation and when the boy comes, Kien's housekeeper, Therese Krumbholz (crooked wood) boots the boy out of the apartment. Kien is grateful to her and admires such staunch enforcement of the rules surrounding his library. She shows interest in learning, and he begrudgingly lends her the most beat up book in his collection, believing she would defile the nicer editions. When he sees that she treats it with greater deference even than he, he decides to marry her, imagining that his library is in very good hands. On the way home from the marriage ceremony, Kien, a virgin, has brief but intense fantasies about consummating the marriage, revealing his ignorance of sex as well as disturbing ideas about women:

But Kien was surreptitiously contemplating the skirt.... Her skirt was a part of her, as the mussel shell is a part of the mussel.... They have to be trodden on, to be trampled into slime and splinters, as he had done once when he was a child at the seaside.... He had never seen one naked. What kind of animal did the shell enclose with such impenetrable strength? He wanted to know, at once: he had the hard, stiff-necked thing between his hands, he tortured it with fingers and finger-nails; the mussel tortured him back.... Soon he had the creature stark naked on the ground, a miserable fleck of fraudulent slime, not an animal at all.

Kien's comparison of Therese's skirt with a mussel shell is one of the first shocking psychological revelations in the book. But when Therese arrives in a thin white slip, she thrusts the books onto the floor to make room. Kien runs to lock himself in the bathroom and weeps bitterly, for the abuse of the books (as well as his having been wrong about Therese, presumably; Canetti, 59).

Thus begins Kien's steep psychological decline. Within days of marriage, the two enter a violent and divided existence, and Kien becomes deeply agitated when cut off from three-quarters of his library to accommodate a separate living space for his bride. After a violent encounter with her, the building's concierge, Benedikt Pfaff (an ex-policeman), offers to beat her to death (Canetti, 111–112). Therese ultimately forces Kien out entirely. He is deeply bereaved, since to him the books are more important than people:

Books have no life; they lack feeling maybe, and perhaps cannot feel pain, as animals and even plants feel pain. But what proof have we that inorganic objects can feel no pain? Who knows if a book may not yearn for other books, its companions of many years, in some way strange to us and therefore never yet perceived?

The rest of the book is a disturbing series of interconnected incidents of violence and mental, social and sexual depravity. Each character is driven entirely by a desperate need for one thing (being chess champion, having a library, being rich, etc), to the point of entering into a state of war against anything that might remotely stand in the way of its realization. In a way, each character represents the totalitarian mindset, always to their bitter undoing. Every character seems to present a type of insanity, with the exception of Georges Kien, who in fact venerates insanity, to the point of regarding it as superior, even holy (Canetti, 401–405). It is this very man who appears to be coming to save his brother and sort out the mess of Therese and Pfaff, but arrogantly underestimates the depth of Peter's disease, and so fails to prevent the ultimate catastrophe.

Kien descends to the criminal underbelly of Vienna, befriending a dwarf named Fischerle, who dreams of defrauding Kien and travelling to America to become chess champion. Fischerle ends up sending a telegram to Kien's brother, Georges, a famous psychiatrist in Paris. Georges tries in vain to cure him, perhaps reflective of the author's antagonistic stance toward Freudian psychoanalysis. Canetti's friend, the sculptor Fritz Wotruba, felt that the character was modelled on Canetti's brother Nessim, who at the time lived in France, worked for Polydor Records and was an impresario for French chanson through the nightclub he ran there. "Hadn't I, he asked me, gone wrong out of love for my younger brother, whom I had told him about? No one, he insisted, could have so many skins; I had constructed an ideal character; what a writer does in his books, Georges Kien did in his life ...".

Ultimately, his marriage—intended to protect both himself and his library—destroys both instead, in the conflagration alluded to by the English-language title, Auto-da-Fé.

== Bibliography ==
- Canetti, Elias, "Auto-da-Fé", trans. C. V. Wedgwood. London: Jonathan Cape 1946
- Donahue, William Collins, The End of Modernism: Elias Canetti’s Auto-da-Fé. Chapel Hill, North Carolina: University of North Carolina Press, 2001
