= Jeremy Boissevain =

Dutch anthropologist (1928–2015)

Jeremy Fergus Boissevain (5 August 1928 – 26 June 2015) was a Dutch anthropologist. He was Emeritus Professor of Social Anthropology at the Amsterdam School for Social Science Research, University of Amsterdam.

== Academic background ==
Boissevain was awarded his PhD in 1962 from the London School of Economics. He was professor of Anthropology at the University of Amsterdam continually from 1966 to 1993, and also taught at the Universities of Montreal, Sussex, Malta, New York (Stony Brook), Massachusetts (Amherst), Columbia University and the Jagiellonian University in Kraków.

== History ==
Boissevain first came to Malta in September 1961, and wrote his doctoral thesis – later published as "Saints and Fireworks – Religion and Politics in Rural Malta" – in the summer of 1962.

== Bibliography ==
- Saints and Fireworks: Religion and Politics in Rural Malta (1965, 1993)
- Hal Kirkop: A Village in Malta (1969)
- The Italians of Montreal (1970)
- Network Analysis (editor, 1973)
- Friends of Friends: Networks, Manipulators and Coalitions (1974)
- Beyond the Community (editor, 1975)
- Ethnic Challenge (editor, 1984)
- Dutch Dilemmas: Anthropologists Look at the Netherlands (editor, 1989)
- Revitalizing European Rituals (editor, 1992)
- Coping with Tourists: European Reactions to Mass Tourism (1996)
- Factions, Friends and Feasts: Anthropological Perspectives on the Mediterranean (2013)

== See also ==
- Political anthropology
