= Gustave Le Bon =

French psychologist (1841–1931)

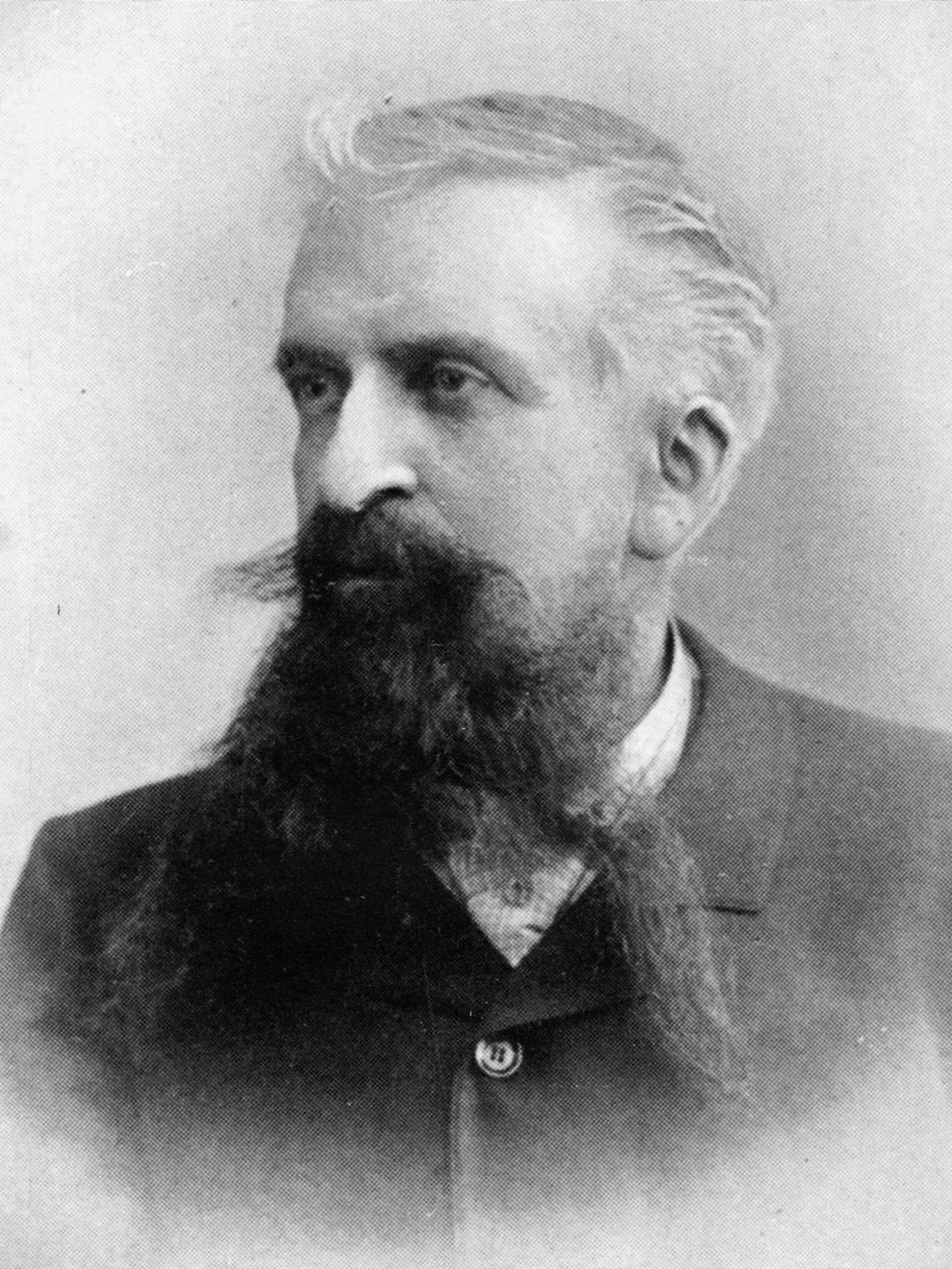
- Le Bon, c. 1900
- Born: Charles-Marie-Gustave Le Bon; 7 May 1841; Nogent-le-Rotrou, France
- Died: 13 December 1931 (aged 90); Marnes-la-Coquette, France
- Resting place: Père Lachaise Cemetery
- Education: University of Paris (M.D.)
- Known for: The Crowd: A Study of the Popular Mind; Crowd psychology
- Scientific career
- Fields: Anthropology, psychology, sociology, medicine, engineering, physics
- Academic advisors: Pierre Adolphe Piorry

Charles-Marie Gustave Le Bon (Note: /ləˈbɒ̃/; French: [ɡystav lə bɔ̃]) (7 May 1841 – 13 December 1931) was a leading French polymath whose areas of interest included anthropology, psychology, sociology, medicine, invention, and physics. He is best known for his 1895 work The Crowd: A Study of the Popular Mind, which is considered one of the seminal works of crowd psychology.

A native of Nogent-le-Rotrou, Le Bon qualified as a doctor of medicine at the University of Paris in 1866. He opted against the formal practice of medicine as a physician, instead beginning his writing career the same year of his graduation. He published a number of medical articles and books before joining the French Army after the outbreak of the Franco-Prussian War. Defeat in the war coupled with being a first-hand witness to the Paris Commune of 1871 strongly shaped Le Bon's worldview. He then travelled widely, touring Europe, Asia and North Africa. He analysed the peoples and the civilisations he encountered under the umbrella of the nascent field of anthropology, developing an essentialist view of humanity, and invented a portable cephalometer during his travels.

In the 1890s, he turned to psychology and sociology, in which fields he released his most successful works. Le Bon developed the view that crowds are not the sum of their individual parts, proposing that within crowds there forms a new psychological entity, the characteristics of which are determined by the "racial unconscious" of the crowd. At the same time he created his psychological and sociological theories, he performed experiments in physics and published popular books on the subject, anticipating the mass–energy equivalence and prophesising the Atomic Age. Le Bon maintained his eclectic interests up until his death in 1931.

Ignored or maligned by sections of the French academic and scientific establishment during his life due to his politically conservative and reactionary views, Le Bon was critical of majoritarianism and socialism.

== Biography ==
=== Youth ===
Charles-Marie Gustave Le Bon was born in Nogent-le-Rotrou, Centre-Val de Loire on 7 May 1841 to a family of Breton ancestry. At the time of Le Bon's birth, his mother, Annette Josephine Eugénic Tétiot Desmarlinais, was twenty-six and his father, Jean-Marie Charles Le Bon, was forty-one and a provincial functionary of the French government. Le Bon was a direct descendant of Jean-Odet Carnot, whose grandfather, Jean Carnot, had a brother, Denys, from whom the fifth president of the French Third Republic, Marie François Sadi Carnot, was directly descended.

When Le Bon was eight years old, his father obtained a new post in French government and the family, including Gustave's younger brother Georges, left Nogent-le-Rotrou never to return. Nonetheless, the town was proud that Gustave Le Bon was born there and later named a street after him. Little else is known of Le Bon's childhood, except for his attendance at a lycée in Tours, where he was an unexceptional student.

In 1860, he began medicinal studies at the University of Paris. He completed his internship at Hôtel-Dieu de Paris, and received his doctorate in 1866. From that time on, he referred to himself as "Doctor" though he never formally worked as a physician. During his university years, Le Bon wrote articles on a range of medical topics, the first of which related to the maladies that plagued those who lived in swamp-like conditions. He published several other about loa loa filariasis and asphyxia before releasing his first full-length book in 1866, De la mort apparente et des inhumations prématurées. This work dealt with the definition of death, preceding 20th-century legal debates on the issue.

=== Life in Paris ===
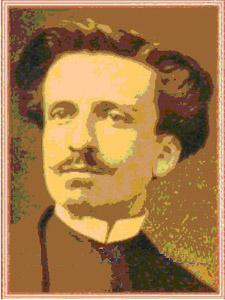
Portrait of Gustave Le Bon, c. 1870

After his graduation, Le Bon remained in Paris, where he taught himself English and German by reading William Shakespeare's works in each language. He maintained his passion for writing and authored several papers on physiological studies, as well as an 1868 textbook about sexual reproduction, before joining the French Army as a medical officer after the outbreak of the Franco-Prussian War in July 1870. During the war, Le Bon organised a division of military ambulances. In that capacity, he observed the behaviour of the military under the worst possible condition—total defeat, and wrote about his reflections on military discipline, leadership and the behaviour of man in a state of stress and suffering. These reflections garnered praise from generals, and were later studied at Saint-Cyr and other military academies in France. At the end of the war, Le Bon was named a Chevalier of the Legion of Honour.

Le Bon also witnessed the Paris Commune of 1871, which deeply affected his worldview. The then thirty-year-old Le Bon looked on as Parisian revolutionary crowds burned down the Tuileries Palace, the library of the Louvre, the Hôtel de Ville, the Gobelins Manufactory, the Palais de Justice, and other irreplaceable works of architectural art.

From 1871 on, Le Bon was an avowed opponent of socialist pacifists and protectionists, who he believed were halting France's martial development and stifling her industrial growth; stating in 1913: "Only people with lots of cannons have the right to be pacifists." He also warned his countrymen of the deleterious effects of political rivalries in the face of German military might and rapid industrialisation, and therefore was uninvolved in the Dreyfus Affair which dichotomised France.

=== Widespread travels ===
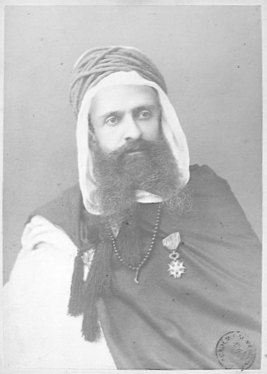
Le Bon in Algiers, 1880

Le Bon became interested in the emerging field of anthropology in the 1870s and travelled throughout Europe, Asia and North Africa. Influenced by Charles Darwin, Herbert Spencer and Ernst Haeckel, Le Bon supported biological determinism and a hierarchical view of the races and sexes; after extensive field research, he posited a correlation between cranial capacity and intelligence in Recherches anatomiques et mathématiques sur les variations de volume du cerveau et sur leurs relations avec l'intelligence (1879), which earned him the Godard Prize from the French Academy of Sciences. During his research, he invented a portable cephalometer to aid with measuring the physical characteristics of remote peoples, and in 1881 published a paper, "The Pocket Cephalometer, or Compass of Coordinates", detailing his invention and its application.

In 1884, he was commissioned by the French government to travel around Asia and report on the civilisations there. The results of his journeys were a number of books, and a development in Le Bon's thinking to also view culture to be influenced chiefly by hereditary factors such as the unique racial features of the people. The first book, entitled La Civilisation des Arabes, was released in 1884. In this, Le Bon praised Arabs highly for their contributions to civilisation, but criticised Islamism as an agent of stagnation. He also described their culture as superior to that of the Turks who governed them, and translations of this work were inspirational to early Arab nationalists. He followed this with a trip to Nepal, becoming the first Frenchman to visit the country, and released Voyage au Népal in 1886.

He next published Les Civilisations de l'Inde (1887), in which he applauded Indian architecture, art and religion but argued that Indians were comparatively inferior to Europeans in regard to scientific advancements, and that this had facilitated British domination. In 1889, he released Les Premières Civilisations de l'Orient, giving in it an overview of the Mesopotamian, Indian, Chinese and Egyptian civilisations. The same year, he delivered a speech to the International Colonial Congress criticising colonial policies which included attempts of cultural assimilation, stating: "Leave to the natives their customs, their institutions and their laws." Le Bon released the last book on the topic of his travels, entitled Les monuments de l'Inde, in 1893, again praising the architectural achievements of the Indian people.

=== Development of theories ===
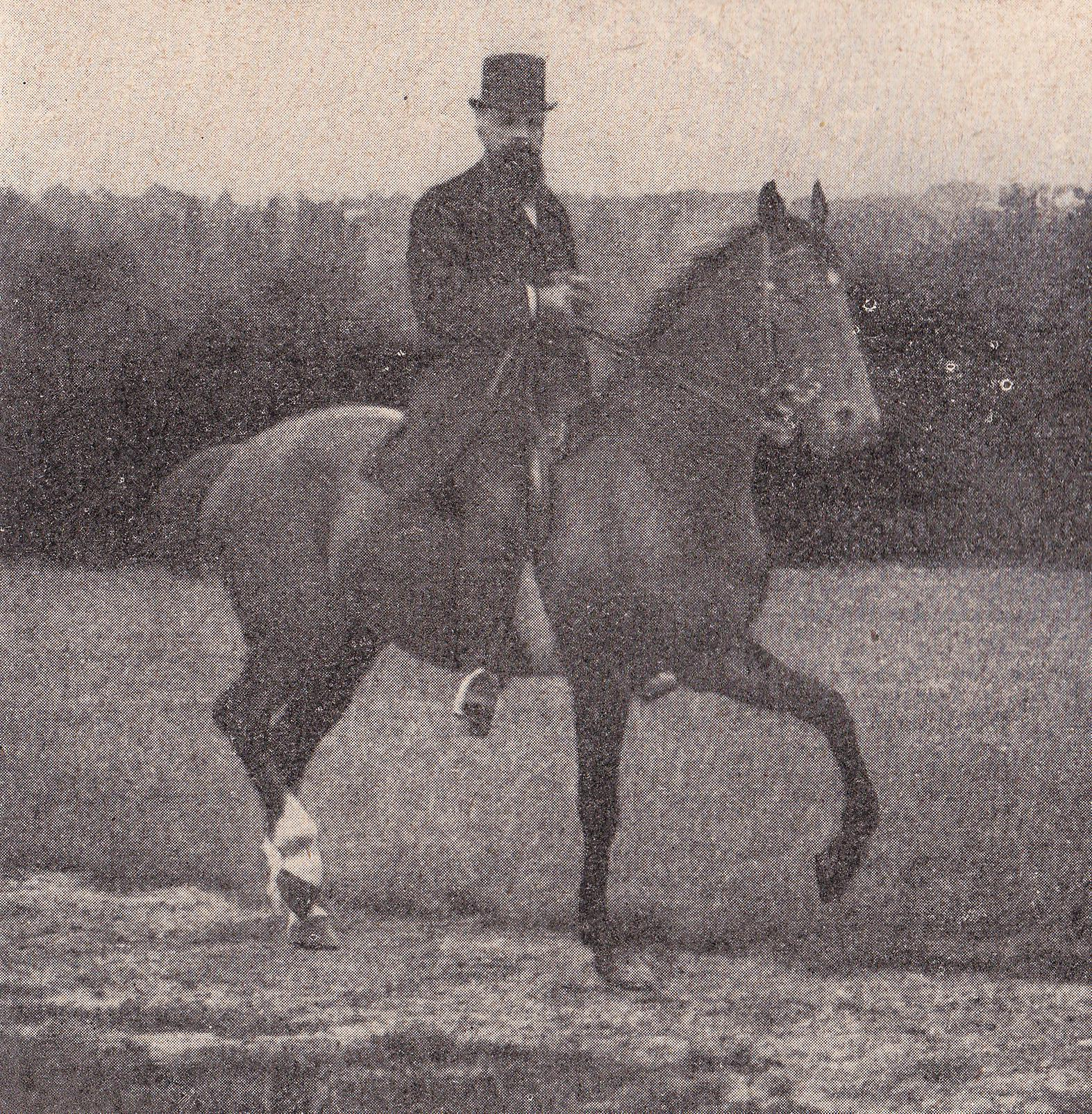
Gustave Le Bon on horseback, c. 1895

On his travels, Le Bon travelled largely on horseback and noticed that techniques used by horse breeders and trainers varied dependent on the region. He returned to Paris and in 1892, while riding a high-spirited horse, he was bucked off and narrowly escaped death. He was unsure as to what caused him to be thrown off the horse, and decided to begin a study of what he had done wrong as a rider. The result of his study was L'Équitation actuelle et ses principes. Recherches expérimentales (1892), which consisted of numerous photographs of horses in action combined with analysis by Le Bon. This work became a respected cavalry manual, and Le Bon extrapolated his studies on the behaviour of horses to develop theories on early childhood education.

Le Bon's behavioural study of horses also sparked a long-standing interest in psychology, and in 1894 he released Lois psychologiques de l'évolution des peuples. This work was dedicated to his friend Charles Richet though it drew much from the theories of Théodule-Armand Ribot, to whom Le Bon dedicated Psychologie des Foules (1895). Psychologie des Foules was in part a summation of Le Bon's 1881 work, L'Homme et les sociétés, to which Émile Durkheim referred in his doctoral dissertation, De la division du travail social.

Both were best-sellers, with Psychologie des Foules being translated into nineteen languages within one year of its appearance. Le Bon followed these with two more books on psychology, Psychologie du Socialisme and Psychologie de l'Éducation, in 1896 and 1902 respectively. These works rankled the largely socialist academic establishment of France.

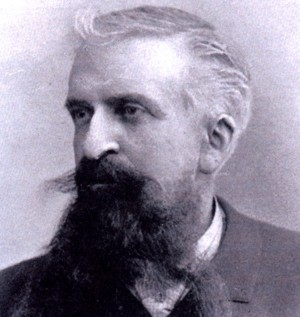
Gustave Le Bon, c. 1900

Le Bon constructed a home laboratory in the early 1890s, and in 1896 reported observing "black light", a new kind of radiation that he believed was distinct from, but possibly related to, X-rays and cathode rays. Not the same type of radiation as what is now known as black light, its existence was never confirmed and, similar to N rays, it is now generally understood to be non-existent, but the discovery claim attracted much attention among French scientists at the time, many of whom supported it and Le Bon's general ideas on matter and radiation, and he was even nominated for the Nobel Prize in Physics in 1903.

In 1902, Le Bon began a series of weekly luncheons to which he invited prominent intellectuals, nobles and ladies of fashion. The strength of his personal networks is apparent from the guest list: participants included cousins Henri and Raymond Poincaré, Paul Valéry, Alexander Izvolsky, Henri Bergson, Marcellin Berthelot and Aristide Briand.

In L'Évolution de la Matière (1905), Le Bon anticipated the mass–energy equivalence, and in a 1922 letter to Albert Einstein complained about his lack of recognition. Einstein responded and conceded that a mass–energy equivalence had been proposed before him, but only the theory of relativity had cogently proved it. Gaston Moch gave Le Bon credit for anticipating Einstein's theory of relativity. In L'Évolution des Forces (1907), Le Bon prophesied the Atomic Age. He wrote about "the manifestation of a new force—namely intra-atomic energy—which surpasses all others by its colossal magnitude," and stated that a scientist who discovered a way to dissociate rapidly one gram of any metal would "not witness the results of his experiments ... the explosion produced would be so formidable that his laboratory and all neighbouring houses, with their inhabitants, would be instantaneously pulverised."

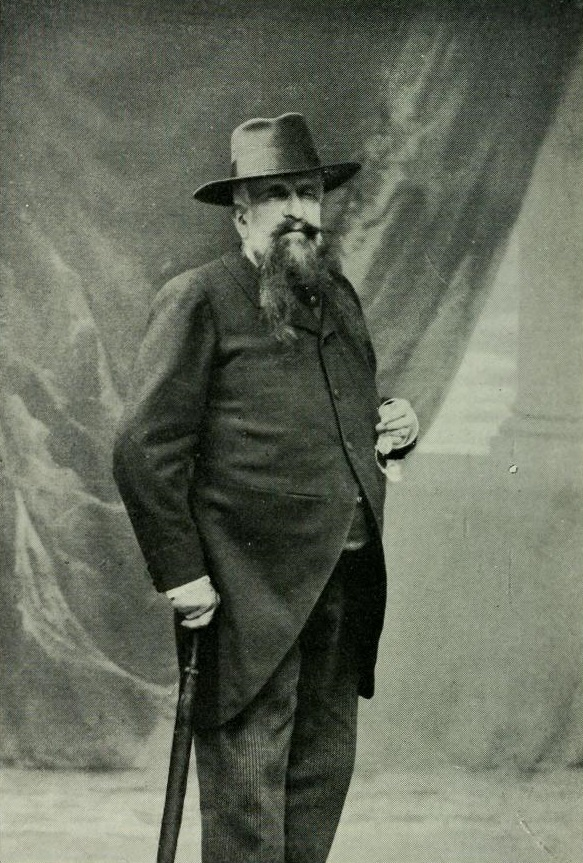
Doctor Gustave Le Bon, 1914

Le Bon discontinued his research in physics in 1908, and turned again to psychology. He released La Psychologie politique et la défense sociale, Les Opinions et les croyances, La Révolution Française et la Psychologie des Révolutions, Aphorismes du temps présent, and La Vie des vérités in back-to-back years from 1910 to 1914, expounding in which his views on affective and rational thought, the psychology of race, and the history of civilisation.

=== Later life and death ===
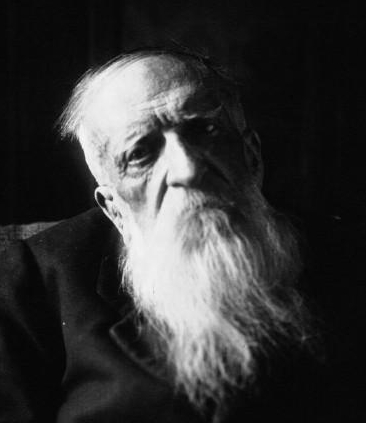
Le Bon in 1929, aged 88

Le Bon continued writing throughout World War I, publishing Enseignements Psychologiques de la Guerre Européenne (1915), Premières conséquences de la guerre: transformation mentale des peuples (1916) and Hier et demain. Pensées brèves (1918) during the war.

He then released Psychologie des Temps Nouveaux (1920) before resigning from his position as Professor of Psychology and Allied Sciences at the University of Paris and retiring to his home.

He released Le Déséquilibre du Monde, Les Incertitudes de l'heure présente and L'évolution actuelle du monde, illusions et réalités in 1923, 1924 and 1927 respectively, giving in them his views of the world during the volatile interwar period.

He became a Grand-Croix of the Legion of Honour in 1929. He published his last work, entitled Bases scientifiques d'une philosophie de l'histoire, in 1931 and on 13 December, died in Marnes-la-Coquette, Île-de-France at the age of ninety.

In putting an end to the long, diverse and fruitful activity of Gustave Le Bon, death deprived our culture of a truly remarkable man. His was a man of most exceptional intelligence; it sprang entirely from within himself; he was his own master, his own initiator.... Science and philosophy have suffered a cruel loss.

== Le Bonian thought ==
Convinced that human actions are guided by eternal laws, Le Bon attempted to synthesise Auguste Comte and Herbert Spencer with Jules Michelet and Alexis de Tocqueville.

=== Inspirations ===
According to Steve Reicher, Le Bon was not the first crowd psychologist: "The first debate in crowd psychology was actually between two criminologists, Scipio Sighele and Gabriel Tarde, concerning how to determine and assign criminal responsibility within a crowd and hence who to arrest." Le Bon, who also explicitly recognised the positive potential of crowds, viewed the criminological focus of the earlier authors as an unnecessary restriction for the study of crowd psychology.

=== Crowds ===
Le Bon theorised that the new entity, the "psychological crowd", which emerges from incorporating the assembled population not only forms a new body but also creates a collective "unconsciousness". As a group of people gather together and coalesces to form a crowd, there is a "magnetic influence given out by the crowd" that transmutes every individual's behaviour until it becomes governed by the "group mind". This model treats the crowd as a unit in its composition which robs every individual member of their opinions, values and beliefs; as Le Bon states: "An individual in a crowd is a grain of sand amid other grains of sand, which the wind stirs up at will".

Le Bon detailed three key processes that create the psychological crowd: i) Anonymity, ii) Contagion and iii) Suggestibility. Anonymity provides to rational individuals a feeling of invincibility and the loss of personal responsibility. An individual becomes primitive, unreasoning, and emotional. This lack of self-restraint allows individuals to "yield to instincts" and to accept the instinctual drives of their "unconscious". For Le Bon, the crowd inverts Darwin's law of evolution and becomes atavistic, proving Ernst Haeckel's embryological theory: "ontogeny recapitulates phylogeny". Contagion refers to the spread in the crowd of particular behaviours and individuals sacrifice their personal interest for the collective interest. Suggestibility is the mechanism through which the contagion is achieved; as the crowd coalesces into a singular mind, suggestions made by strong voices in the crowd create a space for the unconscious to come to the forefront and guide its behaviour. At this stage, the psychological crowd becomes homogeneous and malleable to suggestions from its strongest members. "The leaders we speak of," says Le Bon, "are usually men of action rather than of words. They are not gifted with keen foresight... They are especially recruited from the ranks of those morbidly nervous excitable half-deranged persons who are bordering on madness."

== Influence ==
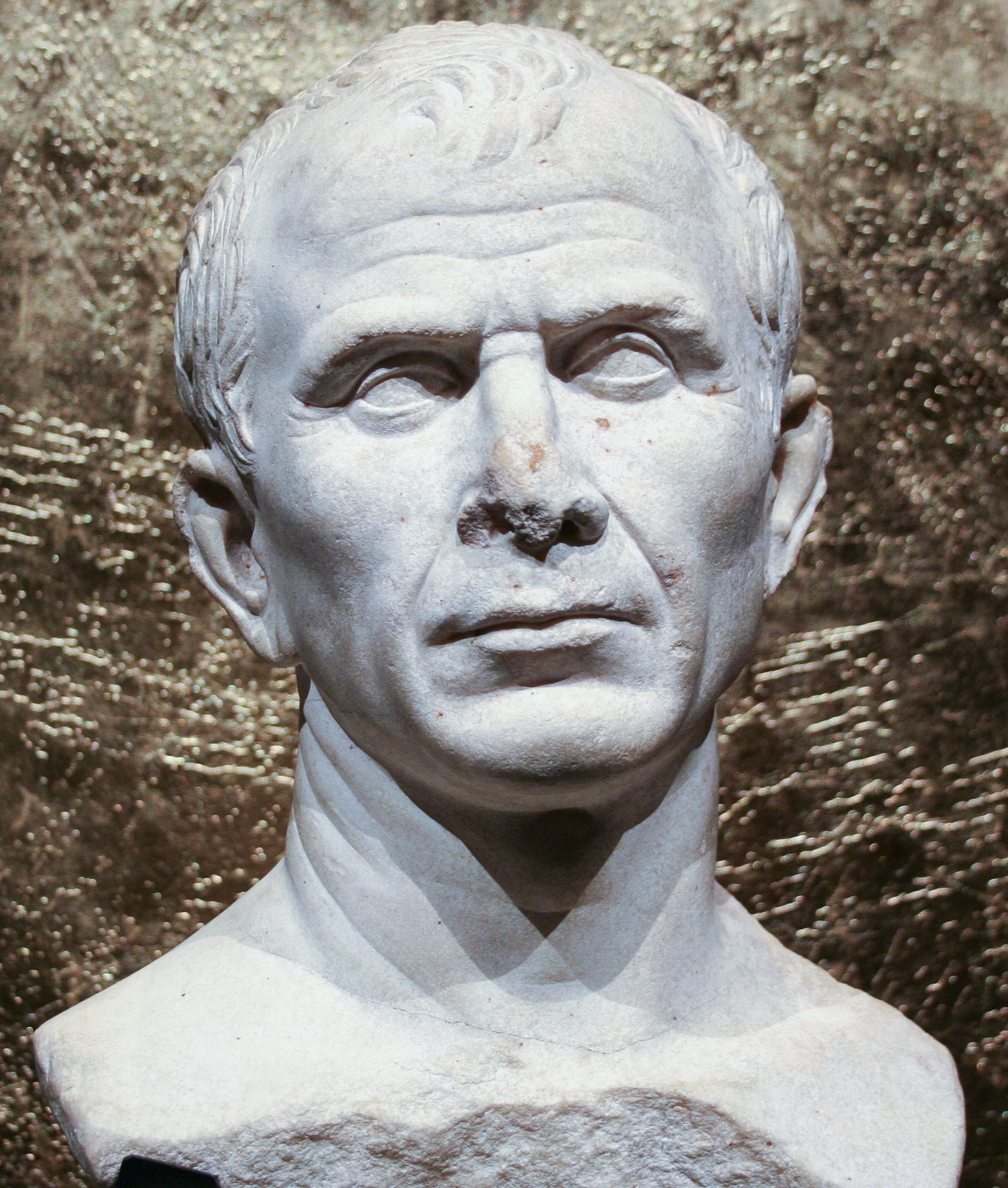
"The type of hero dear to a crowd will always have the semblance of a Caesar. His insignia attracts them, his authority overawes them, and his sword instills them with fear."

George Lachmann Mosse claimed that fascist theories of leadership that emerged during the 1920s owed much to Le Bon's theories of crowd psychology. Adolf Hitler is known to have read The Crowd and in Mein Kampf drew on the propaganda techniques proposed by Le Bon. Benito Mussolini also made a careful study of Le Bon.

Le Bon was widely read within the Committee of Union and Progress in the late 19th and early 20th centuries. Philosophical and military leaders who would later lead the Young Turk Revolution, such as Ahmet Rıza and Enver Bey, took inspiration from Le Bon and movements such as Social Darwinism to define their elitist and authoritarian approach to politics, as well as their advocacy of revolution from above.

Some commentators have drawn a link between Le Bon and Vladimir Lenin / the Bolsheviks, although the two are polar opposites ideologically.

Just prior to World War I, Wilfred Trotter introduced Wilfred Bion to Le Bon's writings and Sigmund Freud's work Group Psychology and the Analysis of the Ego. Trotter's book Instincts of the Herd in Peace and War (1919) forms the basis for the research of both Wilfred Bion and Ernest Jones who established what would be called group dynamics. During the first half of the twentieth century, Le Bon's writings were used by media researchers such as Hadley Cantril and Herbert Blumer to describe the reactions of subordinate groups to media.

Edward Bernays, a nephew of Sigmund Freud, was influenced by Le Bon and Trotter. In his influential book Propaganda, he declared that a major feature of democracy was the manipulation of the electorate by the mass media and advertising. Some have claimed that Theodore Roosevelt, Charles G. Dawes and many other American progressives in the early 20th century were also deeply affected by Le Bon's writings.

== See also ==
- Philosophical anthropology
- Völkerpsychologie

== Works ==
Bibliography compiled from the 1984 reissue of Psychologie du Socialisme.

Medical

- De la mort apparente et des inhumations prématurées (1866); ("Apparent Death and Premature Burials")
- Traité pratique des maladies des organes génitaux-urinaires (1869); ("Practical Treatise of Diseases of the Genitourinary System")
- La Vie physiologique humaine appliquée à l'hygiène et à la médecine (1874); ("Life (Treatise of Human Physiology)")

Anthropology, psychology and sociology

- Histoire des origines et du développement de l'homme et des sociétés (1877); ("History of the Origins and Development of Man and Society")
- Voyage aux Monts-Tatras (1881); ("Travel to Tatra Mountains")
- L'Homme et les sociétés (1881); ("Man and Society")
- La Civilisation des Arabes (1884); The World of Islamic Civilization (1884)
- Voyage au Népal (1886); ("Travel to Nepal")
- Les Civilisations de l'Inde (1887); ("The Civilisations of India")
- Les Premières Civilisations de l'Orient (1889); ("The First Civilisations of the Orient")
- Les Monuments de l'Inde (1893); ("The Monuments of India")
- Les Lois Psychologiques de l'Évolution des Peuples (1894); ("The Psychology of Peoples", 1898) Audiobook available.
- Psychologie des Foules (1895); ("The Crowd: A Study of the Popular Mind", 1986) Full text available; Audiobook available.
- Psychologie du Socialisme (1896); The Psychology of Socialism (1899)
- Psychologie de l'éducation (1902); ("The Psychology of Education")
- La Psychologie Politique et la Défense Sociale (1910); ("The Psychology of Politics and Social Defense")
- Les Opinions et les croyances (1911); ("Opinions and Beliefs")
- La Révolution Française et la Psychologie des Révolutions (1912); The Psychology of Revolution (1913) Audiobook available; The French Revolution and the Psychology of Revolution (1980).
- Aphorismes du temps présent (1913); ("Aphorisms of Present Times")
- La Vie des vérités (1914); ("Truths of Life")
- Enseignements Psychologiques de la Guerre Européenne (1915); The Psychology of the Great War (1916)
- Premières conséquences de la guerre: transformation mentale des peuples (1916); ("First Consequences of War: Mental Transformation of Peoples")
- Hier et demain. Pensées brèves (1918); ("Yesterday and Tomorrow. Brief thoughts")
- Psychologie des Temps Nouveaux (1920); The World in Revolt (1921)
- Le Déséquilibre du Monde (1923); The World Unbalanced (1924)
- Les Incertitudes de l'heure présente (1924); ("The Uncertainties of the Present Hour")
- L'Évolution actuelle du monde, illusions et réalités (1927); ("The Current Evolution of the World, Illusions and Realities")
- Bases scientifiques d'une philosophie de l'histoire (1931); ("Scientific Basis for a Philosophy of History")

Natural science

- La Méthode graphique et les appareils enregistreurs (1878); ("The Graphical Method and recording devices")
- Recherches anatomiques et mathématiques sur les variations de volume du cerveau et sur leurs relations avec l'intelligence (1879); ("Anatomical and mathematical research on the changes in brain volume and its relationships with intelligence")
- La Fumée du tabac (1880); ("Tobacco smoke")
- Les Levers photographiques (1888); ("Photographic surveying")
- L'Équitation actuelle et ses principes. Recherches expérimentales (1892); ("Equitation: The Psychology of the Horse")
- L'Évolution de la Matière (1905); The Evolution of Matter (1907)
- La Naissance et l'évanouissement de la matière (1907); ("The birth and disappearance of matter")
- L'Évolution des Forces (1907); The Evolution of Forces (1908)

== Sources ==
- Barrows, Susanna (1981), Distorting Mirrors – Visions of the Crowd in Late 19th Century France, Yale University Press
- Nye, Robert (1975), The Origins of Crowd Psychology – Gustave Le Bon and the Crisis of Mass Democracy in the Third Republic, Sage
- van Ginneken, Jaap (1992), Crowds, Psychology, and Politics, 1871–1899, Cambridge University Press
- Betts, Raymond F. (1960), Assimilation and Association in French Colonial Theory, 1890–1914, U of Nebraska Press
- Staum, Martin S. (2011), Nature and Nurture in French Social Sciences, 1859–1914 and Beyond, McGill-Queen's Press
- de Benoist, Alain (1977), Vu de droite. Anthologie critique des idées contemporaines, Copernic
- Terrier, Jean (2011), Visions of the Social: Society as a Political Project in France, 1750–1950, Brill
- Ohlberg, Marieke (2014), The Era of Crowds: Gustave Le Bon, Crowd Psychology and Conceptualizations of Mass-Elite Relations in China, Springer
- Widener, Alice (1979), Gustave Le Bon, the Man and His Works, Liberty Press
