= Elias Canetti =

German-language author (1905–1994)

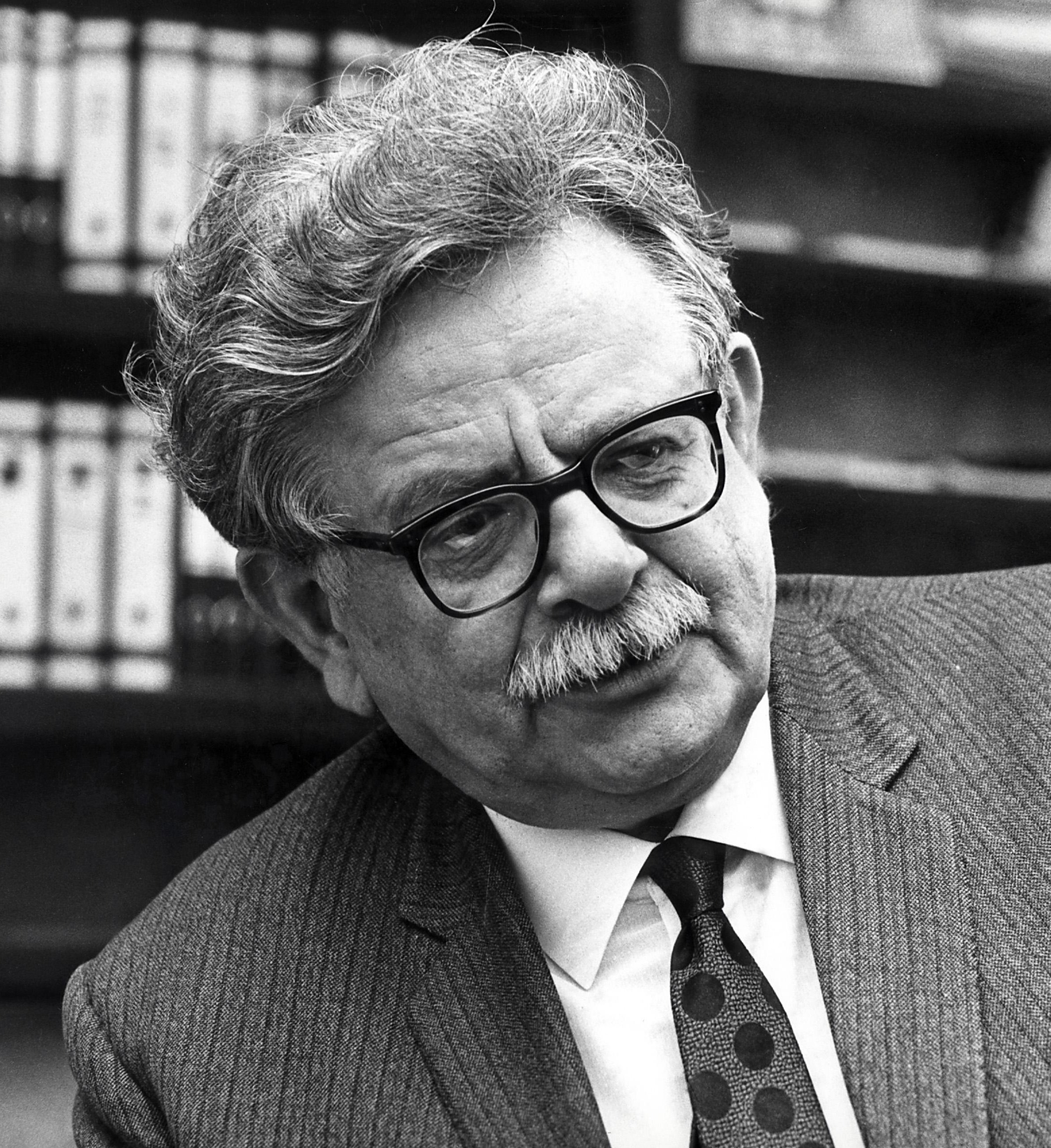
- Born: 25 July 1905; Ruse, Bulgaria
- Died: 14 August 1994 (aged 89); Zürich, Switzerland
- Education: University of Vienna (PhD, 1929)
- Occupation: Novelist
- Spouses: Veza Taubner-Calderon (m. 1934; died 1963) Hera Buschor (m. 1971)
- Writing career
- Language: German
- Notable awards: Nobel Prize in Literature; 1981
- Movement: Modernism

Elias Canetti (/kəˈnɛti, kɑː-/; German: [eˈliːas kaˈnɛti]; 25 July 1905 – 14 August 1994) was a German-language writer, known as a modernist novelist, playwright, memoirist, and nonfiction writer.

Born in Ruse, Bulgaria, to a Sephardic Jewish family, he later lived in England, Austria, Germany, and Switzerland. He won the 1981 Nobel Prize in Literature, "for writings marked by a broad outlook, a wealth of ideas and artistic power".

He is noted for his nonfiction book Crowds and Power, among other works.

== Early life ==
He was born in 1905 to businessman Jacques Canetti and Mathilde (née Arditti) in Ruse, a city on the Danube in Bulgaria.

He was the eldest of three sons. His ancestors were Sephardic Jews. His paternal ancestors settled in Ruse from Ottoman Adrianople. The original family name was Cañete, named after Cañete, Cuenca, a village in Spain.

In Ruse, Canetti's father and grandfather were successful merchants who operated out of a commercial building, which they had built in 1898. Canetti's mother descended from the Arditti family, one of the oldest Sephardic families in Bulgaria, who were among the founders of the Ruse Jewish colony in the late 18th century.

The Ardittis can be traced to the 14th century, when they were court physicians and astronomers to the Aragonese royal court of Alfonso IV and Peter IV. Before settling in Ruse, they had migrated to Italy and lived in Livorno in the 17th century.

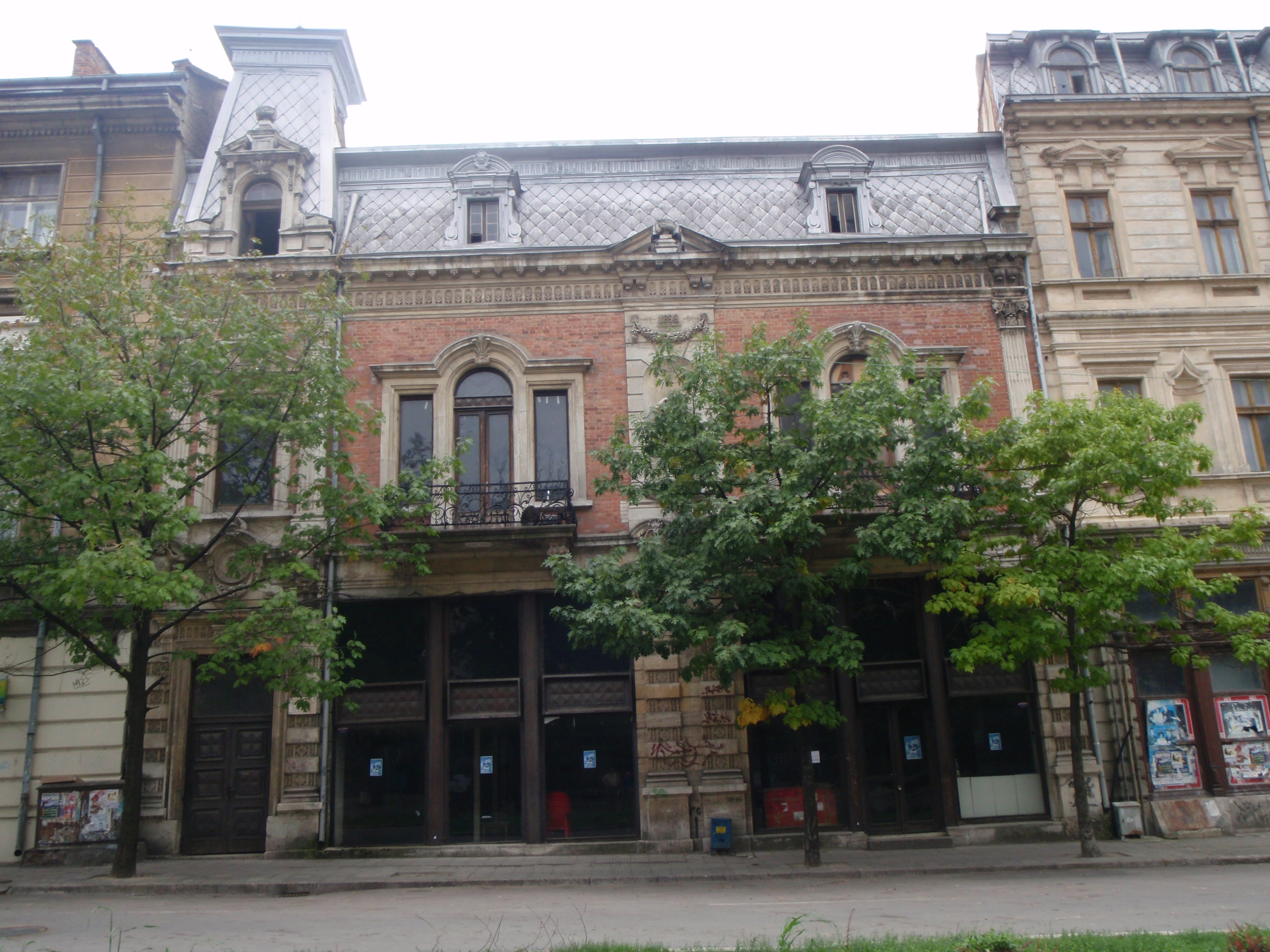
The trading house of Elias Avram Canetti, grandfather of Elias Canetti, in Ruse, Bulgaria

Canetti spent his childhood years, from 1905 to 1911, in Ruse until the family moved to Manchester, England, where Canetti's father joined a business established by his wife's brothers.

In 1912, his father suddenly died. His mother moved with their children first to Lausanne, then, later in the same year, when Canetti was seven, to Vienna. His mother insisted that he learn and speak German.

By this time, Canetti already spoke Ladino (his native language), Bulgarian, English, and some French; the last two he studied during the year he spent in Britain. Subsequently, his family moved first to Zürich and then to Frankfurt, where Canetti graduated from high school.

Canetti went back to Vienna in 1924 in order to study chemistry. However, his primary interests during his years in Vienna became philosophy and literature.

== Career ==
Introduced into the literary circles of First Republic Vienna, he started writing. Politically left-leaning, he was present at the July Revolt of 1927, accidentally came near to the action, was most impressed by the burning of books (recalled frequently in his writings), and left the place quickly with his bicycle.

He received a doctorate in chemistry from the University of Vienna in 1929 but never worked as a chemist.

In Vienna, he published two works, Komödie der Eitelkeit 1934 (The Comedy of Vanity) and Die Blendung 1935 (Auto-da-Fé, 1935), before escaping to Great Britain. He reflected on the experiences of Nazi Germany and political chaos in his works, especially exploring mob action and group thinking in the novel Die Blendung and in the non-fiction Crowds and Power (1960). He wrote several volumes of memoirs, in which he contemplated the influence of his multilingual background and childhood.

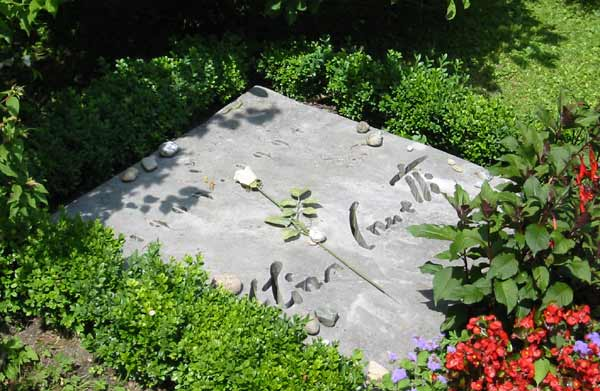
Canetti's tombstone in Zürich, Switzerland

== Personal life ==
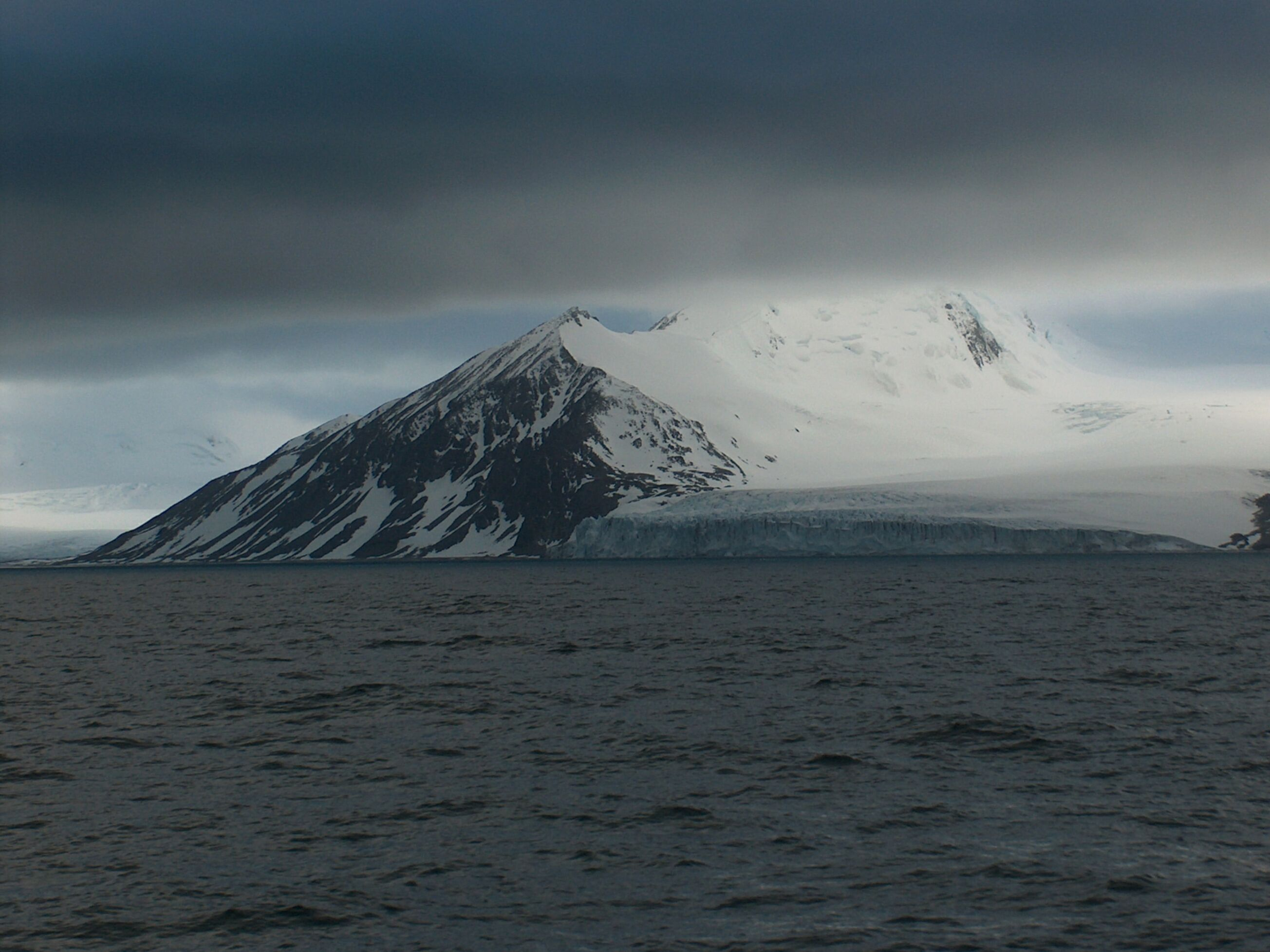
Canetti Peak, in the South Shetland Islands, Antarctica, named after Elias Canetti.

In 1934 in Vienna he married Veza (Venetiana) Taubner-Calderon (1897–1963), who acted as his muse and devoted literary assistant. Canetti remained open to relationships with other women. He had a short affair with sculptor Anna Mahler, the daughter of composer Gustav Mahler.

In 1938, after the Anschluss with Germany, the Canettis moved to London. He became closely involved with painter Marie-Louise von Motesiczky, who was to remain a close companion for many years.

He also had a close relationship with writer Frieda Benedikt (1916–1953; pseudonym Anna Sebastian), whom Canetti had already met in Vienna in 1936.

He was one of Iris Murdoch's lovers. Her husband John Bayley's memoir refers to him variously as 'the Dichter', 'sage', and 'the monster of Hampstead'. Canetti, who demanded submission from women, later mercilessly skewered Murdoch in his posthumous memoir Party im Blitz (2003).

After Veza died in 1963, Canetti married Hera Buschor (1933–1988), with whom he had a daughter, Johanna, in 1972. Canetti's brother Jacques Canetti settled in Paris, where he championed a revival of French chanson.

Despite being a German-language writer, Canetti settled in Britain until the 1970s, receiving British citizenship in 1952. For his last 20 years, Canetti lived mostly in Zürich.

== Awards ==
A writer in the German language, Canetti won the Nobel Prize in Literature in 1981, "for writings marked by a broad outlook, a wealth of ideas and artistic power". He is known chiefly for his celebrated trilogy of autobiographical memoirs of his childhood and of pre-Anschluss Vienna: Die Gerettete Zunge (The Tongue Set Free); Die Fackel im Ohr (The Torch in My Ear), and Das Augenspiel (The Play of the Eyes); for his modernist novel Auto-da-Fé (Die Blendung); and for Crowds and Power, a psychological study of crowd behaviour as it manifests itself in human activities ranging from mob violence to religious congregations.

== Death ==
In the 1970s, Canetti began to travel more frequently to Zurich, where he eventually settled and lived for his last 20 years. He died in Zürich in 1994.

== Honours and awards ==
- Grand Austrian State Prize for Literature (1967)
- Literature Award of the Bavarian Academy of the Fine Arts (1969)
- Austrian Decoration for Science and Art (1972)
- Georg Büchner Prize (German Academy for Language and Literature, 1972)
- German recording prize, for reading "Ohrenzeuge" (Deutscher Schallplattenpreis) (1975)
- Nelly Sachs Prize (1975)
- Gottfried-Keller-Preis (1977)
- Pour le Mérite (1979)
- Johann-Peter-Hebel-Preis (Baden-Württemberg, 1980)
- Franz Kafka Prize of the city of Klosterneuburg (1981)
- Nobel Prize in Literature (1981)
- Grand Merit Cross of the Order of Merit of the Federal Republic of Germany (1983)
- In 1975, Canetti was awarded an honorary doctorate from the University of Manchester and another one from LMU Munich, in 1976.
- Canetti Peak on Livingston Island in the South Shetland Islands, Antarctica, is named after him.

== Works ==
- Komödie der Eitelkeit 1934 (The Comedy of Vanity)
- Die Blendung 1935 (Auto-da-Fé, novel, tr. by Cicely Wedgwood (Jonathan Cape, Ltd., 1946). The first American edition of Wedgwood's translation was titled The Tower of Babel (Alfred A. Knopf, 1947).
- Die Befristeten 1956 (1956 premiere of the play in Oxford) (Their Days are Numbered)
- Masse und Macht 1960 (Crowds and Power, study, tr. 1962 by Carol Stewart, published in Hamburg)
- Aufzeichnungen 1942 – 1948 (1965) (Sketches)
- Die Stimmen von Marrakesch 1968 published by Hanser in Munich (The Voices of Marrakesh, travelogue, tr. 1978 by J. A. Underwood)
- Der andere Prozess 1969 Kafkas Briefe an Felice (Kafka's Other Trial, tr. 1974 by Christopher Middleton)
- Hitler nach Speer (Essay)
- Die Provinz des Menschen Aufzeichnungen 1942 – 1972 (The Human Province, tr. 1978)
- Der Ohrenzeuge. Fünfzig Charaktere 1974 ("Ear Witness: Fifty Characters", tr. 1979).
- Das Gewissen der Worte 1975. Essays (The Conscience of Words)
- Die Gerettete Zunge 1977 (The Tongue Set Free, memoir, tr. 1979 by Joachim Neugroschel)
- Die Fackel im Ohr 1980 Lebensgeschichte 1921 – 1931 (The Torch in My Ear, memoir, tr. 1982 by Joachim Neugroschel)
- Das Augenspiel 1985 Lebensgeschichte 1931 – 1937 (The Play of the Eyes, memoir, tr. 1990 by Ralph Mannheim)
- The Memoirs of Elias Canetti 1999, consisting of The Tongue Set Free, The Torch in My Ear, and The Play of the Eyes
- Das Geheimherz der Uhr: Aufzeichnungen 1987 (The Secret Heart of the Clock, tr. 1989)
- Die Fliegenpein (The Agony of Flies, 1992)
- Nachträge aus Hampstead (Notes from Hampstead, 1994)
- The Voices of Marrakesh (published posthumously, Arion Press, 2001, with photographs by Karl Bissinger and etchings by William T. Wiley )
- Party im Blitz; Die englischen Jahre 2003 (Party in the Blitz, memoir, published posthumously, tr. 2005)
- Aufzeichnungen für Marie-Louise (written 1942, compiled and published posthumously, 2005)
- Das Buch gegen den Tod (The Book Against Death; published posthumously, 2014; tr. 2024)

== See also ==
- Crowd psychology
- List of Austrian writers
- List of Nobel laureates by country
- Marie-Louise von Motesiczky
- Ruth von Mayenburg
- List of Jewish Nobel laureates

== Bibliography ==
- Andrea Mubi Brighenti (2011). "Elias Canetti and the counter-image of resistance". Thesis Eleven. 106 (1): 73–87. doi:10.1177/0725513611407451. S2CID 143477457.
- Lesley Brill, "Terrorism, "Crowds and Power", and the Dogs of War", Anthropological Quarterly 76(1), Winter 2003: 87–94.
- William Collins Donahue, The End of Modernism: Elias Canetti's Auto-da-Fé (University of North Carolina Press, 2001).
- William Collins Donahue and Julian Preece (eds), The Worlds of Elias Canetti: Centenary Essays (Cambridge Scholars Publishing, 2007).
- Roger Gentis, La folie Canetti, Paris: Maurice Nadeau, 1993
- Antonello Lombardi, La scuola dell'ascolto: Oralità, suono e musica nell'opera di Elias Canetti, Ut Orpheus Edizioni, Bologna 2011, ISBN 978-88-8109-474-5
- Antonello Lombardi, "Gli animali mancanti: La fauna nell'opera di Elias Canetti", in In forma di parole, Animali, volume secondo, IV 2012, Bologna 2013.
- Antonello Lombardi, Le memorie di Georges Kien, Portatori d'Acqua, Pesaro 2015, ISBN 978-88-987790-3-1
- Antonello Lombardi, "Elias Canetti e la scuola dell'ascolto", in Nuova informazione bibliografica (il Mulino 2/2016, aprile-giugno
- Dagmar C.G. Lorenz (2009), "Introduction": A Companion to the Works of Elias Canetti.
- Manuel Vázquez Montalbán and Willi Glasauer (1988). Escenas de la Literatura Universal y Retratos de Grandes Autores. Barcelona: Círculo de Lectores.
- Mack, Michael (2001). Anthropology as memory : Elias Canetti's and Franz Baermann Steiner's responses to the Shoah. Tübingen: Max Niemeyer Verlag. ISBN 9783110965964.
- Peter Morgan (2005), "Georges Kien and the 'Diagnosis of Delusion' in Elias Canetti's Die Blendung", Twentieth-Century Literary Criticism Volume 157. United States: Gale.
- Idris Parry, "Attitudes to Power", in Speak Silence (1988), p. 253-

=== Reviews ===
- Stevenson, Randall (1982), The Privacy Industry of Franz Kafka, a review of Canetti's Kafka's Other Trial: The Letters to Felice, in Cencrastus No. 9, Summer 1982, pp. 45 & 46, ISSN 0264-0856
