= Scipio Sighele =

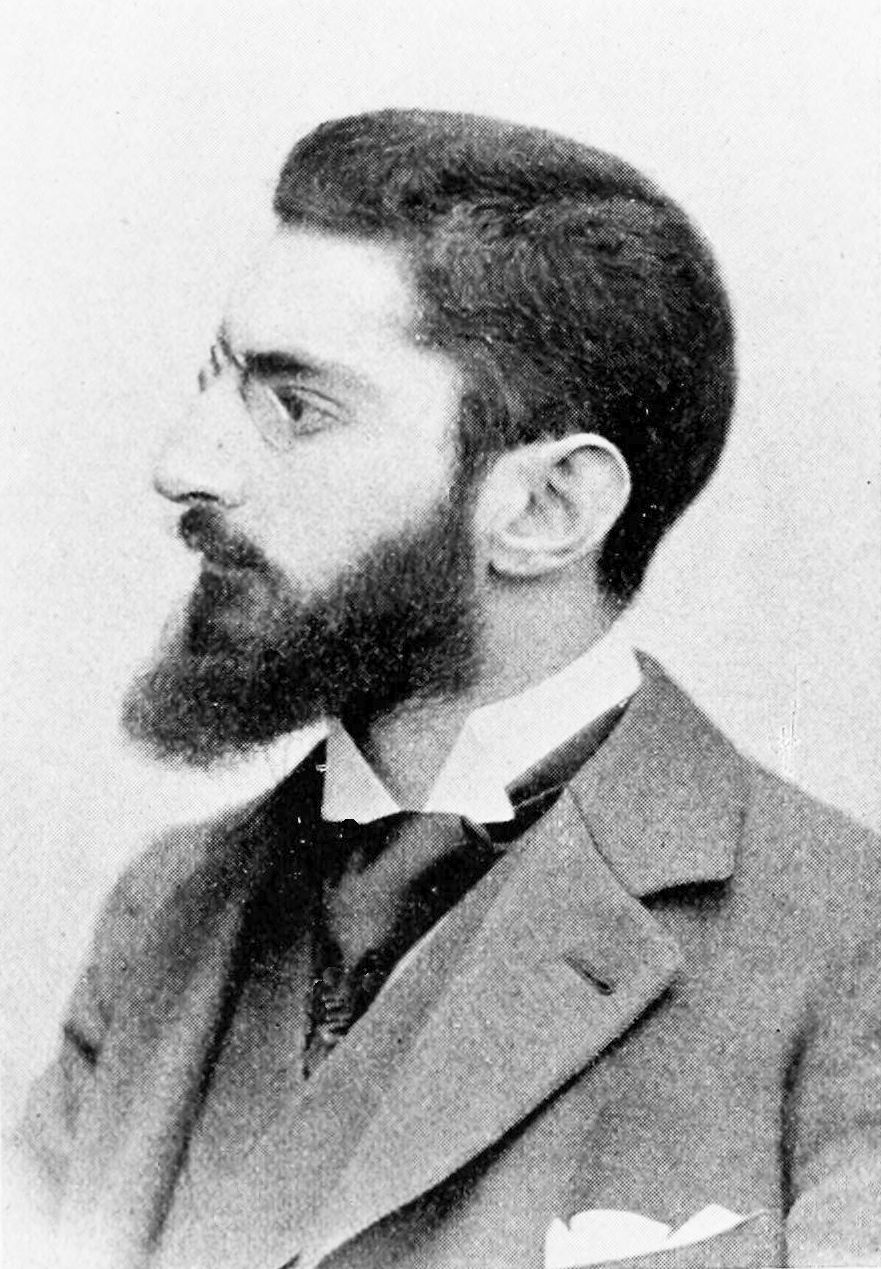
- Born: June 24, 1868; Brescia
- Died: October 21, 1913 (aged 45); Florence

Scipio Sighele (24 June 1868 – 21 October 1913) was an Italian psychologist, sociologist, criminologist and a pioneer of mass psychology. He was born in Brescia. He studied law at the University of Rome and taught at the Free University of Brussels from 1892 to 1902.

He is famous for the work The Criminal Crowd. In this work, he mentioned Enrico Ferri, a contemporary colleague and friend, several times. They shared similar views on the influence of a crowd on its members. This fundamental idea was also described by Gabriel Tarde and Gustave le Bon. Sighele and Tarde debated how to determine and assign criminal responsibility within a crowd.

Sighele died in Florence, aged 45.

== Selected works ==
- The Criminal Crowd and Other Writings on Mass Society. University of Toronto Press. 2018 [Reissued]. ISBN 978-1-4875-1735-9.
- L'intelligenza della folla (in Italian). Turin: Bocca. 1903.
