= Critique of Anthropology =

- Discipline: Anthropology
- Language: English
- Edited by: John Gledhill, Stephen Nugent

Publication details
- History: 1974-present
- Publisher: SAGE Publications
- Frequency: Quarterly
- Impact factor: 1.333 (2019)

Standard abbreviations
- ISO 4: Crit. Anthropol.

Indexing
- ISSN: 0308-275X (print); 1460-3721 (web)
- LCCN: 78640439
- OCLC no.: 165952642

Links
- Journal homepage; Online access; Online archive

Critique of Anthropology is a quarterly peer-reviewed academic journal covering anthropology. It was established in 1974 and is published by SAGE Publications. The editors-in-chief are John Gledhill (University of Manchester) and Stephen Nugent (Goldsmiths College).

== Abstracting and indexing ==
Critique of Anthropology is abstracted and indexed in Scopus and the Social Sciences Citation Index. According to the Journal Citation Reports, the journal has a 2019 impact factor of 1.333.
