= Agnes Horvath =

Political anthropologist

Academic background
- Education: European University Institute
- Thesis: The nature of the trickster's game : an interpretive understanding of Communism (2000)

Agnes Horvath is a political anthropologist and the founder of the International Political Anthropology Journal.

== Education ==
Horvath received both a doctorate in law and an M.A. in sociology from the Budapest University of Economics and Business in 2000. She earned her Ph.D. in social and political sciences from the European University Institute.

== Career ==
She is known for her work on liminality, boundaries, void, divinisation and walling, Eros and beauty, trickster, parasitism, and charisma in political leadership, alchemy and magic from political anthropological view.

== Selected publications ==
- Horváth, Ágnes; Szakolczai, Árpád (1992). The Dissolution of Communist Power. London: London; New York : Routledge. ISBN 978-0-415-06709-6.
- Horvath, Agnes; Thomassen, Bjørn; Wydra, Harald (2015). Breaking Boundaries: varieties of liminality. New York: Berghahn Books. ISBN 978-1-78238-766-4.
- Horváth, Ágnes; Szakolczai, Árpád (2019-10-10). The Political Sociology and Anthropology of Evil. Abingdon, Oxon New York, NY: Routledge. ISBN 978-1-138-31214-2.
- Horvath, Agnes (2021-03-21). Political Alchemy: Technology Unbounded. Abingdon, Oxon New York, NY: Routledge. ISBN 978-1-000-35656-4.
- Horvath, Agnes (2024). Magic and the Will to Science. Oxford: Routledge. ISBN 978-1-032-45736-9.
