= Crowds and Power =

1960 book by Elias Canetti

- First Edition
- Author: Elias Canetti
- Original title: Masse und Macht
- Translator: Carol Stewart
- Language: German
- Publication date: 1960
- Publication place: Germany

Crowds and Power (German: Masse und Macht) is a 1960 book by Elias Canetti, dealing with the dynamics of crowds and "packs" and the question of how and why crowds obey power of rulers. Canetti draws a parallel between ruling and paranoia. The book analyzes the memoirs of Daniel Paul Schreber and Sigmund Freud's book on them, and Gustave Le Bon.

The book was translated from German into English by Carol Stewart in 1962 and published by Gollancz.

== Overview ==
Although wide-ranging in its erudition, this essay is not scholarly or academic in a conventional way. Canetti uses "we" in his text and does not dissociate from humanity.

On asking questions: "On the questioner the effect is a feeling of enhanced power. He enjoys this and consequentially asks more and more questions; every answer he receives is an act of submission. Personal freedom consists largely in having a defence against questions. The most blatant tyranny is the one which asks the most blatant questions."

This work remains important for the insights it provided into the Eastern European upheaval which can be understood within the framework Canetti puts forth. It shows the growth of crowds and their power against even the power of the state.

== See also ==
- Multitude

== Bibliography ==
- Brill, Lesley (2003). "Terrorism, Crowds and Power, and the Dogs of War". Anthropological Quarterly. 76 (1 Winter): 87–94. doi:10.1353/anq.2003.0004. JSTOR 3318363. S2CID 144861590.
- Canetti, Elias (1984). Crowds and Power. New York: Farrar, Straus and Giroux. ISBN 0-374-51820-3.
- Honneth, Axel (1996). "The Perpetuation of the State of Nature: on the Cognitive Content of Elias Canetti's Crowds and Power". Thesis Eleven. 45: 69–85. doi:10.1177/0725513696001045007. S2CID 144262268.
- Kiss, Endre (2004). "Does mass psychology renaturalize political theory? On the methodological originality of 'Crowds and Power'". The European Legacy: Toward New Paradigms. 9 (6): 725–738. doi:10.1080/1084877042000311581. S2CID 144059558.
- McClelland, John: "The Place of Elias Canetti's Crowds and Power in the History of Western Social and Political Thought." Thesis Eleven 1996 45: 16–27.
- Phillips, William (February 1, 1963). "History on the Couch". The New York Review of Books. 1 (1).
