= Bjørn Thomassen =

Anthropologist, social scientist and associate professor

Bjørn Thomassen (born 1968) is interim pro-rector for research at Roskilde University. He is professor of global political sociology at the Department of Social Sciences and Business. From 2003-2012 he worked at The American University of Rome, where he was chair of the department of International Relations.

== Education ==
Thomassen holds BA and MA degrees in Anthropology from the Institute of Anthropology at the University of Copenhagen (1994 and 1997) and a Doctoral Degree (Ph.D.) in Political and Social Science from the Department of Political and Social Sciences (2001), at the European University Institute, Florence, Italy. After his PhD he worked as a post-doctoral researcher at the University College Cork, Ireland.

== Research ==
Thomassen has published academic books for leading academic publishing houses, including Indiana University Press, Cambridge University Press and Oxford University Press. He has published extensively in leading international journals in sociology, anthropology, history and philosophy, including Comparative Studies in Society and History, Politics & Religion, Perspectives on Politics, Journal of Classical Sociology, European Journal of Social Theory, Religion and Politics, History of the Human Sciences, Culture, Theory & Society, Journal of Political Ideologies, Anthropological Theory, Journal of the Royal Anthropological Institute, Critique of Anthropology, History and Theory, History and Anthropology, Journal of Modern Italian Studies, Dansk Sociologi, Religions, Religion & Society.

Thomassen’s main contribution to science has been an attempt to rethink social theory via anthropologically inspired concepts. This endeavor took departure from his initial work on liminality, which he argued can be applied far beyond its original context of ritual passages. Thomassen argues that liminality belongs to a larger conceptual toolkit that can revitalize social and also political theory, including terms like “schismogenesis”, “trickster” and “imitation” that he sees as crucial for understanding the contemporary condition. His work on liminality has become a reference point across the social and human sciences in this wider sense. He has also contributed to a series of more specific fields of science, including the sociology of religion, political anthropology, the study of political revolutions, Italian social and political history, memory studies, globalization theory, the axial age debate.

His most recent books are Italy's Christian Democracy: The Catholic Encounter with Political Modernity (with Rosario Forlenza, 2024), From Anthropology to Social Theory (with Arpad Szakolczai, 2019) and Liminality and the Modern (2014). A main part of his empirical research evolves around Italian society and culture. Thomassen is used by Danish media to cover developments relates to Italy and Italian society and also developments in global religion, Christianity, Catholicism and the Catholic church. He has written non-scholarly articles for the Danish weekly, Weekendavisen and he has been a columnist for Kristeligt Dagblad since 2014.

His PhD research related to the anthropology of political borders, with ethnographic focus on the border region between Italy, Slovenia and Croatia known as the “Julian Region”. He examined how cultural and national identities are constructed through conflicting collective memories in a political and cultural environment defined by historically changing borders. He wrote his PhD thesis as a narrative evolving from the life-stories of self-identified Italians from Istria who for various reasons chose to leave Tito's Yugoslavia and moved “back” to Italy.

After his PhD, Thomassen has engaged various areas of research. He writes and publishes on immigration in Italy. Together with colleagues James Walston and Isabella Clough-Marinaro he has organized several conferences on immigration and integration in Italy. In this context he is also engaged in various community projects, including a project launched by the American University of Rome in 2011 to foster immigrant leadership in Italy.

Thomassen also teaches and does research related to urban anthropology. In 2010 he co-organized a conference at the AUR in Rome, called “Changing Faces of the Eternal City”, which brought together leading Italian and international scholars dedicated to the study of contemporary Rome.

Thomassen is principally interested in how anthropological ideas and approaches can inform political and social theory and the study of contemporary politics. He has in several publications explored the concept of liminality and its potential for understanding change and transition in modern societies. In an article from 2012, “From Liminal to Limivoid: Understanding contemporary Bungee Jumping in a cross-cultural perspective”, co-authored with his cross-cousin Maja Balle, he coined the term “limivoid” to denote liminal experiences that are essentially void of experiential substance and transformative potential. Elaborating Victor Turner's notion of the “liminoid”, he argued that the “limovoid” critically identifies an underlying aspect of the larger (post)modern celebration of boundary experiences.

In recent work Thomassen has sought to develop an anthropological approach to political revolutions. Thomassen has also engaged the axial age debate from the perspective of anthropology.

This relates to Thomassen's approach to the larger discussion over “multiple modernities”. Another branch of Thomassen's teaching and research focuses on the question of social memory and identity politics. With reference to Italy, he discusses how the past is continuously but variously used in the articulation of people's urban, regional, national and European identities. He employs anthropological approaches to history and politics as produced and reproduced through memory politics via rituals, symbols and collective commemorations. Part of this research is developed with Italian historian, Rosario Forlenza.

Together with former student, Derrick Fiedler, Thomassen has revisited the work of Arnold Toynbee and argued for its contemporary relevance. In an article from 2012, Thomassen critically engaged the political philosophy of John Rawls, arguing from a perspective inspired by political theorist, Eric Voegelin. Via participation in the yearly held “Socrates Symposium” in Florence, Thomassen has also taken an interest in Plato's philosophy.

Currently, he does research within the global sociology of religion. In 2026 he finished a project funded by The Velux Foundation on “The Catholic Ethic and the Spirit of Global Modernities”, of which he was project leader (together with Andreas Bandak, University of Copenhagen). The project unearthed lived Catholicism among migrant minorities in Denmark within a transnational context. From 2026 he leads a research project funded by the Danish Research Council called “Sic Transit. Economies of Worth and Dignification of Labour: An Ethnography of the Fehmarn Construction Project”, working together with Michael Brixtofte Petersen.

Thomassen is a founding editor-in-chief of the peer-reviewed academic journal International Political Anthropology. Thomassen has previously served as scientific expert and evaluator for the European Research Council. From 2018 to 2024 he was expert evaluator for the Danish Research Council.

== Teaching career ==
During his tenure at Roskilde University, Thomassen has developed and taught a wide range of courses at the undergraduate and graduate levels, within sociology, social theory, ethnographic methods, political revolutions, social movements, global religion, global studies and globalization. Thomassen taught a broad spectrum of classes at AUR. These included areas such as: anthropology, history, sociology, and politics. Within the framework of International Political Anthropology he co-organises the annual International Political Anthropology Summer School in Florence. This course was designed for post-graduates that work in the cross-roads between anthropology and political affairs. His career includes over ten years of experience in teaching and student advising at institutions in Europe including the University of Copenhagen.

== See also ==
- Liminality
